= Busta Rhymes discography =

Discography of American rapper Busta Rhymes

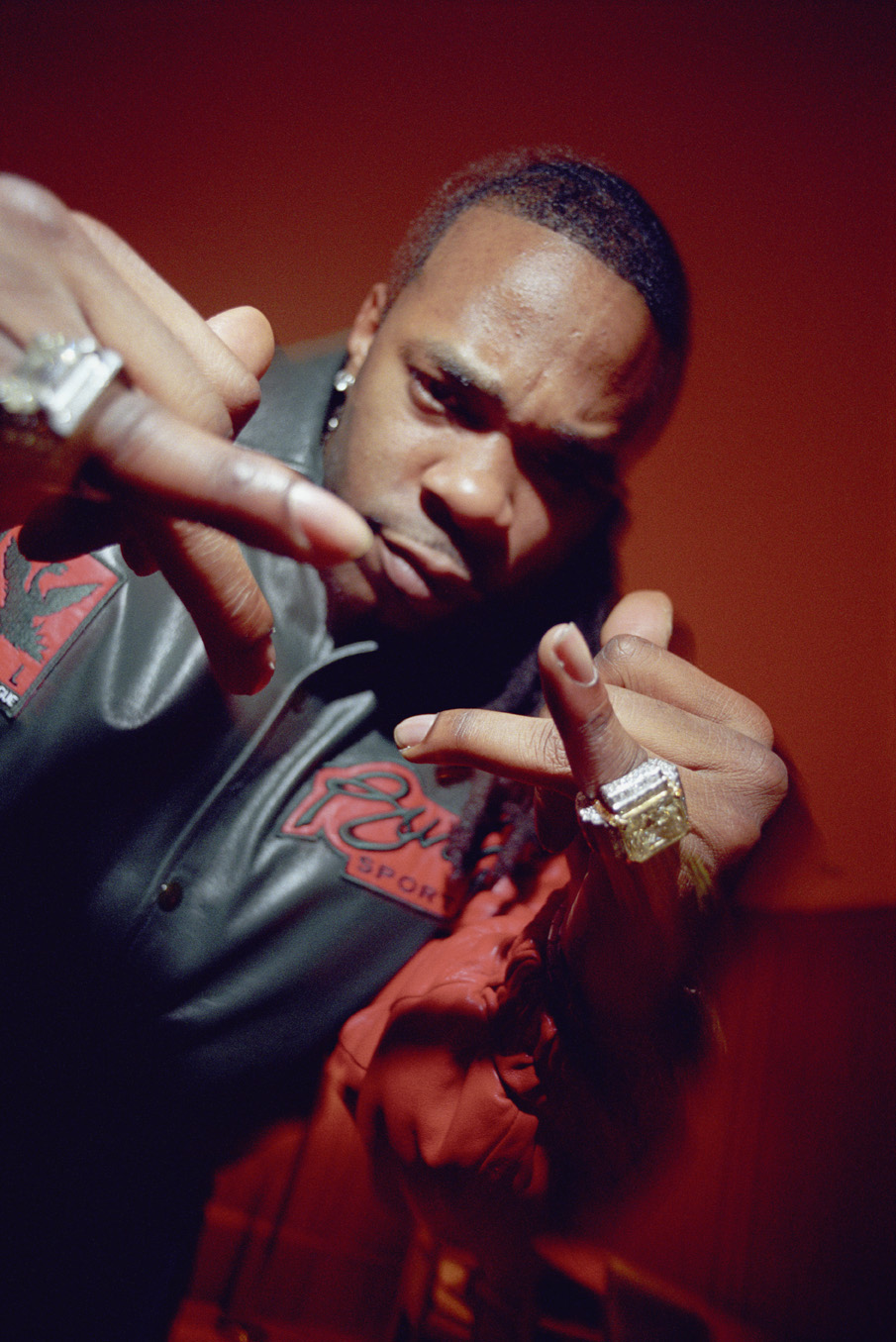
- Busta Rhymes in 2002
- Studio albums: 11
- Compilation albums: 3
- Singles: 93
- Music videos: 56
- Mixtapes: 7
- Promotional singles: 9

The discography of Busta Rhymes, an American rapper, consists of eleven studio albums, three compilation albums, eight mixtapes, 109 singles (including 57 as a featured artist), fifteen promotional singles, and 56 music videos. He signed his first recording contract with Elektra Records, at the age of just 17, after he has been contributing as a member of hip-hop group Leaders of the New School. Although the group would disband in 1994, him appearing a number of well-received guest appearances on songs by artists, including A Tribe Called Quest and Mary J. Blige, led to Elektra in offering him a solo contract in 1995. His debut studio album, The Coming (1996), from which features its lead single, "Woo Hah!! Got You All in Check", reached at number eight on the US Billboard Hot 100 and being certified gold by the Recording Industry Association of America (RIAA). As of 2019, he has sold around 9 million albums.

== Albums ==
=== Studio albums ===
List of studio albums, with selected chart positions, sales figures and certifications
Title	Album details	Peak chart positions										Sales figures	Certifications
Title	Album details	US	US R&B	AUS	CAN	FRA	GER	NLD	NZ	SWI	UK	Sales figures	Certifications
The Coming	Released: March 26, 1996; Label: Flipmode, Elektra; Format: CD, LP, cassette, digital download	6	1	—	9	—	80	—	—	—	48	US: 797,000 (Note: Sales figures as of March 7, 2014.)	RIAA: Platinum; MC: Gold
When Disaster Strikes...	Released: September 16, 1997; Label: Flipmode, Elektra; Format: CD, LP, cassette, digital download	3	1	—	21	—	62	73	—	—	34	US: 1,677,000	RIAA: Platinum; BPI: Gold
Extinction Level Event: The Final World Front	Released: December 15, 1998; Label: Flipmode, Elektra; Format: CD, LP, cassette, digital download	12	2	—	34	—	45	56	—	—	54	US: 1,648,000	RIAA: Platinum; BPI: Gold
Anarchy	Released: June 20, 2000; Label: Flipmode, Elektra; Format: CD, LP, cassette, digital download	4	1	—	26	54	63	87	50	65	38	US: 684,000	RIAA: Platinum
Genesis	Released: November 27, 2001; Label: Flipmode, J; Format: CD, LP, cassette, digital download	7	2	62	36	42	27	47	—	44	58	US: 1,339,000	RIAA: Platinum; BPI: Silver
It Ain't Safe No More...	Released: November 26, 2002; Label: Flipmode, J; Format: CD, LP, cassette, digital download	43	10	—	85	50	82	61	—	70	78	US: 678,000	RIAA: Gold; BPI: Silver
The Big Bang	Released: June 13, 2006; Label: Flipmode, Aftermath, Interscope; Format: CD, LP, digital download	1	1	42	6	18	10	27	11	6	19	US: 626,000	RIAA: Gold; BPI: Silver
Back on My B.S.	Released: May 19, 2009; Label: Flipmode, Universal Motown; Format: CD, DVD, LP, digital download	5	2	—	18	20	94	—	—	15	92	US: 156,000	
Year of the Dragon	Released: August 21, 2012; Label: The Conglomerate; Format: CD, Digital download	—	—	—	—	—	—	—	—	—	—		
Extinction Level Event 2: The Wrath of God	Released: October 30, 2020; Label: The Conglomerate, Empire; Format: CD, LP, digital download	7	4	—	26	144	—	—	—	—	99		
Blockbusta	Released: November 24, 2023; Label: The Conglomerate, Epic; Format: CD, LP, digital download	42	10	—	—	—	—	—	—	—	—		
"—" denotes a recording that did not chart or was not released in that territory.

=== Collaborative albums ===
List of collaborative albums, with selected chart positions
Title	Album details	Peak chart positions		
Title	Album details	US	US R&B	UK
A Future Without a Past... (as part of the Leaders of the New School)	Released: July 2, 1991; Label: Elektra; Format: CD, LP, cassette	128	53	—
T.I.M.E. (The Inner Mind's Eye) (as part of the Leaders of the New School)	Released: October 12, 1993; Label: Elektra; Format: CD, LP, cassette	66	15	—
The Imperial (as part of the Flipmode Squad)	Released: September 1, 1998; Label: Flipmode, Elektra; Format: CD, LP, cassette	15	3	85
Dillagence II (with J Dilla)	Released: August 25, 2026; Label: The Conglomerate; Format: Digital download, CD, LP	—	—	—
"—" denotes a recording that did not chart or was not released in that territory.

=== Compilation albums ===
List of compilation albums, with selected chart positions and certifications
Title	Album details	Peak chart positions			Certifications
Title	Album details	US R&B	US Rap	UK	Certifications
Total Devastation: The Best of Busta Rhymes	Released: October 2, 2001; Label: Flipmode, Elektra; Format: CD, LP, cassette, digital download	97	20	44	
Turn It Up! The Very Best of Busta Rhymes	Released: April 2, 2002; Label: Warner; Format: CD, LP, cassette, digital download	—	—	—	BPI: Silver
The Artist Collection: Busta Rhymes	Released: October 12, 2004; Label: BMG; Format: CD, LP, cassette, digital download	—	—	—	
"—" denotes a recording that did not chart or was not released in that territory.

== Extended plays ==
Title	EP details
The Fuse Is Lit	Released: November 18, 2022; Label: The Conglomerate, Empire; Format: Digital download
Dragon Season...The Awakening	Released: January 16, 2025; Label: The Conglomerate; Format: Digital download
Dragon Season... Equinox	Released: February 27, 2025; Label: The Conglomerate; Format: Digital download

== Mixtapes ==
Title	Mixtape details
Surrender (with DJ Whoo Kid)	Released: 2004; Label: Flipmode, Aftermath; Format: CD, digital download
The Crown (with DJ Drama)	Released: 2006; Label: Aphiliates, Flipmode, Aftermath; Format: CD, digital download
The Countdown to The Big Bang (with DJ Kay Slay)	Released: 2006; Label: Streetsweepers, Flipmode; Format: CD, digital download
Dillagence (with J Dilla)	Released: November 27, 2007; Label: Mick Boogie; Format: Digital download
I Bullshit You Not	Released: May 5, 2009; Label: Flipmode; Format: Digital download
Anarchy 2	Released: May 12, 2012; Label: The Conglomerate; Format: Digital download
Catastrophic (with Reek da Villian and J-Doe)	Released: December 21, 2012; Label: The Conglomerate; Format: Digital download
The Abstract and The Dragon (with Q-Tip)	Released: December 12, 2013; Label: The Conglomerate; Format: Digital download
Catastrophic 2 (with O.T. Genasis and J-Doe)	Released: August 7, 2014; Label: The Conglomerate; Format: Digital download
The Return of the Dragon (The Abstract Went on Vacation)	Released: December 25, 2015; Label: The Conglomerate; Format: Digital download

== Singles ==
=== As lead artist ===
List of singles as lead artist, with selected chart positions and certifications, showing year released and album name
Title	Year	Peak chart positions										Certifications	Album
Title	Year	US	US R&B	US Rap	AUS	GER	NLD	NZ	SWE	SWI	UK	Certifications	Album
"The Points" (with the Notorious B.I.G., Coolio, Redman, Ill Al Skratch, Big Mike, Buckshot and Bone Thugs-n-Harmony)	1995	—	80	—	—	—	—	—	—	—	—		Panther (soundtrack)
"Woo-Hah!! Got You All in Check" (solo or with Ol' Dirty Bastard)	1996	8	6	1	96	42	20	8	13	—	8	RIAA: Platinum	The Coming
"It's a Party" (featuring Zhané)	1996	52	27	7	—	—	34	—	—	—	23		The Coming
"Hit 'Em High (The Monstars' Anthem)" (with B-Real, Coolio, LL Cool J and Method Man)	1997	—	—	—	—	14	5	17	10	11	8		Space Jam (soundtrack)
"Do My Thing"	1997	—	—	—	—	—	—	—	—	—	39		The Coming
"Put Your Hands Where My Eyes Could See"	1997	— (Note: "Put Your Hands Where My Eyes Could See" did not enter the Billboard Hot 100, but peaked at number 37 on the Hot 100 Airplay chart.)	— (Note: "Put Your Hands Where My Eyes Could See" did not enter the Hot R&B/Hip-Hop Songs chart, but peaked at number two on the R&B/Hip-Hop Airplay chart.)	—	—	—	—	—	—	—	16		When Disaster Strikes...
"Dangerous"	1997	9	4	1	92	65	84	11	—	—	32	RIAA: Gold	When Disaster Strikes...
"Turn It Up (Remix) / Fire It Up"	1998	10	7	1	88	7	3	1	30	6	2	RIAA: Gold; BPI: Silver; RMNZ: Platinum	Can't Hardly Wait: Music From The Motion Picture / When Disaster Strikes...
"Everybody on the Line Outside" (as part of the Flipmode Squad)	1998	—	—	—	—	—	—	—	—	—	—		The Imperial
"One" (featuring Erykah Badu)	1998	—	—	—	—	—	—	17	—	—	23		When Disaster Strikes...
"Cha Cha Cha" (as part of the Flipmode Squad)	1998	—	—	—	—	—	—	—	—	—	—		The Imperial
"Gimme Some More"	1998	105 (Note: "Gimme Some More" did not enter the Billboard Hot 100, but peaked at number 17 on the Bubbling Under Hot 100 Singles chart.)	29	—	—	52	19	14	50	—	5	BPI: Silver	Extinction Level Event: The Final World Front
"Party Is Goin' on Over Here"	1998	—	72	—	—	—	—	—	—	—	—		Extinction Level Event: The Final World Front
"What's It Gonna Be?!" (featuring Janet Jackson)	1999	3	1	1	65	42	29	7	58	41	6	RIAA: Gold	Extinction Level Event: The Final World Front
"Get Out!!"	2000	118 (Note: "Get Out!!" did not enter the Billboard Hot 100, but peaked at number 18 on the Bubbling Under Hot 100 Singles chart.)	35	—	—	—	—	—	—	—	57		Anarchy
"Fire"	2000	—	67	24	—	—	—	—	—	—	60		Anarchy
"What It Is" (featuring Kelis)	2001	63	20	4	—	70	—	—	—	—	—		Violator: The Album, V2.0 / Genesis
"Break Ya Neck"	2001	26	10	9	13	17	27	—	—	20	11	ARIA: Gold; BPI: Silver; BVMI: Gold; RMNZ: Platinum	Genesis
"As I Come Back"	2001	—	91	7	—	—	—	—	—	—	—		Genesis
"Pass the Courvoisier, Part II" (featuring P. Diddy and Pharrell)	2002	11	4	3	43	27	47	—	—	58	16		Genesis
"Make It Clap" (featuring Spliff Star, or Sean Paul and Spliff Star)	2003	46	17	14	61	50	15	—	—	—	16		It Ain't Safe No More...
"I Know What You Want" (with Mariah Carey featuring The Flipmode Squad)	2003	3	2	3	3	9	4	7	11	5	3	RIAA: Platinum; ARIA: Platinum; BPI: Gold; RMNZ: 2× Platinum	It Ain't Safe No More...
"Light Your Ass on Fire" (featuring Pharrell)	2003	58	23	12	52	86	—	—	—	40	62		Clones
"Shorty (Put It on the Floor)" (with Fat Joe, Chingy and Nick Cannon)	2003	—	— (Note: "Shorty (Put It on the Floor)" did not enter the Hot R&B/Hip-Hop Songs chart, but peaked at number one on the Bubbling Under R&B/Hip-Hop Singles chart.)	—	—	—	—	—	—	—	—		Love Don't Cost a Thing (soundtrack)
"Where's Your Money" (featuring Ol' Dirty Bastard)	2005	—	65	—	—	—	—	—	—	—	—		Non-album single
"Touch It"	2006	16	3	2	14	24	34	1	—	23	6	RIAA: Gold; BPI: Silver; RMNZ: Gold	The Big Bang
"I Love My Bitch" (featuring Kelis and will.i.am)	2006	41	18	8	22	38	43	8	—	22	8		The Big Bang
"New York Shit" (featuring Swizz Beatz)	2006	—	77	—	—	—	—	—	—	—	—		The Big Bang
"In the Ghetto" (featuring Rick James)	2006	—	50	24	—	—	—	—	—	—	—		The Big Bang
"Don't Touch Me (Throw da Water on 'Em)"	2008	— (Note: "Don't Touch Me (Throw da Water on 'Em)" did not enter the Billboard Hot 100, but peaked at number 12 on the Bubbling Under Hot 100 Singles chart.)	83	—	—	—	—	—	—	—	—		Non-album singles
"We Made It" (featuring Linkin Park)	2008	65	—	—	13	11	—	37	24	17	10	BPI: Silver	Non-album singles
"Arab Money" (featuring Ron Browz)	2008	86	31	9	—	—	—	—	—	—	—		Back on My B.S.
"Hustler's Anthem '09" (featuring T-Pain)	2009	—	51	19	—	—	—	—	—	—	—		Back on My B.S.
"Respect My Conglomerate" (featuring Jadakiss and Lil Wayne)	2009	— (Note: "Respect My Conglomerate" did not enter the Billboard Hot 100, but peaked at number 22 on the Bubbling Under Hot 100 Singles chart.)	82	—	—	—	—	—	—	—	—		Back on My B.S.
"World Go Round" (featuring Estelle)	2009	—	—	—	—	—	—	—	—	—	66		Back on My B.S.
"Stop the Party (Iron Man)" (featuring Swizz Beatz)	2010	—	87	—	—	—	—	—	—	—	—		Anarchy 2
"Why Stop Now" (featuring Chris Brown)	2011	—	79	—	—	—	—	—	—	—	—		Anarchy 2
"King Tut" (featuring Reek da Villian and J-Doe)	2012	—	—	—	—	—	—	—	—	—	—		Year of the Dragon
"#TwerkIt" (solo or featuring Nicki Minaj)	2013	—	— (Note: "#TwerkIt" did not enter the Hot R&B/Hip-Hop Songs chart, but peaked at number four on the Bubbling Under R&B/Hip-Hop Singles chart.)	—	—	—	—	—	—	—	—		Non-album singles
"Thank You" (featuring Q-Tip, Kanye West and Lil Wayne)	2013	—	— (Note: "Thank You" did not enter the Hot R&B/Hip-Hop Songs chart, but peaked at number seven on the Bubbling Under R&B/Hip-Hop Singles chart.)	—	52	—	—	—	—	—	13	BPI: Silver	Non-album singles
"Calm Down" (featuring Eminem) (Note: "Calm Down" was included on Extinction Level Event 2: The Wrath of God: Reloaded.)	2014	94	29	16	—	—	—	—	—	—	63		Extinction Level Event 2: The Wrath of God
"Aaahhhh!!!" (featuring Swizz Beatz)	2016	—	—	—	—	—	—	—	—	—	—		Non-album singles
"Girlfriend" (featuring Vybz Kartel and Tory Lanez)	2017	—	—	—	—	—	—	—	—	—	—		Non-album singles
"Get It" (featuring Missy Elliott and Kelly Rowland)	2018	—	—	—	—	—	—	—	—	—	—		Non-album singles
"The Don & the Boss" (featuring Vybz Kartel)	2020	—	—	—	—	—	—	—	—	—	—		Extinction Level Event 2: The Wrath of God
"Yuuuu" (with Anderson .Paak)	2020	—	—	—	—	—	—	—	—	—	—		Extinction Level Event 2: The Wrath of God
"Where I Belong" (featuring Mariah Carey)	2021	—	—	—	—	—	—	—	—	—	—		Extinction Level Event 2: The Wrath of God
"Slap" (with Big Daddy Kane and Conway the Machine)	2022	—	—	—	—	—	—	—	—	—	—		The Fuse Is Lit
"Beach Ball" (featuring BIA)	2023	—	—	—	—	—	—	—	—	—	—		Blockbusta
"Luxury Life" (featuring Coi Leray)	2023	—	—	—	—	—	—	—	—	—	—		Blockbusta
"Do the Busabus Pt.2"	2024	—	—	—	—	—	—	—	—	—	—		Vengeance
"—" denotes a recording that did not chart or was not released in that territory.

=== As featured artist ===
List of singles as featured artist, with selected chart positions and certifications, showing year released and album name
Title	Year	Peak chart positions										Certifications	Album
Title	Year	US	US R&B	US Rap	AUS	GER	NLD	NZ	SWE	SWI	UK	Certifications	Album
"Nitty Gritty (Dog Spelled Backwards Mix)" (KMD featuring Brand Nubian and Busta Rhymes)	1991	—	—	—	—	—	—	—	—	—	—		Mr. Hood
"Oh My God" (A Tribe Called Quest featuring Busta Rhymes)	1994	—	69	15	—	—	—	—	—	—	81		Midnight Marauders
"Flava in Ya Ear (Remix)" (Craig Mack featuring the Notorious B.I.G., Rampage, LL Cool J and Busta Rhymes)	1994	—	—	—	—	—	—	—	—	—	—		Project Funk da World
"Come wit da Git Down (Buckwild Remix)" (Artifacts featuring Busta Rhymes)	1994	—	—	—	—	—	—	—	—	—	—		Between a Rock and a Hard Place
"Vibin' (The New Flava)" (Boyz II Men featuring Treach. Craig Mack, Busta Rhymes and Method Man)	1995	—	—	—	—	—	—	—	—	—	—		The Remix Collection
"You're the One ('Puff Daddy' Bad Boy Remix)" (SWV featuring Busta Rhymes, Mr. Cheeks & Jay-Z)	1996	—	—	—	—	—	—	—	—	—	—		New Beginning
"Change Like the Weather" (Bounty Killer featuring Junior Reid and Busta Rhymes)	1996	—	—	—	—	—	—	—	—	—	—		My Xperience
"Wild for da Night" (Rampage the Last Boy Scout featuring Busta Rhymes)	1996	—	—	—	—	—	—	—	—	—	—		Scout's Honor… by Way of Blood
"Rumble in the Jungle" (Fugees featuring A Tribe Called Quest, John Forté and Busta Rhymes)	1997	—	— (Note: "Rumble in the Jungle" did not enter the Hot R&B/Hip-Hop Songs chart, but peaked at number 71 on the R&B/Hip-Hop Airplay chart.)	—	—	85	—	13	36	—	3		When We Were Kings (soundtrack)
"The After Party (The Theme II)" (Tracey Lee featuring Busta Rhymes and Pirate)	1997	—	—	—	—	—	—	—	—	—	—		Many Facez
"Curious" (LSG featuring LL Cool J, Busta Rhymes and MC Lyte)	1998	—	—	—	—	70	—	—	—	—	23		Levert.Sweat.Gill
"Victory" (Puff Daddy featuring the Notorious B.I.G. and Busta Rhymes)	1998	19	13	2	—	67	—	19	—	—	—	RIAA: Gold	No Way Out
"Da Goodness" (Redman featuring Busta Rhymes)	1999	—	50	9	—	—	—	—	—	—	—		Doc's da Name 2000
"Everybody Come On" (DJ Skribble featuring Busta Rhymes, Rampage, Spliff Star, Consequence and Ed Lover)	1999	—	—	—	—	—	—	30	—	—	—		Traffic Jams
"Imperial" (Rah Digga featuring Busta Rhymes)	1999	—	59	16	—	—	—	—	—	—	—		Dirty Harriet
"Ante Up" (Remix) (M.O.P. featuring Busta Rhymes, Remy Ma and Teflon)	2001	—	—	—	—	21	33	—	—	15	7	BPI: Silver	Warriorz
"Tonight I'm Gonna Let Go" (Syleena Johnson featuring Busta Rhymes, Rampage, Sham and Spliff Star)	2002	—	53	—	—	—	—	—	—	—	—		Chapter 2: The Voice
"So Gone" (Remix) (Monica featuring Busta Rhymes)	2003	—	—	—	—	—	—	—	—	—	—		Non-album single
"Fire (Yes, Yes Y'all)" (Joe Budden featuring Busta Rhymes)	2003	—	48	—	—	—	—	—	—	—	—		Joe Budden
"Get By" (Remix) (Talib Kweli featuring Jay-Z, Mos Def, Kanye West and Busta Rhymes)	2003	—	—	—	—	—	—	—	—	—	—		Non-album single
"Get Low" (Remix) (Lil Jon & The East Side Boyz featuring Busta Rhymes, Elephant Man and Ying Yang Twins)	2003	—	—	—	23	11	—	28	—	44	—		Part II
"Keep Doin' It" (Violator featuring Mystikal, Dirtbag and Busta Rhymes)	2003	—	92	—	—	—	—	—	—	—	—		Violator 3 Album V3: The Good, the Bad & the Ugly
"What's Happenin'" (Method Man featuring Busta Rhymes)	2004	—	65	—	—	82	—	—	—	—	15		Tical 0: The Prequel
"Don't Cha" (The Pussycat Dolls featuring Busta Rhymes)	2005	2	8	—	1	1	2	1	5	1	1	RIAA: Platinum; ARIA: 2× Platinum; BPI: 2× Platinum; BVMI: 2× Platinum; IFPI SWE: Gold; IFPI SWI: Gold; RMNZ: Gold	PCD
"For the Nasty" (Q-Tip featuring Busta Rhymes)	2005	—	86	—	—	—	—	—	—	—	—		Non-album singles
"Wanna Love You Girl" (Remix) (Robin Thicke featuring Busta Rhymes and Pharrell)	2006	—	—	—	—	—	—	—	—	—	—		Non-album singles
"Hurt" (T.I. featuring Alfamega and Busta Rhymes)	2007	—	89	—	—	—	—	—	—	—	—		T.I. vs. T.I.P.
"I'm So Hood" (Remix) (DJ Khaled featuring Young Jeezy, Ludacris, Busta Rhymes, Big Boi, Lil Wayne, Fat Joe, Birdman and Rick Ross)	2007	—	—	—	—	—	—	—	—	—	—		We the Best
"Run the Show" (Kat DeLuna featuring Busta Rhymes)	2008	— (Note: "Run the Show" did not enter the Billboard Hot 100, but peaked at number 17 on the Bubbling Under Hot 100 Singles chart.)	—	—	—	73	26	—	18	29	41		9 Lives
"Feedback" (So So Def Remix) (Janet Jackson featuring Busta Rhymes, Ciara and Fabolous)	2008	—	—	—	—	—	—	—	—	—	—		Non-album single
"Peace Sign/Index Down" (Gym Class Heroes featuring Busta Rhymes)	2008	—	—	—	—	—	—	—	—	—	—		The Quilt
"Rotate" (Capone-N-Noreaga featuring Ron Browz and Busta Rhymes)	2009	—	— (Note: "Rotate" did not enter the Hot R&B/Hip-Hop Songs chart, but peaked at number 15 on the Bubbling Under R&B/Hip-Hop Singles chart.)	—	—	—	—	—	—	—	—		Channel 10
"Blockstars" (DJ Kay Slay featuring Plies, Ray J, Jim Jones and Busta Rhymes)	2009	—	—	—	—	—	—	—	—	—	—		More Than Just a DJ
"Love You" (Timati featuring Busta Rhymes and Mariya)	2009	—	—	—	—	—	—	—	—	—	—		The Boss and SWAGG
"Euphoria" (Rakim featuring Busta Rhymes, Cocoa Chanelle, Jadakiss and Styles P)	2010	—	—	—	—	—	—	—	—	—	—		The Seventh Seal
"All I Do Is Win" (Remix) (DJ Khaled featuring T-Pain, Diddy, Nicki Minaj, Rick Ross, Busta Rhymes, Fabolous, Jadakiss, Fat Joe and Swizz Beatz)	2010	—	—	—	—	—	—	—	—	—	—		Non-album single
"Look at Me Now" (Chris Brown featuring Busta Rhymes and Lil Wayne)	2011	6	1	1	46	—	—	37	—	—	44	RIAA: Diamond; ARIA: 2× Platinum; BPI: Gold; RMNZ: 2× Platinum	F.A.M.E.
"C'mon (Catch 'Em by Surprise)" (Tiësto vs. Diplo featuring Busta Rhymes)	2011	—	—	—	—	68	8	—	—	68	12	BPI: Silver	Non-album singles
"Far Away" (Remix) (Marsha Ambrosius featuring Busta Rhymes)	2011	—	—	—	—	—	—	—	—	—	—		Non-album singles
"Worldwide Choppers" (Tech N9ne featuring Busta Rhymes, Ceza, D-Loc, JL of B. Hood, Twista, Twisted Insane, U$O and Yelawolf)	2011	— (Note: "Worldwide Choppers" did not enter the Billboard Hot 100, but peaked at number four on the Bubbling Under Hot 100 Singles chart.)	—	—	—	—	—	—	—	—	—	RIAA: Platinum	All 6's and 7's
"Harsh" (Styles P featuring Rick Ross and Busta Rhymes)	2011	—	— (Note: "Harsh" did not enter the Hot R&B/Hip-Hop Songs chart, but peaked at number 18 on the Bubbling Under R&B/Hip-Hop Singles chart.)	—	—	—	—	—	—	—	—		Master of Ceremonies
"Strut" (I.C. Green featuring Busta Rhymes)	2011	—	—	—	—	—	—	—	—	—	—		Non-album single
"Turn't Up" (Lil Twist featuring Busta Rhymes)	2011	—	88	—	—	—	—	—	—	—	—		Don't Get It Twisted
"The Woman You Love" (Ashanti featuring Busta Rhymes)	2011	—	59	—	—	—	—	—	—	—	—		Non-album singles
"60 Second Assassins" (DJ Kay Slay featuring Busta Rhymes, Layzie Bone, Twista and Jaz-O)	2011	—	—	—	—	—	—	—	—	—	—		Non-album singles
"Lehhhgooo" (N.O.R.E. featuring Waka Flocka Flame, Busta Rhymes and Game)	2012	—	—	—	—	—	—	—	—	—	—		Crack on Steroids
"Pride N Joy" (Fat Joe featuring Kanye West, Miguel, Jadakiss, Mos Def, DJ Khaled, Roscoe Dash and Busta Rhymes)	2012	—	81	—	—	—	—	—	—	—	—		Non-album singles
"Take You There" (Jodie Connor featuring Busta Rhymes)	2012	—	—	—	—	—	—	—	—	—	—		Non-album singles
"I'm Drinking" / "Rum & Redbull" (Remix) (Beenie Man and Fambo featuring Busta Rhymes)	2013	—	—	—	—	—	—	—	—	—	—		Non-album singles
"Shabba" (Remix) (ASAP Ferg featuring Shabba Ranks, Busta Rhymes and Migos)	2013	—	—	—	—	—	—	—	—	—	—		Non-album singles
"Manners" (N.O.R.E. featuring Busta Rhymes)	2014	—	—	—	—	—	—	—	—	—	—		Non-album singles
"Touchdown" (Remix) (O.T. Genasis featuring Busta Rhymes and French Montana)	2014	—	—	—	—	—	—	—	—	—	—		Non-album singles
"Broad Daylight" (M.O.P. featuring Busta Rhymes)	2014	—	—	—	—	—	—	—	—	—	—		Street Certified
"Devil" (Cash Cash featuring Busta Rhymes, B.o.B and Neon Hitch)	2015	—	—	—	—	—	—	—	—	—	—		Blood, Sweat & 3 Years
"Pleasure or Pain" (Stephen Marley featuring Busta Rhymes and Konshens)	2016	—	—	—	—	—	—	—	—	—	—		Revelation Pt. 2 – The Fruit of Life
"You Should Know" (Rapsody featuring Busta Rhymes)	2017	—	—	—	—	—	—	—	—	—	—		Laila's Wisdom
"I Got You" (Trippie Redd featuring Busta Rhymes)	2020	—	—	—	—	—	—	—	—	—	—		Pegasus
"Can't Put It in the Hands of Fate" (Stevie Wonder featuring Rapsody, Cordae, Chika and Busta Rhymes)	2020	—	—	—	—	—	—	—	—	—	—		Non-album single
"Nutshell Pt. 2" (Phife Dawg featuring Busta Rhymes and Redman)	2021	—	—	—	—	—	—	—	—	—	—		Forever
"ETA" (Dr. Dre featuring Snoop Dogg, Anderson .Paak and Busta Rhymes)	2022	—	—	—	—	—	—	—	—	—	—		The Contract EP
"Native Sons Pt. 2" (Talib Kweli & J. Rawls featuring Busta Rhymes, Black Thought, Posdnuos, Maseo, Mike G, Afrika)	2025												Notes from the Underground
"—" denotes a recording that did not chart or was not released in that territory.

=== Promotional singles ===
List of promotional singles, with selected chart positions, showing year released and album name
Title	Year	Peak chart positions		Album
Title	Year	US Bub.	US R&B	Album
"One Two Shit" (A Tribe Called Quest featuring Busta Rhymes)	1994	—	—	Non-album promotional single
"Abandon Ship" (featuring Rampage The Last Boy Scout)	1996	—	—	The Coming
"Everything Remains Raw"	1996	—	—	The Coming
"Ill Vibe" (featuring Q-Tip)	1996	—	—	The Coming
"Far Away" (with Hurricane G)	1996	—	—	Non-album promotional single
"Live to Regret"	1996	—	—	Set It Off: Music From the New Line Cinema Motion Picture
"You Won't Tell, I Won't Tell" (featuring Greg Nice)	1997	—	—	Non-album promotional singles
"Coming Off"	1997	—	—	Non-album promotional singles
"Rhymes Galore"	1998	—	—	When Disaster Strikes...
"There's No Problem My Squad Can't Fix" (featuring Jamal)	1998	—	—	When Disaster Strikes...
"Tear da Roof Off"	1998	—	75	Extinction Level Event: The Final World Front
"Do It Like Never Before"	1998	—	—	Non-album promotional single
"Do the Bus a Bus"	1998	24	43	Extinction Level Event: The Final World Front
"Grinch 2000" (with Jim Carrey)	2000	—	—	Dr. Seuss' How the Grinch Stole Christmas (soundtrack)
"Fallin' (Remix)" (Alicia Keys featuring Busta Rhymes and Rampage)	2001	—	—	Songs in A Minor
"We Goin' to Do It to Ya"	2002	19	—	It Ain't Safe No More...
"Gimme the Light" (Pass the Dro-Voisier Remix) (Sean Paul featuring Busta Rhymes)	2002	—	—	Dutty Rock
"Don't Get Carried Away" (featuring Nas)	2006	—	—	The Big Bang
"They're Out to Get Me" (featuring Mr. Porter)	2006	—	—	The Big Bang
"East Coast" (Remix) (ASAP Ferg featuring Busta Rhymes, ASAP Rocky, Dave East, French Montana, Rick Ross and Snoop Dogg)	2017	—	—	Still Striving
"Taking Everything"	2025	—	—	The Bad Guys 2 (Original Motion Picture Soundtrack)

== Other charted songs ==
List of other charted songs, with selected chart positions, showing year released and album name
Title	Year	Peak chart positions				Certifications	Album
Title	Year	US	US R&B	US Rap	CAN	Certifications	Album
"Pass the Courvoisier" (featuring P. Diddy)	2001	—	— (Note: "Pass the Courvoisier" did not enter the Hot R&B/Hip-Hop Songs chart, but peaked at number 25 on the Bubbling Under R&B/Hip-Hop Singles chart.)	—	—		Genesis
"Hail Mary" (with Eminem and 50 Cent)	2003	— (Note: "Hail Mary" did not enter the Billboard Hot 100, but peaked at number 11 on the Bubbling Under Hot 100 Singles chart.)	33	18	—		Invasion Part II: Conspiracy Theory
"Victory 2004" (with P. Diddy, The Notorious B.I.G., 50 Cent and Lloyd Banks)	2004	—	61	—	—		Bad Boy's 10th Anniversary... The Hits
"I'll Hurt You" (featuring Eminem)	2005	—	— (Note: "I'll Hurt You" did not enter the Hot R&B/Hip-Hop Songs chart, but peaked at number two on the Bubbling Under R&B/Hip-Hop Singles chart.)	—	—		Non-album song
"La La" (Lil Wayne featuring Brisco and Busta Rhymes)	2008	—	— (Note: "La La" did not enter the Hot R&B/Hip-Hop Songs chart, but peaked at number six on the Bubbling Under R&B/Hip-Hop Singles chart.)	—	—		Tha Carter III
"Decision" (featuring Jamie Foxx, Mary J. Blige, John Legend and Common)	2009	—	— (Note: "Decision" did not enter the Hot R&B/Hip-Hop Songs chart, but peaked at number ten on the Bubbling Under R&B/Hip-Hop Singles chart.)	—	—		Back on My B.S.
"Let's Go" (Travis Barker featuring Yelawolf, Twista, Busta Rhymes and Lil Jon)	2011	— (Note: "Let's Go" did not enter the Billboard Hot 100, but peaked at number 19 on the Bubbling Under Hot 100 Singles chart.)	—	—	—		Give the Drummer Some
"Outro" (Lil Wayne featuring Bun B, Nas, Shyne and Busta Rhymes)	2011	— (Note: "Outro" did not enter the Billboard Hot 100, but peaked at number three on the Bubbling Under Hot 100 Singles chart.)	—	—	—		Tha Carter IV
"Drummer Boy" (Justin Bieber featuring Busta Rhymes)	2011	99	—	—	86	RIAA: Gold	Under the Mistletoe
"My Shot (Rise Up Remix)" (The Roots featuring Busta Rhymes, Joell Ortiz and Nate Ruess)	2016	—	— (Note: "My Shot (Rise Up Remix)" did not enter the US Hot R&B/Hip-Hop Songs Chart but peaked at number 16 on the R&B/Hip-Hop Digital Song Sales chart.)	— (Note: "My Shot (Rise Up Remix)" did not enter the US Hot Rap Songs chart but peaked at number 14 on the Rap Digital Song Sales chart.)	—		The Hamilton Mixtape
"—" denotes a recording that did not chart or was not released in that territory.

== Discography with Flipmode Squad ==
Albums:

The Imperial (1998, Elektra)

Mixtapes:

The Facelift (2007)

Singles:

"Cha Cha Cha" (1998)
"Everybody on the Line Outside" / "Run for Cover" (1998)
"Here We Go" (2002)
"Just Chill" (2002)
"Ain't Nothin' to Fuck With" (2003)

== Guest appearances ==
List of non-single guest appearances, with other performing artists, showing year released and album name
Title	Year	Other artist(s)	Album
"Come on Down"	1991	Big Daddy Kane, Q-Tip	Prince of Darkness
"Intro Talk"	1992	Mary J. Blige	What's the 411?
"A Buncha Niggas"	1992	Heavy D & the Boyz, 3rd Eye, The Notorious B.I.G., Rob-O	Blue Funk
"Wicked Act"	1993	Buju Banton	Voice of Jamaica
"Keep Steppin' On"	1993	Another Bad Creation	It Ain't What U Wear, It's How U Play It
"Alladat"	1994	Brand Nubian	Everything Is Everything
"Can I Get a Witness (Interlude)"	1994	TLC	CrazySexyCool
"Do You Want It"	1994	Rampage the Last Boyscout	Red Oktoba
"Representin' Uniondale"	1995	Doo Wop	'95 Live: The Classic Collection
"Build Ya Skillz"	1995	KRS-One	KRS-One
"Freestyle"	1995	Funkmaster Flex, Rampage	The Mix Tape, Vol. 1
"Flashlight (Groovemaster's Remix)"	1996	George Clinton, Q-Tip, Ol' Dirty Bastard	Greatest Funkin' Hits
"Psychologically Overcast"	1996	Fishbone	Chim Chim's Badass Revenge
"Milk"	1996	Young Zee, KRS-One	Musical Meltdown
"Yeah"	1996	Keith Murray, Jamal, Redman, Erick Sermon	Enigma
"Wild Hot"	1997	A Tribe Called Quest	Rhyme & Reason soundtrack
"Pay Ya Dues"	1997	Frankie Cutlass, Keith Murray, Cocoa Brovaz	Politics & Bullshit
"Driver's Seat"	1997	Capone-N-Noreaga, Imam T.H.U.G.	The War Report
"Busta's Intro"	1997	None	Supa Dupa Fly
"Busta's Outro"	1997	None	Supa Dupa Fly
"Flipmode Iz da Squad"	1997	Rampage	Scout's Honor… by Way of Blood
"Get Money and Dip"	1997	Rampage	Scout's Honor… by Way of Blood
"Intro"	1997	Nice & Smooth	IV: Blazing Hot
"Intro"	1997	Diamond D, Kid Capri	Hatred, Passions and Infidelity
"This One"	1997	Diamond D	Hatred, Passions and Infidelity
"Starsky & Hutch"	1997	LL Cool J	Phenomenon
"I'll Be Right There"	1997	Jagged Edge	A Jagged Era
"Niggaz Wanna Act"	1997	Mase	Harlem World
"Loco Como Rodman"	1997	Boricua Guerrero, Jahvia	First Combat
"Parental Discretion"	1998	Big Pun	Capital Punishment
"Get Money"	1998	8Ball	Lost
"The Assignment"	1998	Noreaga, Spliff Star, Maze	N.O.R.E.
"Whacha Want Whacha Need"	1998	Mystikal	Ghetto Fabulous
"Do It to Me"	1998	E-40	The Element of Surprise
"Freestyle"	1998	Funkmaster Flex, Flipmode Squad	The Mix Tape, Vol. III
"Get Contact"	1998	Missy Elliott	Why Do Fools Fall in Love soundtrack
"Steppin' It Up"	1998	A Tribe Called Quest, Redman	The Love Movement
"Let's Dance"	1998	Brand Nubian	Foundation
"On Your Marks, Get Set, Ready, Go!"	1998	None	The Rugrats Movie soundtrack
"The Hit-Off"	1998	Kid Capri, Spliff Star	Soundtrack to the Streets
"The Onslaught"	1999	Black Moon	War Zone
"More Dangerous"	1999	Lil' Cease, G. Dep, Mr. Bristal	The Wonderful World of Cease A Leo
"Rap Is Still Outta Control"	1999	EPMD	Out of Business
"What My Niggaz Want"	1999	Cam'ron	Violator: The Album
"Bus-A-Bus" (Remix)	1999	None	Violator: The Album
"Violators"	1999	L Boogie, Sonya Blade, Noreaga, Mysonne, Prodigy	Violator: The Album
"Reverse"	1999	Puff Daddy, G. Dep, Sauce Money, Shyne, Redman, Cee Lo Green	Forever
"Do It Now"	1999	Mos Def	Black on Both Sides
"The Next Shit"	1999	Pharoahe Monch	Internal Affairs
"Simon Says" (Remix)	1999	Pharoahe Monch, Lady Luck, Redman, Method Man, Shabaam Sahdeeq	Internal Affairs
"Rastaman Chant"	1999	Bob Marley, Flipmode Squad	Chant Down Babylon
"N.T."	1999	Q-Tip	Amplified
"Dangerous MC's"	1999	The Notorious B.I.G., Mark Curry, Snoop Dogg	Born Again
"Bongo Break"	2000	The Madd Rapper	Tell 'Em Why U Madd
"Holla Holla" (Remix)	2000	Ja Rule, Jay-Z, Vita, Black Child, Tah Murdah, Memphis Bleek	Irv Gotti Presents: The Murderers
"What It's All About"	2000	Slum Village	Fantastic, Vol. 2
"Fright Night"	2000	Ruff Ryders, Swizz Beatz	Ryde or Die Vol. 2
"I.C. Y'all"	2000	De La Soul	Art Official Intelligence: Mosaic Thump
"Things"	2000	Keith Sweat, Rah Digga	Didn't See Me Coming
"The Monument"	2000	Wu-Tang Clan	The W
"Getting It"	2001	DJ Clue?, Rah Digga	The Professional 2
"Gutter 2 The Fancy Ish"	2001	Angie Martinez	Up Close and Personal
"Bus-a-Bus Interlude"	2001	None	Miss E... So Addictive
"What It Is, Pt. 2"	2001	Flipmode Squad, Kelis	Dr. Dolittle 2 soundtrack
"Bully Foot"	2001	Tha Alkaholiks	X.O. Experience
"Holla"	2001	—N/a	The Wash (soundtrack)/Genesis
"When Bus Callz (Insert)"	2001	Bad Azz	Personal Business
"Last Night a D.J. Saved My Life"	2001	Mariah Carey, Fabolous, DJ Clue?, De La Soul	Glitter soundtrack
"We Thuggin'" (Remix)	2001	Fat Joe, Noreaga, R. Kelly, Remy Ma	Jealous Ones Still Envy (J.O.S.E.)
"The One"	2002	Silkk the Shocker, Dub Pistols	Blade II: The Soundtrack
"Pussycat (Remix)"	2002	Wyclef Jean, Loon, City High	Non-album single
"Bad Boy for Life" (Remix)	2002	P. Diddy, M.O.P.	We Invented the Remix
"Freaks Come Out at Night"	2002	Uncle Kracker	Scooby-Doo soundtrack
"Figadoh" (Remix)	2002	Benzino, M.O.P.	The Benzino Remix Project
"Holla Back Slime"	2002	N.O.R.E., Jadakiss	God's Favorite
"On"	2002	Large Professor	1st Class
"Endalay"	2002	Swizz Beatz	Swizz Beatz Presents G.H.E.T.T.O. Stories
"Throw Your Shit Up"	2003	DJ Envy, Rah Digga	The Desert Storm Mixtape: Blok Party, Vol. 1
"Hail Mary"	2003	Eminem, 50 Cent	Invasion Part II: Conspiracy Theory
"Lovely Day"	2003	Luther Vandross	Dance with My Father
"Never Leave You (Uh Oooh, Uh Oooh)" (Remix)	2003	Lumidee, Fabolous	Almost Famous
"Never Scared (Takeover Remix)"	2003	Bone Crusher, Jadakiss, Cam'Ron	Non-album single
"On Smash"	2003	Keith Murray, Kell-Vicious	He's Keith Murray
"Oh!"	2003	Obie Trice	Cheers
"Forget About It Bout It"	2003	Lordz of Brooklyn	Grafitti Roc
"Like a Pimp (Remix)"	2003	David Banner, Twista	MTA2: Baptized in Dirty Water
"Revolution"	2003	2Pac	Rap Phenomenon II
"Gunz on My Side"	2003	2Pac, Lil Jon, E.D.I. Mean	Rap Phenomenon II
"R U Ready 4 This"	2004	Pitch Black	Pitch Black Law
"Victory 2004"	2004	P. Diddy, The Notorious B.I.G., 50 Cent, Lloyd Banks	Bad Boy's 10th Anniversary... The Hits
"Throw an Elbow"	2004	DJ Muggs, Chace Infinite, Sixx John	Last Assassin
"Suicide Bounce"	2004	Nas	Street's Disciple
"Tough Guy"	2004	Xzibit	Weapons of Mass Destruction
"Like Father, Like Son"	2005	The Game	The Documentary
"Wait (Remix)"	2005	Ying Yang Twins, Free, Lil Scrappy, Missy Elliott	U.S.A.
"Whatchalike"	2005	Kardinal Offishall	Fire and Glory
"Geek Down"	2006	J Dilla	The Shining
"March"	2006	Hi-Tek	Hi-Teknology²: The Chip
"Music for Life"	2006	Hi-Tek	Hi-Teknology²: The Chip
"Doctor's Advocate"	2006	The Game	Doctor's Advocate
"Come Thru"	2006	DMX	Year of the Dog... Again
"In the Ghetto" (Remix)	2006	Ludacris, Rick James	Pre-Release Therapy
"Passing the Torch..."	2006	Willie the Kid	Divide and Conquer
"Walk Witt Me"	2007	Freeway, Jadakiss	Free at Last
"Running Your Mouth"	2007	The Notorious B.I.G., Fabolous, Snoop Dogg	Greatest Hits
"Uh Huh"	2007	Free	None
"Let It Go" (Remix)	2007	Keyshia Cole, Missy Elliott, Lil' Kim	None
"Crying Out for Me" (Remix)	2007	Mario, Lil Wayne	None
"Where's My Money"	2007	None	Grand Theft Auto IV
"Can't Tell Me Nothing" (Remix)	2007	Kanye West, Lil Wayne, Young Jeezy	None
"Set It Off" (Remix)	2007	N.O.R.E., Swizz Beatz, Red Café, Cassidy, Talib Kweli	None
"Shine"	2008	Focus..., Bishop Lamont	Dedicated
"Speedin'" (We the Best Remix)	2008	Rick Ross, R. Kelly, DJ Khaled, Plies, Birdman, DJ Drama, Webbie, Gorilla Zoe, Fat Joe, Torch, Gunplay, DJ Bigga Rankin', Flo Rida, Brisco, Lil Wayne	The Flo Rida Cash Cartel
"Music for Love" (Remix)	2008	Mario	
"The Way We Roll" (Remix)	2008	Elephant Man, Shaggy	Let's Get Physical
"La La"	2008	Lil Wayne, Brisco	Tha Carter III
"Head Banger"	2008	Alfamega	Street Runnaz
"Fried Chicken"	2008	Nas	Untitled
"She's like a Star" (Remix)	2008	Taio Cruz, Sugababes	None
"Side Effects" (Remix)	2008	Mariah Carey	None
"Let's Ride" (Remix)	2008	Josh-Z-Antus, Red Cafe, Jadakiss	None
"She's Fine"	2008	DJ Khaled, Sean Paul, Missy Elliott	We Global
"Kissin' the Curb"	2008	Jake One, Bishop Lamont	White Van Music
"Black President" (Remix Part 1)	2008	DJ Green Lantern, David Banner, Talib Kweli	Yes We Can: The Mixtape
"Turnin Me On" (Remix)	2008	Keri Hilson	None
"Dat Shit"	2008	Marsha Ambrosius	Yours Truly
"How to Be a Boss"	2009	Jim Jones, Ludacris, NOE	Pray IV Reign
"G-Stro"	2009	None	Fast & Furious soundtrack
"Lion's Roar"	2009	Asher Roth, New Kingdom	Asleep in the Bread Aisle
"We Must Be Heard"	2009	DJ Drama, Ludacris, Willie the Kid	Gangsta Grillz: The Album (Vol. 2)
"Billionaire"	2009	Twista	Category F5
"Director's Cut"	2009	Uncle Murda	Summer Time Shootouts
"About Me"	2009	Raekwon	Only Built 4 Cuban Linx... Pt. II
"Dinner Time"	2009	Royce da 5'9"	Street Hop
"Intro"	2010	DJ Kay Slay	More Than Just a DJ
"Blockstars" (Remix)	2010	DJ Kay Slay, Sheek Louch, Rick Ross, Papoose, Cam'ron, Vado, Ray J	More Than Just a DJ
"I'll Kill"	2010	Ace Mac	None
"Lowrider"	2010	Game	The Red Room
"The Oath"	2010	Capone-n-Noreaga, Raekwon	The War Report 2: Report the War
“Superstar”	2010	Ghostface Killah	Apollo Kids
"Intro"	2010	DJ Khaled, Diddy	Victory
"Killing Me"	2010	DJ Khaled, Buju Banton, Bounty Killer	Victory
"Brake Lights"	2010	Game	Brake Lights
"Cold Blood"	2010	Game, Dre	Brake Lights
"At Last, Supremecy"	2010	Fat Joe	The Darkside Vol. 1
"Crane Style"	2011	Raekwon	Shaolin vs. Wu-Tang
"H•A•M" (Remix)	2011	None	None
"Let the Dogs Loose"	2011	Papoose, Raekwon, Sheek Louch, Styles P	The 2nd Coming
"Let's Go"	2011	Travis Barker, Yelawolf, Twista, Lil Jon	Give the Drummer Some
"Coke, Dope, Crack, Smack"	2011	J-Doe	None
"Take It to the Hole"	2011	LMFAO	Sorry for Party Rocking
"Sleep When I'm Gone"	2011	DJ Khaled, Cee Lo Green, Game	We the Best Forever
"Welcome to My Hood" (Remix)	2011	DJ Khaled, Ludacris, T-Pain, Mavado, Twista, Birdman, Ace Hood, Fat Joe, Jadakiss, Bun B, Game, Waka Flocka Flame	We the Best Forever
"Go n Get It" (Remix)	2011	Ace Hood, Beanie Sigel, Pusha T, Styles P	Blood, Sweat & Tears
"Fall Out" (Remix)	2011	Reek da Villain, Roscoe Dash, Ace Hood, Akon, Bun B	None
"Coke, Dope, Crack, Smack" (Remix)	2011	J-Doe, David Banner, T-Pain	None
"Outro"	2011	Bun B, Nas, Shyne	Tha Carter IV
"Drummer Boy"	2011	Justin Bieber	Under the Mistletoe
"Grow Up"	2011	Cher Lloyd	Sticks and Stones
"Next Level"	2011	Mary J. Blige	My Life II... The Journey Continues (Act 1)
"Rigamortis" (Remix)	2011	Kendrick Lamar	None
"Wrestler"	2011	OJ da Juiceman	The Lord of the Rings
"Shit Done Got Real"	2011	Ace Hood, Yelawolf	The Statement 2
"The Money"	2011	DJ Pharris, R. Kelly, Fabolous, Fat Joe	None
"MTV Cribs"	2012	Raekwon	Unexpected Victory
"Straight from the Golden"	2012	Large Professor	Professor @ Large
"Bottles & Rockin' J's"	2012	Game, DJ Khaled, Rick Ross, Fabolous, Lil Wayne, Teyana Taylor	California Republic
"Got Damn" (Remix)	2012	DJ Kay Slay, Torch, Gunplay, French Montana, 2 Chainz	None
"Earthquake" (All-Stars Remix)	2012	Labrinth, Tinie Tempah, Kano, Wretch 32	Electronic Earth
"Different Cloth"	2012	Wiz Khalifa	None
"Coffin"	2012	Slaughterhouse	Welcome to: Our House
"Mobbin" (Remix)	2012	Maino, Jim Jones, Gucci Mane, Yo Gotti, Trae Tha Truth	The Mafia
"Nowhere"	2012	Tank	This Is How I Feel
"I Can't Take It" (Remix)	2012	DJ Paul, DJ Kay Slay	None
"Play Dirty"	2012	Termanology, Lil' Fame, Styles P	Fizzyology
"Violent Music"	2012	DJ Kay Slay, DJ Paul, Vado	Grown Man Hip-Hop
"You Wonder"	2013	Future, Rocko	F.B.G.: The Movie
"They My Juniors"	2013	Consequence	Movies on Demand 4
"Come and Get It"	2013	T-Pain, Ace Hood	None
"Violent Music" (Remix)	2013	DJ Kay Slay, DJ Paul, Bun B, Vado, Gunplay	Grown Man Hip Hop Part 2 (Sleepin' With The Enemy)
"Self Made"	2013	Bow Wow, Tyga	Greenlight 5
"Grave Digga"	2013	Gudda Gudda, Mr. Blac	REDRUM
"Faces of Death"	2013	N.O.R.E., French Montana, Swizz Beatz, Raekwon	Student of the Game
"Shake It"	2013	Funkmaster Flex, Future, Trey Songz	Who You Mad At? Me or Yourself?
"Remedy"	2013	Snoop Lion, Chris Brown	Reincarnated
"Rocket Ships"	2013	Talib Kweli	Prisoner of Conscious
"Never Get Over You"	2013	PJ Morton	New Orleans
"Kobe or Ginobili" (Remix)	2013	Mack Maine, Rick Ross, French Montana, Ace Hood	None
"Hold That"	2013	Tony Touch, J-Doe, Reek da Villain, Roc Marciano	The Piece Maker 3: Return of the 50 MC's
"Kan't See Me"	2013	Cory Gunz	Datz WTF I'm Talkin Bout
"Everyday"	2013	Cory Gunz, Birdman, Mystikal	Rich Gang
"Break of Dawn"	2013	Jay Sean	Neon
"Sweet Caroline"	2013	Chris Brown	X Files
"How We Survive"	2013	Sean Kingston	Back 2 Life
"Partition" (Remix)	2014	Beyoncé, Azealia Banks	None
"Hot Nigga" (Remix)	2014	Bobby Shmurda, Fabolous, Jadakiss, Chris Brown, Rowdy Rebel, Yo Gotti	None
"All Over"	2014	Onyx	#Turndafucup
"The Capn"	2014	WatchtheDuck	Don't Watch Me
"Wall to Wall"	2015	Raekwon, French Montana	Fly International Luxurious Art
"Beast" (Southpaw Remix)	2015	Rob Bailey & The Hustle Standard, KXNG Crooked, Tech N9ne	Southpaw: Original Motion Picture Soundtrack
"Fly on the Wall"	2015	Jay Rock, Macy Gray	90059
"Out the Trunk (Remix)"	2015	Fashawn	None
"Like Father, Like Son 2"	2015	The Game	The Documentary 2.5
"Final Hour"	2016	Hodgy	Fireplace: TheNotTheOtherSide
"Don't Ever Play Yourself"	2016	DJ Khaled, Jadakiss, Fabolous, Fat Joe, Kent Jones	Major Key
"Solid Wall of Sound"	2016	A Tribe Called Quest, Jack White, Elton John	We Got It from Here... Thank You 4 Your Service
"Dis Generation"	2016	A Tribe Called Quest	We Got It from Here... Thank You 4 Your Service
"Mobius"	2016	A Tribe Called Quest, Consequence	We Got It from Here... Thank You 4 Your Service
"The Donald"	2016	A Tribe Called Quest, Katia Cadet	We Got It from Here... Thank You 4 Your Service
"My Shot" (Rise Up Remix)	2016	The Roots, Joell Ortiz, Nate Ruess	The Hamilton Mixtape
"Somebody Knows"	2017	The Notorious B.I.G., Faith Evans	The King & I
"Hear My Cry"	2017	AD	Blue 89 C2
"Ça va trop vite"	2017	Bigflo & Oli	La vraie vie
"Brossface Bripper"	2018	Westside Gunn, Benny The Butcher	Supreme Blientele
"Bubblin' (Remix)"	2018	Anderson .Paak	Non-album single
"Jumpin"	2018	9th Wonder	Jamla is the Squad II
"Like Dis (Remix)"	2018	Phresher	—N/a
"Ocean Prime"	2020	Westside Gunn, Slick Rick	Who Made the Sunshine
"It's About to Go Down"	2020	DJ Kay Slay, Ghostface KIllah	Homage
"Don't Give Up"	2020	Sam I, Sia, Vic Mensa	Random Shit from the Internet Era
"Major Distribution"	2020	Flee Lord	In the Name of Prodigy
"No Peace"	2020	Salaam Remi, Black Thought, Mumu Fresh, Doug E. Fresh	Black on Purpose
"Line Em Up"	2020	Russ	Chomp
"Quiet One"	2021	Diamond D & Talib Kweli	Gotham
"murder Music"	2021	Snoop Dogg, Jadakiss, Benny the Butcher	The Algorithm
"Negro Spiritual"	2021	Khrysis, Pharoahe Monch	The Hour of Khrysis
"Harder"	2022	Lion Babe	Harder
"Science Class"	2022	Westside Gunn, Raekwon, Ghostface KIllah, Stove God Cooks	10
"Ready or Not"	2022	Calvin Harris	Funk Wav Bounces Vol. 2
"Right to Left"	2022	Diplo, Mele	Diplo
"Boing Boing Remix"	2022	Nems, Styles P, Fat Joe	Bong Kong Ep
"Lost Souls"	2022	Meechy Darko, Denzel Curry	Gothic Luxury
"Goodnight"	2023	Ron Browz	One Twenty Seven
"Big One"	2023	Tyga, YG	Hit Me When U Leave the Klub: The Playlist
"Billie Eilish Remix"	2023	Armani White, Ludacris, N.O.R.E.,	Non-album single
"Murder"	2023	Bilal	Godfather of Harlem (season 3)
"Deliver Me"	2023	Diddy, Dawn Richard, Kalenna	The Love Album: Off the Grid
"Oh Boy"	2023	Chris Webby	Last Wednesday
"Shots"	2024	Ghostface KIllah, Serani	Set the Tone (Guns & Roses)
"Huey"	2024	LL Cool J	The FORCE
"Jesus Arms"	2024	Benny the Butcher & .38 Speech	Stabbed and Shot 2
"Ego Maniacs"	2024	Ice Cube, Killer Mike	Man Down
"Wassup"	2024	Ciara	Non-album single
"Survive the Night"	2024	Lin-Manuel Miranda, Elsa Davis, RZA, Nas, Cam'Ron, Ghostface Killah	Warriors
"Cerebro"	2024	Residente	Las Letras Ya No Importan
Round	2025	Spice	Non-album single
"Long Live J Dilla"	2025	Karriem Riggins, Westside Gunn	—N/a
"Make a Livin' (Remix)"	2025	MC Lyte, Lady London	Non-album single
"The Moment"	2025	Xzibit, Jason Martin	Kingmaker
"You're Mine"	2025	Bun B, Statik Selektah	Trillstatik 5

== Music videos ==
=== As lead artist ===
List of music videos as lead artist, with directors, showing year released
Title	Year	Director(s)
"Woo Hah!! Got You All in Check"	1996	Hype Williams
"It's a Party" (featuring Zhané)	1996	Marcus Raboy
"Woo Hah!! Got You All in Checker (Remix)" (featuring Ol' Dirty Bastard)	1996	
"Hit 'Em High (The Monstars' Anthem)" (with B-Real, Coolio, LL Cool J and Method Man)	1996	Hype Williams
"Put Your Hands Where My Eyes Could See"	1997	Hype Williams
"Dangerous"	1997	Hype Williams
"Turn It Up" (Remix) / "Fire It Up"	1998	Paul Hunter
"Gimme Some More"	1998	Hype Williams
"Tear da Roof Off" / "Party Going on Over Here"	1999	Hype Williams
"What's It Gonna Be?!" (featuring Janet Jackson)	1999	Hype Williams
"Get Out!!"	2000	Hype Williams
"Fire"	2000	Hype Williams
"What It Is" (featuring Kelis)	2001	Hype Williams
"Break Ya Neck"	2001	Hype Williams
"Pass the Courvoisier, Part II" (featuring Diddy and Pharrell)	2002	Chris Robinson
"Make It Clap" (featuring Spliff Star)	2002	Chris Robinson
"Make It Clap" (V2) (featuring Sean Paul and Spliff Star)	2002	Erik White
"I Know What You Want" (featuring Mariah Carey and Flipmode Squad)	2003	Chris Robinson
"Shorty (Put It on the Floor)" (featuring Fat Joe, Chingy and Nick Cannon)	2004	Gregory Dark
"Touch It"	2005	Benny Boom, Busta Rhymes
"Touch It" (Remix) (featuring Mary J. Blige, Rah Digga, Missy Elliott, Lloyd Banks, Papoose and DMX)	2006	Benny Boom
"I Love My Bitch" (featuring Kelis and will.i.am)	2006	Benny Boom
"New York Shit" (featuring Swizz Beatz)	2006	Benny Boom, Justin Francis
"In the Ghetto" (featuring Rick James)	2006	Chris Robinson
"We Made It" (featuring Linkin Park)	2008	Chris Robinson
"Don't Touch Me (Throw da Water on 'Em)"	2008	Rage, Busta Rhymes
"I Got Bass"	2008	Vid Arroyo
"Arab Money" (featuring Ron Browz)	2008	Rik Cordero
"Arab Money" (Remix) (featuring Diddy, Ron Browz, Swizz Beatz, Akon and Lil Wayne)	2009	Rik Cordero
"Arab Money" (Remix 2) (featuring Ron Browz, Rick Ross, Spliff Star, N.O.R.E. and Red Café)	2009	Rik Cordero
"Hustler's Anthem '09" (featuring T-Pain)	2009	Hype Williams
"Respect My Conglomerate" (featuring Lil Wayne and Jadakiss)	2009	Chris Robinson
"If You Don't Know, Now You Know" (featuring Big Tigger)	2009	Aristotle, Tin Chien
"World Go Round" (featuring Estelle)	2009	Jason Goldwatch
"Why Stop Now" (featuring Chris Brown)	2012	Hype Williams, Busta Rhymes
"King Tut" (featuring Reek da Villian and J-Doe)	2012	Daniel Czernilofsky
"Doin' It Again" (featuring Reek da Villian and Chanel Nicole)	2012	Daniel Czernilofsky
"Movie" (featuring J-Doe)	2012	Daniel Czernilofsky
"#TwerkIt" (featuring Nicki Minaj)	2013	Director X
"Thank You" (featuring Q-Tip, Kanye West and Lil Wayne)	2014	Director X
"God's Plan" (featuring O.T. Genasis and J-Doe)	2015	Busta Rhymes
"Girlfriend" (featuring Vybz Kartel and Tory Lanez)	2017	Busta Rhymes, Benny Boom
"The Don & the Boss" (featuring Vybz Kartel)	2020	Benny Boom
"YUUUU" (featuring Anderson .Paak)	2020	Busta Rhymes, Benny Boom
"Master Fard Muhammad" (featuring Rick Ross)	2020	Busta Rhymes, Dre Films
"Czar" (featuring M.O.P.)	2020	Busta Rhymes, Benny Boom
"Boomp!"	2020	Busta Rhymes, Benny Boom
"Outta My Mind" (featuring Bell Biv DeVoe)	2020	Michael Garcia
"Czar (Remix)" (featuring M.O.P. and CJ)	2021	Benny Boom
"Where I Belong" (featuring Mariah Carey)	2021	Chris Robinson
"Deep Thought"	2021	Benny Boom, The Dragon
"Slap" (featuring Big Daddy Kane and Conway the Machine)	2022	Andres Alvarez, Busta Rhymes
"You Will Never Find Another Me" (featuring Mary J. Blige)	2022	Busta Rhymes, Colin Tilley
"Bulletproof Skin" (with Skillibeng)	2022	Samantha Lecca, Busta Rhymes
"Beach Ball" (featuring Bia)	2023	Michael Garcia
"Luxury Love" (featuring Coi Leray)	2023	Benny Boom

List of music videos as featured artist, with directors, showing year released
Title	Year	Director(s)
"Oh My God" (A Tribe Called Quest featuring Busta Rhymes)	1993	
"Vibin' (New Flava)" (Boyz II Men featuring Treach, Method Man, Craig Mack and Busta Rhymes)	1995	
"Change Like the Weather" (Bounty Killer featuring Busta Rhymes & Junior Reed)	1996	
"Rumble in the Jungle" (Fugees featuring A Tribe Called Quest, John Forté and Busta Rhymes)	1997	Marc Smerling, Mark Woollen
"Wild for da Night" (Rampage featuring Busta Rhymes)	1997	Steve Carr
"Curious" (LSG featuring MC Lyte, LL Cool J and Busta Rhymes)	1997	
"Victory" (Puff Daddy featuring The Notorious B.I.G. and Busta Rhymes)	1998	Marcus Nispel
"Holla Holla" (Remix) (Ja Rule featuring Jay-Z, Vita, Black Child, Tah Murdah, Memphis Bleek and Busta Rhymes)	1999	Hype Williams
"Imperial" (Rah Digga featuring Busta Rhymes)	2000	Diane Martel
"Ante Up" (Remix) (M.O.P. featuring Busta Rhymes, Remy Ma and Teflon)	2001	Chris Robinson, Jessy Terrero
"Figadoh (Remix)" (Benzino featuring Busta Rhymes and M.O.P.)	2002	
"Fire (Yes, Yes Y'all)" (Joe Budden featuring Busta Rhymes)	2003	Paul Hunter, Kevin Hunter
"Get Low" (Remix) (Lil Jon & The East Side Boyz featuring Busta Rhymes, Elephant Man and Ying Yang Twins)	2003	Gil Green
"Never Scared (Takeover Remix)" (BoneCrusher featuring Busta Rhymes, Cam'Ron & Jadakiss)	2003	
"What's Happenin'" (Method Man featuring Busta Rhymes)	2004	
"Don't Cha" (The Pussycat Dolls featuring Busta Rhymes)	2005	Paul Hunter
"Wanna Love You Girl" (Remix) (Robin Thicke featuring Busta Rhymes and Pharrell)	2006	Paul Brown
"Peace Sign" (Gym Class Heroes featuring Busta Rhymes)	2008	
"Run the Show" (Kat DeLuna featuring Busta Rhymes)	2008	Ray Kay
"Rotate" (Capone-n-Noreaga featuring Busta Rhymes)	2009	
"All I Do Is Win" (Remix) (DJ Khaled featuring T-Pain, Diddy, Nicki Minaj, Rick Ross, Busta Rhymes, Fabolous, Jadakiss, Fat Joe and Swizz Beatz)	2010	Gil Green
"Look At Me Now" (Chris Brown featuring Busta Rhymes and Lil Wayne)	2011	Colin Tilley
"The Woman You Love" (Ashanti featuring Busta Rhymes)	2011	Sean Coles, Ashanti
"Pride N Joy" (Fat Joe featuring Kanye West, Miguel, Jadakiss, Ashanti, DJ Khaled, Roscoe Dash and Busta Rhymes)	2012	Hype Williams
"Broad Daylight" (M.O.P. featuring Busta Rhymes)	2014	Mo Shines, Jay Parris
"Henny (Remix)" (Mack Wilds featuring French Montana, Mobb Deep and Busta Rhymes)	2014	G Wonders
"Nutshell Part II" (Phife Dawg featuring Busta Rhymes and Redman)	2021	Tony Reames

== See also ==
- Flipmode Squad discography
- Leaders of the New School discography
