= Rampage discography =

This is the discography of Rampage, an American rapper.

== Discography ==
=== Studio albums ===
List of studio albums, with selected chart positions
Title	Album details	Peak chart positions	
Title	Album details	US	US R&B
Scout's Honor... By Way of Blood	Released: July 29, 1997; Label: Elektra, Flipmode; Formats: CD, LP, cassette	65	15
Have You Seen?	Released: June 6, 2006; Label: Sure Shot; Formats: CD	—	—
Lieutenant on Deck	Released: September 24, 2013; Label: Seven 13, 22; Formats: digital download, streaming	—	—
"—" denotes a recording that did not chart or was not released in that territory.

=== Collaborative albums ===
List of collaborative studio albums, with selected chart positions
Title	Album details	Peak chart positions		
Title	Album details	US	US R&B	UK
The Imperial (as part of the Flipmode Squad)	Released: September 1, 1998; Label: Elektra, Flipmode; Formats: CD, LP, cassette	15	3	85
"—" denotes a recording that did not chart or was not released in that territory.

=== Unreleased albums ===
- The Red Oktoba (1994)

=== Extended plays ===
- R.E.A.L - Road to Everyone Ain't Loyal (2012)

=== Mixtapes ===
- Demagraffix: Pre-Album Mixtape (2006)
- Da Ambush, Vol. 1 (2008)
- Remington Steele (2011)
- Remington Steele - Vibes & Culture (2014)

== Singles ==
=== As lead artist ===
List of singles as lead artist, with selected chart positions, showing year released and album name
Title	Year	Peak chart positions				Album
Title	Year	US	US R&B	US Rap	US Dance	Album
"Beware of the Rampsack" (as Rampage the Last Boy Scout)	1994	—	—	48	—	Non-album single
"Wild for da Night" (as Rampage the Last Boy Scout, featuring Busta Rhymes)	1996	—	—	—	—	Scout's Honor… by Way of Blood
"Take it to the Streets" (featuring Billy Lawrence)	1997	34	11	5	3	Scout's Honor… by Way of Blood
"We Getz Down" (solo or featuring 702)	1997	—	67	19	45	Scout's Honor… by Way of Blood
"Goin' Outta Business" (featuring Busta Rhymes)	2006	—	—	—	—	Have You Seen?
"Legends" (with C-Red)	2013	—	—	—	—	Non-album single
"—" denotes a recording that did not chart or was not released in that territory.

=== As featured artist ===
List of singles as lead artist, with selected chart positions and certification, showing year released and album name
Title	Year	Peak chart positions			Album
Title	Year	US	US R&B	US Rap	Album
"Flava in Ya Ear (Remix)" (Craig Mack featuring the Notorious B.I.G., Rampage, LL Cool J and Busta Rhymes)	1994	—	—	—	Non-album singles
"Take It There" (Nonchalant featuring Rampage)	1998	—	56	8	Non-album singles
"Come Get It" (DJ Hurricane featuring Rah Digga, Rampage and Lord Have Mercy)	1999	—	73	8	Don't Sleep
"Tonight I'm Gonna Let Go (Remix)" (Syleena Johnson featuring Busta Rhymes, Rampage, Sham and Spliff Star)	2002	—	53	—	Chapter 2: The Voice
"—" denotes a recording that did not chart or was not released in that territory.

=== Promotional singles ===
List of promotional singles showing year released and album name
Title	Year	Album
"Abandon Ship" (Busta Rhymes featuring Rampage the Last Boy Scout)	1996	The Coming
"Get the Money and Dip" (featuring Busta Rhymes)	1997	Scout's Honor… by Way of Blood
"Flipmode Enemy #1" (featuring Serious)	1997	Scout's Honor… by Way of Blood
"Fallin' (Remix)" (Alicia Keys featuring Busta Rhymes and Rampage)	2001	Songs in A Minor
"Diamonds & Roses (Rashad Smith Remix)" (Damage featuring Rampage)	2002	Non-album promotional single
"Flip It" (featuring Sean Paul)	2006	Have You Seen?
"Ambush"	2007	Da Ambush, Vol. 1
"Living Foul"	2014	Non-album promotional single
"Green Card" (featuring Yaadman)	2014	Non-album promotional single

== Guest appearances ==
List of non-single guest appearances, with other performing artists, showing year released and album name
Title	Year	Other artist(s)	Album
""Spontaneous (13 MC's Deep)"	1993	Leaders of the New School • Cracker Jacks • Rumpletilskinz • Blitz • Kollie Weed	T.I.M.E. (The Inner Mind's Eye)
"Representin' Brooklyn"	1995	Doo Wop	'95 Live: The Classic Collection
"Flipmode Squad Meets Def Squad"	1996	Busta Rhymes • Jamal • Redman • Keith Murray • Lord Have Mercy	The Coming
"Freestyle"	1996	None	Power Cypha - Featuring 50 MC's
"Freestyle"	1996	Doo Wop • Busta Rhymes • Lord Have Mercy	Summer Jam '96
"Feel The Vibe"	1997	Frankie Cutlass • Doo Wop • Heltah Skeltah	Politics & Bullshit
"We Could Take It Outside"	1997	Busta Rhymes • Serious • Spliff Star • Baby Sham • Rah Digga • Lord Have Mercy	When Disaster Strikes...
"Things We Be Doin' for Money, Part 2"	1997	Busta Rhymes • Anthony Hamilton • The Chosen Generation	When Disaster Strikes...
"The Body Rock"	1997	Busta Rhymes • Sean "Puffy" Combs • Mase	When Disaster Strikes...
"Everybody, Come On"	1997	DJ Skribble • Busta Rhymes • Spliff Star • Consequence	Traffic Jams
"Settin' it Off"	1998	Busta Rhymes • Spliff Star • Baby Sham • Rah Digga	The Imperial
"I Got Your Back"	1998	Busta Rhymes • Spliff Star • Baby Sham • Rah Digga	The Imperial
"This Is What Happens"	1998	Rah Digga	The Imperial
"Where You Think You Goin'"	1998	Baby Sham • Spliff Star • Busta Rhymes • Rah Digga • Lord Have Mercy	The Imperial
"We Got U Opin, Pt. 2"	1998	Rah Digga • Spliff Star • Baby Sham • Lord Have Mercy • Busta Rhymes • Buckshot	The Imperial
"Straight Spittin'"	1998	Baby Sham • Busta Rhymes • Rah Digga • Spliff Star • Lord Have Mercy	The Imperial
"Money Talks"	1998	Busta Rhymes • Rah Digga • Spliff Star	The Imperial
"Hit Em Wit Da Heat"	1998	Baby Sham • Busta Rhymes • Rah Digga • Spliff Star • Lord Have Mercy	The Imperial
"Money Talks"	1998	Spliff Star • Busta Rhymes • Rah Digga • Baby Sham	The Imperial
"Against All Odds"	1998	Busta Rhymes • Baby Sham • Rah Digga • Spliff Star • Lord Have Mercy	Extinction Level Event: The Final World Front
"Whatcha Come Around Here For"	1999	Spliff Star • Rah Digga • Baby Sham • Busta Rhymes • Roc Marciano • Lord Have Mercy	Violator: The Album
"Freestyle"	1999	Funkmaster Flex • Baby Sham • Busta Rhymes • Rah Digga • Spliff Star • Lord Have Mercy	The Mix Tape Volume III: 60 Minutes of Funk (The Final Chapter)
"Here We Go Again"	2000	Busta Rhymes • Roc Marciano • Spliff Star • Baby Sham • Rah Digga	Anarchy
"Match the Name with the Voice"	2001	Busta Rhymes • Baby Sham • Rah Digga • Spliff Star	Genesis
"Come to the Temple"	2002	KRS-One • Busta Rhymes • Smooth B. • Rah Goddess • Fat Joe	Spiritual Minded
"Call The Ambulance"	2002	Busta Rhymes	It Ain't Safe No More...
"Wild For Da Nite"	2003	Lordz of Brooklyn	Graffiti Roc
"Come Oann"	2007	II Face	2 Faves 2 Every Story
"The Stomp"	2011	Leaf Dog • BVA MC	From a Scarecrow's Perspective
"Rebel Muzik"	2012	Beneficence	Concrete Soul
"The World is in Trouble"	2013	Θύτης	Κομμάτια
"Solid"	2015	DMX	Redemption of the Beast
"We Forever"	2016	Cappadonna • Spliff Star	The Pillage 2
"Basic Instinct"	2016	Ras Kass • 4rAx • Flobama	Lyrical HipHop Is Dead
"Brand New"	2018	DJ Flipcyide • Arkatak	Hip Hop Isn't Dead
"Runnin' from Reality"	2019	Kali Ranks • Fredro Starr • Optimystic	Living Legends
"For My People"	2019	Shane Dollar • The Beat Dungeon	The Missing Records
"Follow The Wave"	2020	Busta Rhymes • Rah Digga • Spliff Star	Extinction Level Event 2: The Wrath of God
