= DJ Scratch production discography =

This is a list of all of the songs that DJ Scratch has produced.

== 1990s ==
=== EPMD – Business As Usual (1990) ===
- 3. Rampage (featuring LL Cool J)
- 14. Funky Piano

=== Various Artists – We're All In The Same Gang (1990) ===
- 02. I Got Style (featuring New World Mafia) [co-produced with Michael Conception]
- 07. Keep Funkin' It (featuring MC KRZ) [co-produced with Johnny Jackson]
- 09. Livin' in South Central L.A. (featuring South Central Posse)

=== EPMD - "Rampage" 12" (1991) ===
- B1. "I'm Mad (Remix)"

=== EPMD – Business Never Personal (1992) ===
- 06. Scratch Bring It Back (Part 2-Mic Doc)

=== PMD – Shade Business (1994) ===
- 07. I'll Wait (featuring Zone 7)
- 08. I Saw It Cummin' {co-produced with PMD}

=== Das EFX – Hold It Down (1995) ===
- 17. Comin' Thru
- 19. Bad News (featuring PMD)

=== PMD – Business Is Business (1996) ===
- 11. Nuttin' Move (featuring Das Efx)
- 12. I'm a B-Boy

=== Busta Rhymes – Flipmode Remixes (1996) ===
- 03. Woo-Hah!! Got You All In Check (The DJ Scratch Albany Projects Remix) [featuring Rampage]
- 13. Do My Thing (DJ Scratch Remix)
- 14. Abandon Ship (DJ Scratch Remix) [featuring Rampage]

=== Busta Rhymes – The Coming (1996) ===
- 01. The Coming (Intro)
- 02. Do My Thing
- 12. The Finish Line

=== Various Artists – Set It Off (soundtrack) (1996) ===
- 05. Live to Regret |\| Busta Rhymes

=== Ill Al Skratch – Keep It Movin (1997) ===
- 06. Stick & Move

=== EPMD – Back in Business (1997) ===
- 10. Put On

=== Rampage – Scouts Honor...By Way of Blood (1997) ===
- 01. Intro (featuring DJ Scratch, Kareem, Storm & Kau Kidau)
- 02. Flipmode Iz da Squad (featuring Busta Rhymes, Lord Have Mercy, Serious & Spliff Star)
- 04. Talk of the Town
- 05. Get the Money and Dip (featuring Busta Rhymes)
- 08. Flipmode Enemy #1 (featuring Serious)
- 10. Conquer da World (featuring Meka)
- 11. Hall of Fame
- 14. Rampage Outro

=== Busta Rhymes – When Disaster Strikes... (1997) ===
- 01. Intro
- 02. The Whole World Looking at Me
- 03. Survival Hungry
- 04. When Disaster Strikes
- 06. Get High Tonight
- 11. We Could Take It Outside (featuring Flipmode Squad)
- 18. Get Off My Block (featuring Lord Have Mercy)
- 19. Outro (Preparation for the Final World Front)

=== Will Smith - "Gettin' Jiggy wit It" ===
- A2. "Gettin' Jiggy (Jiggier Remix)"

=== Funkmaster Flex – 60 Minutes of Funk – The Mix Tape Volume III (1998) ===
- 23. Wu-Tang Cream Team Line-Up (featuring The Harlem Hoodz, Inspectah Deck, Killa Sin, Method Man & Raekwon)

=== Busta Rhymes – Extinction Level Event: The Final World Front (1998) ===
- 10. Gimme Some More
- 12. Party Is Goin' on Over Here
- 13. Do the Bus A Bus!
- 19. The Burial Song (Outro)

=== Various Artists – Lyricist Lounge, Volume One (1998) ===
- 2-05. Be OK \|\ Bahamadia & Rah Digga

=== Onyx – Shut 'Em Down (1998) ===
- 03. Street Nigguz (featuring X1)
- 10. Conspiracy (featuring Clay the Raider & X1)
- 11. Black Dust (featuring X1)

=== Flipmode Squad – The Imperial (1998) ===
- 02. To My People
- 05. I Got Your Back
- 06. This Is What Happens
- 07. Everybody on the Line Outside
- 09. Where You Think You Goin'
- 12. Money Talks
- 13. Cha Cha Cha
- 15. Do for Self

=== DJ Clue – The Professional (1998) ===
- 11. Whatever You Want (featuring Flipmode Squad)

=== Q-Tip – Amplified (1999) ===
- 09. Do It (featuring Jessica Rivera)
- 11. N.T. (featuring Busta Rhymes)

=== Method Man & Redman – Blackout! (1999) ===
- 10. 1, 2, 1, 2

=== Pharoahe Monch – Internal Affairs (1999) ===
- 01. Intro
- 09. Right Here

=== EPMD – Out of Business (1999) ===
- 01. Intro

=== 50 Cent – Power of the Dollar (1999) ===
- 16. I'm a Hustler

=== Funkmaster Flex & Big Kap – The Tunnel (1999) ===
- 15. Ill Bomb (featuring LL Cool J)

== 2000s ==
=== Lord Have Mercy – Thee Ungodly Hour (2000) ~~(Unreleased)~~ ===
- 00. Wicked Ways
- 00. Vengeance
- 00. The Last Night on This Earth
- 00. 6 Million Ways

=== Busta Rhymes – Anarchy (2000) ===
- 02. Salute da Gods!!
- 16. We Comin' Through
- 17. C'mon All My Niggaz, C'mon All My Bitches

=== Erick Sermon – Def Squad Presents Erick Onasis (2000) ===
- 02. I Do 'Em

=== LL Cool J – G.O.A.T. (2000) ===
- 04. LL Cool J (featuring Kandice Love)
- 11. Hello (featuring Amil)
- 12. You and Me (featuring Kelly Price)
- 13. Homicide
- 14. U Can't Fuck With Me (featuring Jayo Felony, Snoop Dogg & Xzibit)
- 17. Ill Bomb (featuring Funkmaster Flex & Big Kap)

=== Various Artists – Any Given Sunday (soundtrack) (2000) ===
- 05. Shut 'Em Down \|\ LL Cool J

=== Guru – Jazzmatazz, Vol. 3: Streetsoul (2000) ===
- 02. Keep Your Worries (featuring Angie Stone)

=== Half-A-Mill – Milíon (2000) ===
- 06. Don't Go Away

=== Tony Touch – The Piece Maker (2000) ===
- 06. Likwit Rhyming (featuring Defari, Tash & Xzibit)

=== Various Artists – Bamboozled (soundtrack) (2000) ===
- 01. Blak Iz Blak |\| Mau Maus

=== Tha Liks – X.O. Experience (2001) ===
- 06. Bully Foot (featuring Busta Rhymes)

=== Sticky Fingaz – Black Trash: The Autobiography of Kirk Jones (2001) ===
- 07. Why (featuring Still Livin & X1)
- 11. Baby Brother (featuring Dave Hollister)
- 17. Get It Up (featuring Fredro Starr)

=== Busta Rhymes – It Ain't Safe No More (2002) ===
- 03. What Do You Do When You're Branded

=== The Roots – Phrenology (2002) ===
- 02. Rock You {co-produced by the Grand Wizards}

=== Talib Kweli – Quality (2002) ===
- 04. Shock Body (featuring McKay)

=== Snoop Dogg – Snoop Dogg Presents…Doggy Style Allstars Vol. 1 (2002) ===
- 11. I Just Get Carried Away (featuring Reo Varnado & Vinnie Bernard)

=== DMX – Grand Champ (2003) ===
- 17. The Rain

=== DJ Kay Slay – The Streetsweeper Vol. 1 (2003) ===
- 04. 50 Shot Ya (featuring 50 Cent)

=== Various Artists – Honey (soundtrack) (2003) ===
- 09. Now Ride \|\ Fabolous

=== Monica – After the Storm (2003) ===
- 02. Get It Off (featuring Dirtbag) {co-produced with Craig Brockman}

=== Cassidy – I'm a Hustla (2005) ===
- 07. Can't Fade Me (featuring Nas & Quan)

=== Beanie Sigel – The B. Coming (2005) ===
- 06. Purple Rain (featuring Bun B)

=== Busta Rhymes – The Big Bang (2006) ===
- 04. New York Shit
  - Samples "Faded Lady" by Soul Sensual Orchestra

=== Wu-Tang Clan – 8 Diagrams (2007) ===
- 00. Watch Your Mouth {co-produced with RZA}

=== LL Cool J – Exit 13 (2008) ===
- 09. Rocking with the G.O.A.T.
- 10. This Is Ring Tone M... (featuring Grandmaster Caz)

=== Busta Rhymes – I Bullshit You Not (mixtape) (2009) ===
- 01. Fate of The World
- 02. Director's Cut (featuring Uncle Murda)
- 03. Let's Do It (featuring Spliff Star)
- 04. Foreign Currency (featuring Maino)
- 05. Piano Man (featuring Spliff Star & Reek Da Villian)
- 06. Death Wish (featuring Raekwon)
- 07. Try Your Hands (featuring Show Money)
- 08. The Game Room (Featuring Lil' Fame)
- 09. Victim
- 10. Give a Damn (featuring Show Money & Reek Da Villian)
- 11. Bounce Back
- 12. Feel My Pain

=== Busta Rhymes – Back on My B.S. (2009) ===
- 01. Wheel of Fortune
- 08. I'm'A Go and Get My... (featuring Mike Epps)

=== Method Man & Redman – Blackout! 2 (2009) ===
- 12. Dis Iz 4 All My Smokers

== 2010s ==
=== DJ Kay Slay – More Than Just a DJ (2010) ===
- 01. Intro (featuring Busta Rhymes)

=== Busta Rhymes & Q-Tip – The Abstract and the Dragon (2013) ===
- 03. Gettin' Up (DJ Scratch Remix)

== 2020s ==
=== Busta Rhymes – Extinction Level Event 2: The Wrath of God (2020) ===
- 09. Boomp!

=== RZA / Bobby Digital – Saturday Afternoon Kung Fu Theater (2022) ===
- whole album
