= Flipmode =

Flipmode may refer to:

- Flipmode Entertainment, now Conglomerate, a record label founded in 1996 by Busta Rhymes
- Flipmode Squad, an American hip hop collective
- "Flipmode" (song), a 2017 song by Fabolous, Chris Brown, and Velous
- "Flipmode" (Space Ghost Coast to Coast), a television episode
