= Don't Touch Me (Throw da Water on 'Em) =

Single by Busta Rhymes

from the album Back on My B.S. (intended)
- Released: April 15, 2008 (iTunes)
- Recorded: 2007
- Genre: Hip hop
- Length: 3:33
- Label: Flipmode; Aftermath; Interscope
- Songwriter(s): Trevor Smith Jr.
- Producer(s): Grind Music

Busta Rhymes singles chronology
"Run the Show" (2008)	"Don't Touch Me (Throw da Water on 'Em)" (2008)	"We Made It" (2008)

"Don't Touch Me (Throw da Water on 'Em)" is a promo single for rapper Busta Rhymes's album Back on My B.S.. It was produced by Grind Music (LV & Sean C) for The Hitmen. The song samples "I Can Give You Love" by 1960s/1970s soul band The Diplomats (not to be confused with the rap crew). The official remix features Reek Da Villain, Spliff Star, Lil Wayne, Nas, The Game, and Big Daddy Kane. It was played during the opening act of the MTV Movie Awards for a dance off between Chris Brown and Mike Myers.

The track reached #83 on the Billboard Hot R&B/Hip-Hop Songs chart. It was also featured in the video game NBA Live 09. When the album Back on My B.S. was officially released, this track did not appear on the album.

== Remixes ==
An official remix was released through the Internet. It features Reek da Villain, Spliff Star, Lil Wayne, Nas, The Game and Big Daddy Kane. The song is 4:56 and is longer than the original.

Another remix was done by Travis Barker. Asher Roth also made a freestyle over the song's instrumental.

== Music video ==
The music video directed by Dale "Rage" Resteghini premiered on BET on Tuesday, April 29, the same day as the video for the second single, "We Made It". The video features cameos from the Aphilliates Music Group (DJ Drama, DJ Don Cannon, La the Darkman, Willie the Kid) and the current members of the Flipmode Squad.

== Uses ==
This song has been used on several occasions in the So You Think You Can Dance competition which boosted the song's popularity.

It has also become an anthem for dance crews everywhere after its use by the ACDC or Adam/Chu Dance Crew (formed by actor/dancer Adam Sevani & film director Jon M. Chu) who collaborated on the films, Step Up 2 The Streets & Step Up 3.

The song is also available as DLC in the game Dance Central.

== Track listing ==
1. "Don't Touch Me (Throw da Water on 'em)" (Clean)
2. "Don't Touch Me (Throw da Water on 'em)" (Dirty)
3. "Don't Touch Me (Throw da Water on 'em)" (Instrumental)
