= Flava in Ya Ear =

1994 single by Craig Mack

Single by Craig Mack

from the album Project: Funk da World
- Released: July 26, 1994
- Recorded: 1994
- Studio: The Hit Factory, New York City
- Genre: Hardcore hip hop
- Length: 3:38
- Label: Bad Boy; Arista
- Songwriter: Craig Mack
- Producer: Easy Mo Bee

Craig Mack singles chronology
"You Don't Have to Worry" (1993)	"Flava in Ya Ear" (1994)	"Flava in Ya Ear (Remix)" (1994)

Music video
- "Flava in Ya Ear" on YouTube

"Flava in Ya Ear" is a song by American rapper Craig Mack. It was sent to urban radio on June 21, 1994, and released commercially in the United States on July 26, 1994, by Bad Boy Records and Arista Records as the lead single from his debut studio album, Project: Funk da World (1994). The song was remixed with the addition of rappers The Notorious B.I.G., Rampage, LL Cool J and Busta Rhymes.

The single peaked at number nine on the US Billboard Hot 100. It was certified Platinum by the RIAA and has sold over 1,000,000 copies in the United States. The song received a Grammy Award nomination for Best Rap Solo Performance at the 37th Grammy Awards in 1995, losing to "U.N.I.T.Y." by Queen Latifah. It was ranked as the 422nd greatest song of all time by Rolling Stone Magazine in 2021. The beat of the song was also ranked as the fourth greatest hip-hop beat of all time by Rock the Bells in 2024.

== Background ==
Easy Mo Bee has stated that the instrumental was originally intended for Apache, who was unable to record the song due to being on tour with the group Naughty by Nature at the time, and was not sure of future recordings at the time. As a result, Mo Bee gave the instrumental to Craig Mack after Bad Boy Records' founder Sean Combs gave him a substantial amount of money for the instrumental.

== Music video ==
The accompanying music video for the song was directed by Craig Henry. It was filmed in and outside of the New York Hall of Science in Queens, New York City, as well as in front of the nearby Unisphere, the spinning globe. The video was nominated for New Artist Clip of the Year in the category for Rap at the 1994 Billboard Music Video Awards.

== Remix ==
"Flava in Ya Ear (Remix)"

Single by Craig Mack featuring the Notorious B.I.G., Rampage, LL Cool J and Busta Rhymes

from the album Bad Boy's 10th Anniversary... The Hits
- Released: October 1994
- Recorded: 1994
- Studio: The Hit Factory, New York City
- Genre: Hardcore hip hop
- Length: 5:02
- Label: Bad Boy; Arista
- Songwriters: Craig Mack; Christopher Wallace; Roger McNair; James Smith; Trevor Smith
- Producers: Easy Mo Bee; Chucky Thompson; Sean "Puffy" Combs

Craig Mack singles chronology
"Flava in Ya Ear" (1994)	"Flava in Ya Ear (Remix)" (1994)	"Get Down" (1994)

The Notorious B.I.G. singles chronology
"Juicy" (1994)	"Flava in Ya Ear (Remix)" (1994)	"Big Poppa" (1994)

Rampage singles chronology
"Beware of the Rampsack" (1994)	"Flava in Ya Ear (Remix)" (1994)	"Wild for da Night" (1996)

LL Cool J singles chronology
"Stand by Your Man" (1993)	"Flava in Ya Ear (Remix)" (1994)	"Hey Lover" (1995)

Busta Rhymes singles chronology
"Oh My God" (1994)	"Flava in Ya Ear (Remix)" (1994)	"Come wit da Git Down (Buckwild Remix)" (1994)

Music video
- "Flava in Ya Ear (Remix)" on YouTube

The remix of "Flava in Ya Ear" features American rappers the Notorious B.I.G., Rampage, LL Cool J and Busta Rhymes. It also contains a new verse by Craig Mack himself as well as ad libs by Puff Daddy and brief singing by Keisha Spivey. The remix was included in Bad Boy's 10th Anniversary... The Hits album.

The music video for the remix was directed by Hype Williams, and was filmed on a soundstage in black-and-white by Isidro Urquia. It features all the artists from the song, as well as guest appearances by Das EFX, Mic Geronimo, Irv Gotti and Funkmaster Flex, although none perform on the song.

== Charts ==
=== Weekly charts ===
Chart (1994)	Peak position
UK Singles (Official Charts)	57
UK Club Chart (Music Week)	75
US Billboard Hot 100	9
US Hot R&B/Hip-Hop Songs (Billboard)	4
US Hot Rap Songs (Billboard)	1
US Maxi-Singles Sales (Billboard)	1
US Rhythmic Airplay (Billboard)	24

=== Year-end charts ===
Chart (1994)	Position
US Billboard Hot 100	81
US Hot R&B/Hip-Hop Songs (Billboard)	33
US Maxi-Singles Sales (Billboard)	2

Chart (1995)	Position
US Hot R&B/Hip-Hop Songs (Billboard)	92

== Certifications ==
Region	Certification	Certified units/sales
United States (RIAA)	Platinum	1,000,000^{^}
^{^} Shipments figures based on certification alone.
