= Have You Seen? =

Studio album by Rampage
- Released: June 6, 2006
- Recorded: 2005–2006
- Genre: East Coast hip hop
- Length: 75:25
- Labels: Flipmode; Sure Shot
- Producers: Michael Kirlew (exec.); Al Motley (exec.); Rampage (exec.); Felony Muzik (also exec.); Prayon; DJ Scratch; Mac G; The Boogiii Men; The Neptunes; Yountie Strickland; Turay; DJ Blaze (co.)

Rampage chronology
| The Imperial (1998) | Have You Seen? (2006) |

Have You Seen? is the second studio album by American rapper Rampage. It was released on June 6, 2006, via Sure Shot Recordings and Flipmode Entertainment. Audio production of the twenty-seven-track record was handled by Felony Muzik, Prayon, Mac G, The Boogiii Men, DJ Scratch, The Neptunes, Turay, Yountie Strickland, and DJ Blaze. Sean Paul, Lady Day, City Boyz, DJ Kool, Hollywood Dave made guest appearances on the album, as well as Rampage's Flipmode Squad bandmate Busta Rhymes.

== Track listing ==
| No. | Title | Writer(s) | Producer(s) | Length |
|---|---|---|---|---|
| 1. | "Intro" | D. McKinnis; R. McNair | Felony Music | 1:26 |
| 2. | "Who's That" (featuring Lady Day) | E. Prion; R. McNair | Prayon | 3:35 |
| 3. | "Busta Skit" | T. Smith; R. McNair | | 0:41 |
| 4. | "Goin' Outta Business" (featuring Busta Rhymes) | G. Spivey; R. McNair | DJ Scratch | 2:51 |
| 5. | "Skit" | R. McNair | | 0:46 |
| 6. | "Incredible" (featuring Lady Day) | D. Pringle; D. McKinnis; R. McNair | Felony Music | 3:13 |
| 7. | "Flip It" (featuring Sean Paul) | E. Prion; R. McNair | Prayon; DJ Blaze (co.) | 3:12 |
| 8. | "Stack Chips" (featuring Felony Music) | D. Durrell; D. McKinnis; V. Vick; A. Turner; K. Rice; R. McNair | The Boogiii Men | 2:52 |
| 9. | "Skit" | R. McNair | | 0:16 |
| 10. | "Personal" (featuring Felony Music) | D. McKinnis; R. McNair | Felony Music | 3:19 |
| 11. | "Freeze" | D. Durrell; V. Vick; A. Turner; K. Rice; R. McNair | The Boogiii Men | 3:08 |
| 12. | "Hold Up" | D. McKinnis; R. McNair | Felony Music | 3:26 |
| 13. | "Break It Down" | D. McKinnis; R. McNair | Felony Music | 2:53 |
| 14. | "No Love In The Room" | J. Russ; R. McNair | Mac G | 4:29 |
| 15. | "Come On Now" (featuring DJ Kool) | D. McKinnis; R. McNair | Felony Music | 3:08 |
| 16. | "I'm Rollin' With You" | C. Hugo; P. Williams; R. McNair | The Neptunes | 3:33 |
| 17. | "Skit" | D. Pringle; R. McNair | | 0:23 |
| 18. | "Badness" | D. McKinnis; R. McNair | Felony Music; DJ Blaze (co.) | 3:16 |
| 19. | "Set It" | J. Russ; R. McNair | Mac G | 3:17 |
| 20. | "Ball All Day" | D. McKinnis; R. McNair | Felony Music | 3:12 |
| 21. | "Ridin' Dirty" | E. Prion; R. McNair | Prayon; Felony Music (co.) | 3:12 |
| 22. | "If I Ruled The World" (featuring Hollywood Dave) | D. Kirkland; Y. Strickland; R. McNair | Yountie Strickland | 3:20 |
| 23. | "Outro" | D. McKinnis; R. McNair | Felony Music | 1:54 |
| 24. | "Game Lock" | D. Wesley; R. McNair | Turay | 3:30 |
| 25. | "Let's Get It On" (featuring City Boyz) | J. Russ; S. Gunz; S. Whyte; R. McNair | Mac G | 3:34 |
| 26. | "Nothing In This World" | R. McNair | | 3:25 |
| 27. | "Native New Yorker" | D. McKinnis; R. McNair | Felony Music | 3:34 |
| Total length: | | | | 1:15:25 |

== Personnel ==
- Roger "Rampage" McNair - main artist, executive producer
- Dereck Z. McKinnis - guest artist (tracks: 8, 10), producer (tracks: 1, 6, 10, 12–13, 15, 18, 20, 23, 27), co-producer (track 21), executive producer, mixing & recording (tracks: 1–2, 4, 6–8, 10–15, 18–21, 23, 25, 27)
- D. "Lady Day" Pringle - guest artist (tracks: 2, 6, 17)
- Trevor George Smith Jr. - guest artist (tracks: 3–4)
- Sean Paul Ryan Francis Henriques - guest artist (track 7)
- John W. Bowman Jr. - guest artist (track 15)
- "Hollywood Dave" Kirkland - guest artist (track 22)
- Eran Prion - producer (tracks: 2, 7, 21)
- Jermaine Russ - producer (tracks: 14, 19, 25)
- George Spivey - producer (track 4)
- Chad Hugo - producer (track 16)
- Pharrell Williams - producer (track 16)
- Yountie Strickland - producer (track 22)
- D. "Turay" Wesley - producer (track 24)
- Al Motley - executive producer, management
- Isaac "Ike" Hamm III - management
