= Take It to the Streets (song) =

1997 single by Rampage featuring Billy Lawrence

Single by Rampage featuring Billy Lawrence

from the album Scout's Honor… by Way of Blood
- Released: July 1, 1997
- Recorded: 1996
- Genre: Hip hop; R&B
- Length: 3:38
- Label: Flipmode; Elektra
- Songwriter(s): Roger McNair; Billy Lawrence; Rashad Smith; Armando Colon; Galen Underwood; Bert Reid
- Producer(s): Rashad Smith; Armando Colon

Rampage singles chronology
"Wild for da Night" (1996)	"Take It to the Streets" (1997)	"We Getz Down" (1997)

Billy Lawrence singles chronology
"Come On" (1997)	"Take It to the Streets" (1997)	"Up & Down" (1997)

"Take It to the Streets" is a song by American rapper Rampage featuring American singer Billy Lawrence. It was released as the second single from Rampage's debut studio album Scout's Honor… by Way of Blood on July 1, 1997, by Flipmode Entertainment and Elektra Records. The song was written by Rampage, Lawrence and its producers Rashad Smith and Armando Colon. The song sample of Unlimited Touch's 1981 single "I Hear Music in the Streets".

Released in the summer of 1997, "Take It to the Streets" became both Rampage and Billy Lawrence's biggest hit, reaching number 34 on the Billboard Hot 100 and number five on the Hot Rap Singles chart.

== Composition ==
"Take It to the Streets" was composed in 4/4 time and the key of G major, with a tempo of 102 beats per minute. It has a duration time of three minutes and thirty-eight seconds.

== Single track listing ==
=== A-Side ===
1. "Take It to the Streets" (LP Version) – 3:38
2. "Take It to the Streets" (Instrumental) – 3:38

=== B-Side ===
1. "Wild for da Night" (LP Version) – 4:34
2. "Wild for da Night" (Instrumental) – 4:32

== Chart history ==
=== Peak positions ===
Chart (1997)	Peak position
Billboard Hot 100	34
Billboard Hot R&B/Hip-Hop Singles & Tracks	11
Billboard Hot Rap Singles	5
Billboard Hot Dance Music/Maxi-Singles Sales	3

=== Year-End charts ===
End of year chart (1997)	Position
Billboard Hot R&B/Hip-Hop Singles & Tracks Sales	78
Billboard Hot Rap Singles	20
