= Dirty Harriet =

Studio album by Rah Digga
- Released: April 4, 2000
- Recorded: 1998–2000
- Genre: Hardcore hip hop
- Length: 66:00
- Label: Flipmode Iz da Squad!!; Flipmode; Brooklyn; Elektra
- Producer: Busta Rhymes; DJ Premier; Pete Rock; DJ Scratch; Nottz; Rick St. Hilaire; Knobody; Rockwilder; Shok

Rah Digga chronology
| The Imperial (1998) | Dirty Harriet (2000) | The Wrong Bitch To Fuck Wit! (2003) |

Rah Digga solo chronology
| Dirty Harriet (2000) | The Wrong Bitch To Fuck Wit! (2003) |

Singles from Dirty Harriet
- 1. "Tight" Released: 1999; 2. "Imperial" Released: 1999; 3. "Break Fool" Released: 2000

Dirty Harriet is the debut studio album by American rapper Rah Digga. It was released via Flipmode/Elektra in 2000. The album sold over 311,000 units in the United States. It reached number 18 on the Billboard 200 albums chart and number three on the Top R&B/Hip-Hop Albums chart.

== Critical reception ==
Professional ratings
Review scores
| Source | Rating |
|---|---|
| AllMusic | 4/5 stars |
| Entertainment Weekly | B+ |
| NME | 3.5/5 stars |
| RapReviews | 8/10 |
| USA Today | 3/4 stars |

Entertainment Weekly wrote that "Dirty Harriet's production dream team ... takes a head-spinning tour through rap regionalism, from Southern booty bumps to East Coast Wu-Tangy coffin chillers." Exclaim! thought that the "gritty soundscapes are a potent backdrop to Digga's authoritative sandpaper-rough voice." The Washington Post wrote that "Digga is a punch-line MC who loves to draw out the final jab until it burns like a schoolyard taunt."

== Track listing ==
Credits adapted from the album's liner notes.

| No. | Title | Writer(s) | Producer(s) | Length |
|---|---|---|---|---|
| 1. | "Intro" | | Knobody | 2:49 |
| 2. | "Harriet Thugman" | Rashia Fisher | Busta Rhymes | 1:48 |
| 3. | "Tight" | Fisher; Richard Evans | Mr. Walt of the Beatminerz | 3:14 |
| 4. | "What They Call Me" | Fisher; James Brown | Pete Rock | 3:49 |
| 5. | "Do The Ladies Run This..." (featuring Eve and Sonja Blade) | Fisher; Eve Cooper; Sonja Blade | Shok of Ruff Ryders | 4:02 |
| 6. | "Imperial" (featuring Busta Rhymes) | Fisher; Trevor Smith; Lloyd Ferguson; Donat Mittoo; Fitzroy Simpson; Leroy Sibbles; Robbie Lyn; Headley Bennett; Huford Brown | Shok of Ruff Ryders | 6:42 |
| 7. | "Curtains" | Fisher | Busta Rhymes | 3:53 |
| 8. | "Showdown" | Fisher | Nottz | 3:34 |
| 9. | "The Last Word" (featuring Outsidaz) | Fisher; Dwayne Battle; Jerome Hinds; Tyree Smith; Brian Bostic; Denton Dawson; Aubrey King; Shakir Abdullah; Samad Ali Selby; Salih Scaife | Nottz | 4:17 |
| 10. | "Break Fool" | Fisher | Rockwilder | 3:28 |
| 11. | "Straight Spittin', Part II" | Fisher | Nottz | 2:34 |
| 12. | "What's Up Wit' That" | Fisher | Nottz | 3:59 |
| 13. | "So Cool" (featuring Carl Thomas) | Fisher; Carl Thomas | Dave Atkinson | 3:22 |
| 14. | "Just For You" (featuring Flipmode Squad) | Fisher; Roger McNair; William Lewis; Leroy Jones; Wayne Notise | Nottz | 4:59 |
| 15. | "Fuck Y'all Niggas" (featuring Young Zee of Outsidaz) | Fisher; Dwayne Battle | Megahertz | 2:56 |
| 16. | "Lessons Of Today" | Fisher; Dana Owens; Mark Howard James | DJ Premier | 4:55 |
| 17. | "Handle Your B.I." (bonus track) | Fisher | DJ Scratch | 3:29 |
| 18. | "Clap Your Hands" (bonus track) | Fisher | Megahertz | 3:08 |
| Total length: | | | | 66:00 |

== Personnel ==
- Rashia Tashan Fisher – vocals
- Trevor George Smith Jr. – vocals (tracks: 6, 14), production (tracks: 2, 7), executive production
- Roger McNair – vocals (tracks: 1, 14)
- William A. Lewis – vocals (tracks: 1, 14)
- Dewayne Battle – vocals (tracks: 9, 15)
- Wayne Notise – vocals (tracks: 7, 14)
- Rakeem Calief Myer – vocals (tracks: 9, 14)
- Eve Jihan Jeffers – vocals (track 5)
- Sonja Shenelle Holder – vocals (track 5)
- Tyree Smith – vocals (track 9)
- Aubrey King – vocals (track 9)
- Brian Bostic – vocals (track 9)
- Denton Dawes – vocals (track 9)
- Jerome Derek Hinds Jr. – vocals (track 9)
- Salih Ibn Al Bayyinah Scaife – vocals (track 9)
- Shakir Nur-al-din Abdullah – vocals (track 9)
- Carlton Neron Thomas – vocals (track 13)
- Leroy Jones – rapping (track 14)
- Dominick J. Lamb – production (tracks: 8–9, 11–12, 14)
- Michael Gomez – production (tracks: 5–6)
- Dorsey Wesley – production (tracks: 15, 18)
- Jerome Foster – production (track 1)
- Walter V. Dewgarde Jr. – production (track 3)
- Peter O. Philips – production (track 4)
- Dana Stinson – production (track 10)
- Dave Atkinson – production (track 13)
- Christopher Edward Martin – production (track 16)
- George Spivey – production (track 17)

== Charts ==
=== Weekly charts ===
| Chart (2000) | Peak position |
|---|---|
| US Billboard 200 | 18 |
| US Top R&B/Hip-Hop Albums (Billboard) | 3 |

=== Year-end charts ===
| Chart (2000) | Position |
|---|---|
| US Top R&B/Hip-Hop Albums (Billboard) | 94 |
