= The Imperial (Flipmode Squad album) =

Studio album by Flipmode Squad
- Released: September 1, 1998
- Studio: Soundtrack (New York City)
- Genre: Hip hop
- Length: 1:14:32
- Label: Flipmode Iz da Squad!!; Flipmode; Violator; Elektra
- Producer: Busta Rhymes; Da Beatminerz; DJ Scratch; L.E.S.; M.D.; Rockwilder; Swizz Beatz; Tony Touch

Busta Rhymes chronology
When Disaster Strikes... (1997)	The Imperial (1998)	Extinction Level Event: The Final World Front (1998)

Rampage chronology
Scout's Honor… by Way of Blood (1997)	The Imperial (1998)	Have You Seen? (2006)

Rah Digga chronology
The Imperial (1998)	Dirty Harriet (2000)

Singles from The Imperial
- 1. "Everybody on the Line Outside" Released: 1998; 2. "Cha Cha Cha" Released: 1998

Professional ratings
Review scores
Source	Rating
AllMusic	2.5/5 stars
Entertainment Weekly	B
The Source	3.5/5 stars

The Imperial is the only studio album by American hip hop group Flipmode Squad. It was released on September 1, 1998, via Flipmode Entertainment and Violator Management; with distribution via Elektra Records. The recording sessions took place at Soundtrack Studios in New York. The album was produced by DJ Scratch, Busta Rhymes, Da Beatminerz, L.E.S., M.D., Rockwilder, Swizz Beatz, and Tony Touch. It features a guest appearance from Buckshot on "We Got U Opin, Pt. 2".

The album peaked at number 15 on the Billboard 200 and number 3 on the Top R&B/Hip-Hop Albums in the United States, and at number 85 on the UK Albums Chart. Its single "Cha Cha Cha" made it to No. 61 on the US Hot R&B/Hip-Hop Songs and No. 54 on the UK Singles Chart. Music videos were directed for "Everybody on the Line Outside" and "Cha Cha Cha".

== Track listing ==
No.	Title	Writer(s)	Producer(s)	Length
1.	"The Imperial Intro"			5:00
2.	"To My People"	Trevor Smith; William Lewis; Roger McNair; Rashia Fisher; Leroy Jones; George Spivey	DJ Scratch	4:56
3.	"Settin' It Off"	Smith; Lewis; McNair; Fisher; Jones; Douglas M.D. Brinson	M.D.	4:22
4.	"Run for Cover"	Smith; Lewis; McNair; Fisher; Jones; Wayne Notise; Kasseem Dean	Swizz Beatz	3:29
5.	"I Got Your Back"	Smith; Lewis; McNair; Fisher; Jones; Spivey	DJ Scratch	5:49
6.	"This Is What Happens"	McNair; Fisher; Spivey	DJ Scratch	5:30
7.	"Everybody on the Line Outside"	Smith; McNair; Notise; Spivey	DJ Scratch	5:06
8.	"Last Night"	Smith; Lewis	Busta Rhymes	3:59
9.	"Where You Think You Goin'"	Smith; Lewis; McNair; Fisher; Jones; Notise; Spivey	DJ Scratch	4:40
10.	"We Got U Opin, Pt. 2" (featuring Buckshot)	Smith; Lewis; McNair; Fisher; Jones; Notise; Kenyatta Blake; Walter Dewgarde	Da Beatminerz	5:02
11.	"Straight Spittin"	Smith; Lewis; McNair; Fisher; Jones; Notise; Joseph Hernandez	Tony Touch	4:43
12.	"Money Talks"	Smith; Lewis; McNair; Fisher; Spivey	DJ Scratch	4:26
13.	"Cha Cha Cha"	Smith; Lewis; Fisher; Jones; Spivey	DJ Scratch	4:11
14.	"Hit Em Wit da Heat"	Smith; Lewis; McNair; Fisher; Jones; Notise; Dana Stinson	Rockwilder	4:17
15.	"Do for Self"	Lewis; Jones; Spivey	DJ Scratch	5:22
16.	"Everything"	Smith; Lewis; McNair; Fisher; Jones	L.E.S.	3:40
Total length:				1:14:32

== Personnel ==
Flipmode Squad

- Trevor "Busta Rhymes" Smith – performer (tracks: 2–5, 7–14, 16), producer (track 8), arranging (tracks: 2–16), executive producer
- William "Spliff Star" Lewis – performer (tracks: 2–5, 8–16)
- Roger "Rampage" McNair – performer (tracks: 2–7, 9–12, 14, 16)
- Rashia "Rah Digga" Fisher – performer (tracks: 2–6, 9–14, 16)
- Leroy "Baby Sham" Jones – performer (tracks: 2–5, 9–11, 13–16)
- Wayne "Lord Have Mercy" Notise – performer (tracks: 4, 7, 9–11, 14)

Technical

- Kenyatta "Buckshot" Blake – performer (track 10)
- George "DJ Scratch" Spivey – producer (tracks: 2, 5–7, 9, 12, 13, 15), arranging (tracks: 2, 5, 6, 9, 12, 13), executive producer
- Douglas "M.D." Brinson – producer (track 3)
- Kasseem "Swizz Beatz" Dean – producer (track 4)
- Walter "Mr. Walt" Dewgarde – producer & arranging (track 10)
- Joseph "Tony Touch" Hernandez – producer (track 11)
- Dana "Rockwilder" Stinson – producer (track 14)
- Leshan "L.E.S." Lewis – producer (track 16)
- Vinnie Nicoletti – recording (tracks: 2–5, 7–13, 15, 16), mixing (tracks: 2, 3, 5–9, 12–14, 16)
- Robert Burnette – recording (tracks: 4, 6, 7, 14), mixing (track 11)
- Andre DeBourg – recording (track 7)
- Dominick Barbera – mixing (tracks: 4, 10, 15)
- Eduardo Larez – assistant engineering (tracks: 2, 7, 9, 11), assistant recording (tracks: 4, 5, 10, 12, 13, 15, 16), assistant mixing (tracks: 4, 7, 11, 12)
- Rich Tapper – assistant engineering (tracks: 3, 10), assistant mixing (tracks: 2, 5, 6, 8, 9, 13, 14, 16)
- Jin Won Lee – assistant engineering (track 3), assistant recording (tracks: 5, 14), assistant mixing (track 15)
- Cathy Rich – assistant engineering (track 6)
- Sheldon Guide – assistant engineering (track 9), assistant recording (track 4)
- Tom Passetti – assistant recording (track 8)
- Darren Rapp – assistant recording (track 14)
- Tom Coyne – mastering
- Rick Posada – executive producer
- Gregory Burke – art direction, design
- Alli Burke – art direction
- Amy Guip – photography
- Kevin "Webb" Welch – A&R direction, management
- Lisa Aird – A&R coordination

== Charts ==
Chart (1998)	Peak position
UK Albums (OCC)	85
US Billboard 200	15
US Top R&B/Hip-Hop Albums (Billboard)	3
