= Reek da Villian =

American rapper (born 1989)

Reek Da Villan
- Also known as: Playboy Reek
- Born: Tariek Williams; April 24, 1989 (age 37)
- Origin: Roosevelt, Long Island, New York, U.S.
- Genre: Hip-hop
- Years active: 2006–present
- Labels: oneDOTone; The Conglomerate
- Formerly of: Flipmode Squad
- Website: http://www.reekofficial.com/

Tariek Williams (born April 24, 1989), known professionally as Reek da Villain, is an American rapper from Roosevelt, Long Island, New York. He embarked on his career as the protégé of fellow Long Islander Busta Rhymes in 2006, and soon after joined his group Flipmode Squad.

== Early life ==
Rico Pleasant was born in Nassau County Roosevelt, Long Island, New York, United States. He was the third born of four siblings. As a kid he found his pleasure in music, dancing and sports. Williams started rapping at 7 years old after watching and listening to his older cousins. His father died while he was incarcerated when Williams was only 9 years old. While growing up, he idolized his older brother and cousins. That's where he first encountered rapping. He first started recording music at 15 years of age in his cousin's studio in Freeport, New York.

== Music career ==
Reek met rapper Busta Rhymes at a mixtape/clothing store called Central Station in Uniondale, New York in 2006. Reek continued to release a series of mixtapes, but his first big look was on the official remix of Busta Rhymes' "Don't Touch Me (Throw da Water on 'Em)". Soon after he appeared on BET's Rap City with The Game, Busta Rhymes, Tre Beatz and DJ Sratchator. Then a week later, he made an appearance on 106 & Park to perform with Flipmode Squad. Reek left Flipmode in February 2009, because of business reasons.

In late 2010, Reek collaborated with Busta Rhymes and Swizz Beats for the song & music titled: Mechanics.

In 2011, Reek signed to Busta Rhymes' new label Conglomerate Records and in 2012, as 'The Conglomerate', official mixtape was released.

Reek released a series of mixtapes on Busta Rhymes's Conglomerate label, but saw little action taken therefore departed ways. As of 2014, Reek was working with a NYC-based indie label, oneDOTone Records, which promotes music from hip-hop, R&B and EDM artists.

== In popular culture ==
Reek appeared on the Mo'nique show to showcase his music and give a little insight on his music career in 2012.

== Discography ==
- The Gift (2010)
- How to Be a Player (2011)
- Catastrophic (2012) (with Busta Rhymes & J Doe)
