= Rampage (rapper) =

American rapper

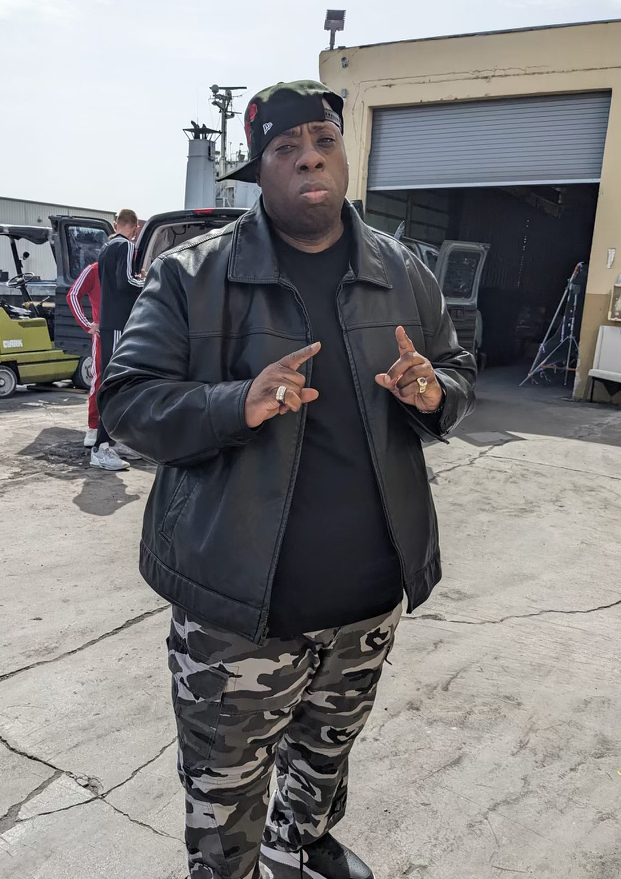
- Rampage in 2023

Background information
- Also known as: The Last Boy Scout
- Born: Roger McNair; August 1, 1974 (age 51); Brooklyn, New York City, U.S.
- Genres: Hip hop; East Coast hip hop; hardcore hip hop
- Occupation: Rapper
- Years active: 1990–present
- Labels: Conglomerate; Gracie Productions; Elektra
- Formerly of: Flipmode Squad

Roger McNair (born August 1, 1974), known professionally as Rampage (formerly Rampage the Last Boy Scout), is an American rapper who is a member of the Flipmode Squad. He is a long-time collaborator with his cousin Busta Rhymes.

== Biography ==
Rampage was born Roger McNair in Brooklyn, New York City, on August 1, 1974, to Katherine McNair and Roger Williams, who are from Jamaica.

In 1992, McNair was given his first recording deal with Dallas Austin on Rowdy / Arista Records and released the single "Beware of the Rampsack". In 1993 Rampage made his first guest appearance on the song "Spontaneous (13 MC's Deep)" off Leaders Of The New School's T.I.M.E. (The Inner Mind's Eye). In 1994, he recorded "Flava in Ya Ear In (Remix)" with Craig Mack, Notorious B.I.G., LL Cool J and Busta Rhymes. In 1996, he recorded the platinum single "Woo Hah!! Got You All in Check" with Busta Rhymes for the platinum album The Coming and released "Priority One".

One year later, he was given a second recording deal with Elektra Records and released his solo LP, Scout's Honor... by Way of Blood, which included the top-40 hit "Take It to the Streets" and "Wild for da Night". In 1998, he released The Imperial with the Flipmode Squad, which gave them their first Source Award in 1999. Since then, he has recorded with Busta Rhymes on numerous platinum albums and has appeared on various projects including a remix of the multi-platinum single "Fallin'" by Alicia Keys.

Currently based in Phoenix, Arizona, McNair signed an independent record label deal for his company DeepFreeze Entertainment (DFE) with Sure Shot Records. On that label, he has released for promotional use a single of a new group signed to DFE named Total Vision. Lady Day, a rapper, is also on the roster.

Around 2005, McNair decided to relaunch his solo career and released an official mixtape called Demagraffix which was designed as a starter for his second album, Have You Seen?, released in 2006 by Sure Shot Records.

== Discography ==
=== Studio albums ===
- Scout's Honor... by Way of Blood (1997)
- Have You Seen? (2006)
- Lieutenant on Deck (2013)

=== Collaborative albums ===
- The Imperial as part of the Flipmode Squad (1998)
