= Rah Digga =

American rapper (born 1974)

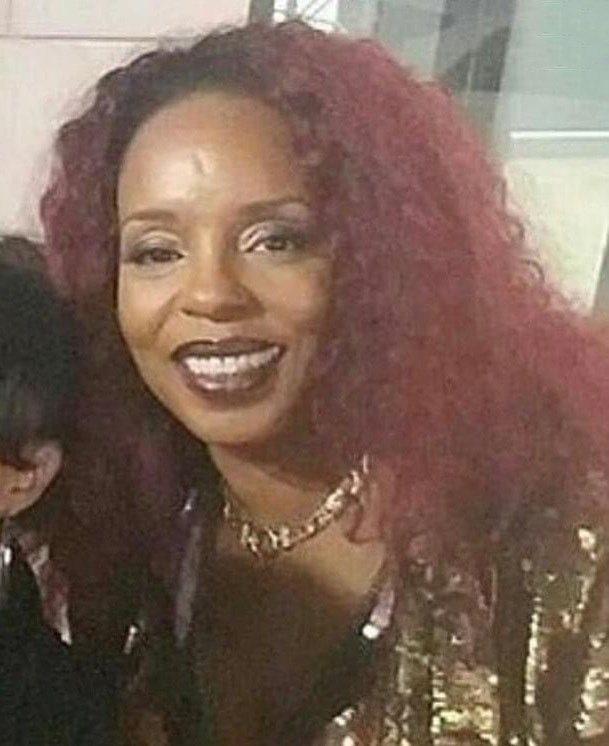

Background information
- Also known as: Harriet Thugman; Rah Diggity
- Born: Rashia Tashan Fisher; December 18, 1974 (age 51); Newark, New Jersey, U.S.
- Genre: Hip hop
- Occupations: Rapper, actress
- Years active: 1993–present
- Labels: Flipmode; Elektra; J; Raw Koncept
- Member of: Outsidaz; Flipmode Squad

Rashia Tashan Fisher (born December 18, 1974), known professionally as Rah Digga, is an American rapper and actress. She is best known as a longtime member of the Flipmode Squad, a hip hop group led by Busta Rhymes. Her debut album, Dirty Harriet (2000), peaked in the top-20 of the Billboard 200, and she released her second album, Classic, in 2010. She starred in the horror film Thirteen Ghosts (2001) as Maggie.

== Early life ==
Rah Digga was born in New Jersey. She studied electrical engineering at the New Jersey Institute of Technology. She learned how to rap by studying the raps of KRS-One, Rakim, and Kool G Rap of the Juice Crew.

== Career ==
=== Music ===
She worked with hip hop group Twice the Flavor before joining the Outsidaz, leading to a feature on the track "Cowboys" from the Fugees album The Score. She was spotted by Q-Tip at the Lyricist Lounge which led to her meeting Busta Rhymes and joining his Flipmode Squad. She has appeared on several Busta Rhymes albums. Her critically acclaimed debut album "Dirty Harriet" was released on April 4, 2000 on Flipmode/Elektra Records and is certified gold in the U.S. and platinum worldwide. She also worked with Bahamadia on the track "Be Ok" from Lyricist Lounge, Vol. 1. At that time they were the two leading women of the Lyricist Lounge movement, which also served as the home base for artists such as Mos Def, Talib Kweli, Pharoahe Monch, Common Sense, Lord Have Mercy, Foxy Brown and Shabaam Sahdeeq. In 2001 she starred in the film Thirteen Ghosts and sang the title track "Mirror Mirror" on the soundtrack. Also in 2001, she performed with Deborah Cox, Monica, Tamia and Mýa at Michael Jackson: 30th Anniversary Celebration contributing an original rap verse to "Heal the World".

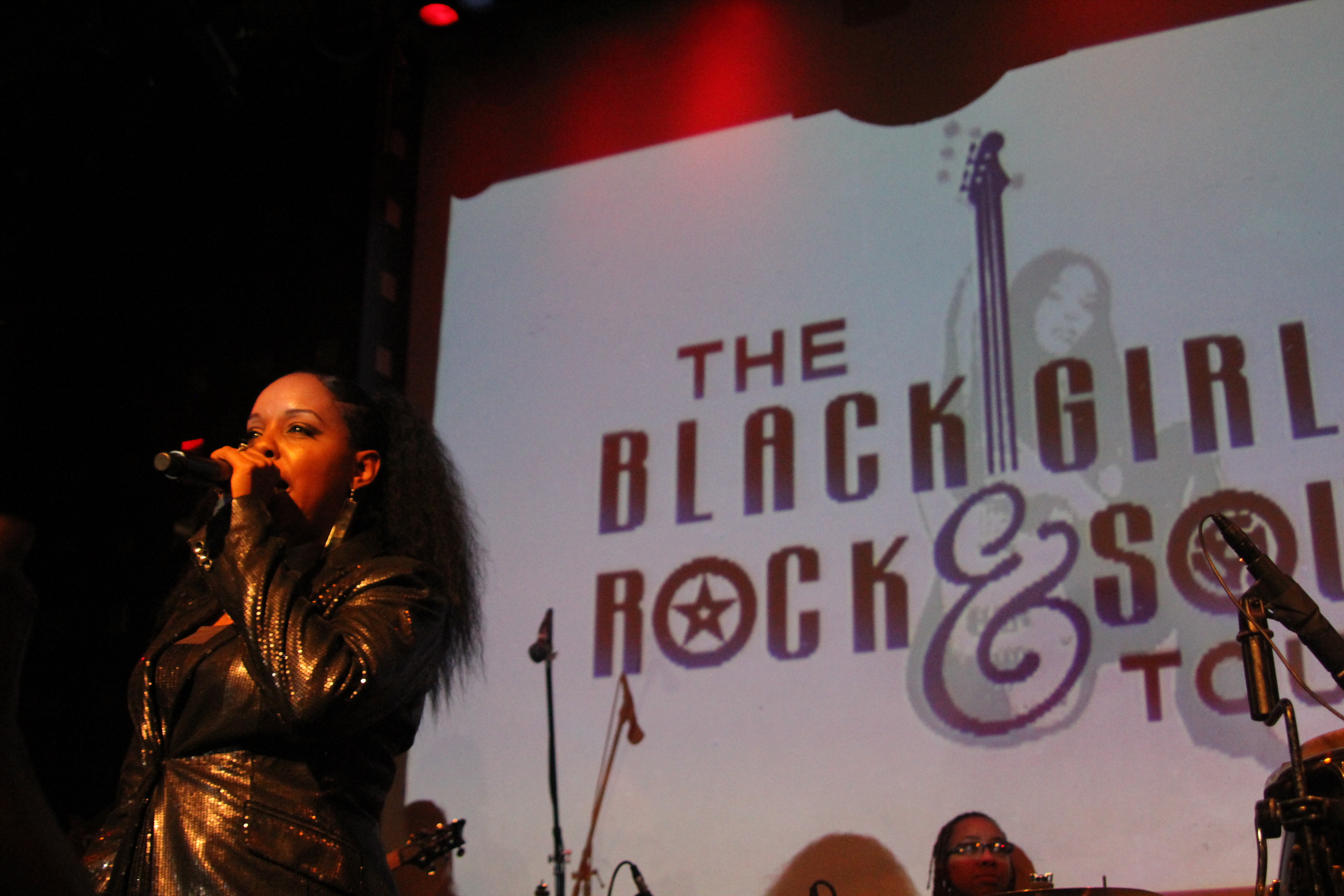
Rah Digga performing in New York City, 2011

Her second album Everything Is a Story was due to be released on Clive Davis's J Records in 2004, but was shelved. Many songs from the album had leaked to the internet in an unofficial 23-track album of unreleased material, and in 2010 Rah Digga released her own version of the album, featuring additional tracks. Rah Digga released a new album, Classic, in 2010. Production was handled by Nottz, and a promo single was released entitled "This Ain't No Lil Kid Rap". Since then she has been releasing music independently through her website Rahdiggamusic.com, SoundCloud, Bandcamp and the iTunes Store. Rah is a cultural music ambassador for the US government through her non-profit "Lyrics Matter" in conjunction with the Next Level program.

=== Acting ===
Rah Digga first appeared in Da Hip Hop Witch (2000), playing a fictionalized version of herself. She was then cast in the film Thirteen Ghosts (2001) alongside Tony Shalhoub, F. Murray Abraham, Shannon Elizabeth and Matthew Lillard in her first real acting role. In the same year, she also appeared alongside Beyoncé and Joy Bryant in MTV's Carmen: A Hip Hopera (2001). In 2003 and 2009, she was featured in the documentary films Queens of Hip Hop (with Salt-N-Pepa) and Say My Name (with Erykah Badu, Jean Grae, Miz Korona, Remy Ma, and MC Lyte, among others). Additionally, Digga has appeared as a guest star on The Mo'Nique Show. Digga made a return to acting in 2022, as a cast member of the film Stars (2022), directed by Mars Roberge. She would later collaborate with Roberge again on his horror film Rufus (2025).

== Public image and personal life ==
Rah Digga has been called "one of rap's most prominent women MCs" by AllMusic and "one of hip hop's most skilled female MCs" in the book How to Rap.

She was in a relationship with fellow rapper Young Zee. The couple has a daughter named Sativa, born in 1997.

She married partner Troy Weeks during LL Cool J's "Rock the Bells" cruise in November 2023. The ceremony was officiated by fellow rapper Big Daddy Kane.

== Discography ==
Studio albums

- Dirty Harriet (2000)
- Classic (2010)

== Filmography ==
Year	Title	Role	Notes
2000	Da Hip Hop Witch	Self	Direct-to-video
2001	Carmen: A Hip Hopera	Rasheeda	Television film
2001	Thirteen Ghosts	Maggie Bess	
2022	Stars	Oprah	Winner of "Best Ensemble cast - Feature Film" - at Marina del Rey Film Festival 2023
2022	Stars	Oprah	Best Ensemble cast nominee - Festival of Cinema NYC 2023
2025	Rufus	Louise / Clarisse	

== Awards and nominations ==
- BET Awards
  - 2006: Video of the Year ("Touch It (remix)"), Nominated
  - 2006: Best Collaboration ("Touch It (remix)"), Nominated
  - 2004: Best Female Hip-Hop Artist, Nominated
  - 2002: Best Female Hip-Hop Artist, Nominated
- BET Hip Hop Awards
  - 2006: Hip-Hop Video of the Year ("Touch It (remix)"), Nominated
  - 2006: Best Collabo ("Touch It (remix)"), Winner
  - 2006: People's Champ Award ("Touch It (remix)"), Nominated
- MTV Video Music Awards
  - 2006: Best Rap Video ("Touch It (remix)"), Nominated
  - 2006: Best Male Video ("Touch It (remix)"), Nominated
