= Scout's Honor... by Way of Blood =

Studio album by Rampage
- Released: July 29, 1997
- Recorded: 1994–97
- Genre: East Coast hip hop
- Length: 50:39
- Label: Flipmode; Violator; Elektra
- Producer: Armando Colon; DJ Scratch; Rampage; Rashad Smith; Sprague "Doogie" Williams; Teddy Riley; The Vibe Chemist Backspin

Rampage chronology
Scout's Honor... by Way of Blood (1997)	The Imperial (1998)

Singles from Scout's Honor... by Way of Blood
- 1. "Wild for da Night" Released: 1996; 2. "Take It to the Streets" Released: July 1, 1997; 3. "We Getz Down" Released: 1997

Professional ratings
Review scores
Source	Rating
AllMusic	3/5 stars
The Source	3/5 stars

Scout's Honor... by Way of Blood is the debut solo studio album by American rapper Rampage. It was released on July 29, 1997, through Flipmode/Elektra Records. Production was mainly handled by DJ Scratch and Rashad Smith. It features guest appearances from Busta Rhymes, Spliff Star and Billy Lawrence among others. The album was a modest success, peaking at #65 on the Billboard 200 and #15 on the Top R&B/Hip-Hop Albums, and featuring two hit singles "Take It to the Streets" and "We Getz Down", which made it to #5 and #19 on the Hot Rap Singles.

== Track listing ==
Credits adapted from the album's liner notes.

No.	Title	Writer(s)	Producer(s)	Length
1.	"Intro"	Roger McNair	Rampage; DJ Scratch	2:09
2.	"Flipmode Iz da Squad" (featuring da Flipmode Squad)	McNair; Cleveland Delaney Jr.; William Lewis; Trevor Smith; Wayne Notise; David Axelrod	DJ Scratch	6:41
3.	"Da Night B4 My Shit Drop"	McNair; Smith; Rashad Smith	Rashad Smith	4:44
4.	"Talk of the Town"	McNair; George Spivey	DJ Scratch	6:02
5.	"Get the Money and Dip" (featuring Busta Rhymes)	McNair; Smith; Spivey	DJ Scratch	2:57
6.	"The Set Up"	McNair; Smith	Rashad Smith	4:11
7.	"Wild for da Night" (featuring Busta Rhymes)	McNair; Smith; Marlon King	The Vibe Chemist Backspin	5:14
8.	"Flipmode Enemy #1" (featuring Serious)	McNair; Spivey; Carlton Ridenhour; Hank Shocklee	DJ Scratch	5:38
9.	"Take It to the Streets" (featuring Billy Lawrence)	McNair; Billy Lawrence; Smith; Armando Colon; Galen Underwood; Bert Reid	Rashad Smith; Armando Colon^{[a]}	4:00
10.	"Conquer da World" (featuring Meka)	McNair; Spivey; Joseph Sample; Eric Barrier; William Griffin	DJ Scratch	4:36
11.	"Hall of Fame"	McNair; Spivey	DJ Scratch	3:01
12.	"Niggaz Iz Bad" (featuring Serious)	McNair; Delaney Jr.; Spivey	Rashad Smith	3:17
13.	"We Getz Down (Remix)"	McNair; Teddy Riley; Larry Blackmon; Nathan Leftenant; Charlie Singleton; Thomas Jenkins	Teddy Riley; Sprague "Doogie" Williams^{[a]}	4:15
14.	"Rampage Outro"	McNair	DJ Scratch	1:47
Total length:				50:39

=== Notes ===
- ^{^[a]} signifies a co-producer

== Samples ==
- "Intro"
  - "Woman" by Neneh Cherry
- "Flipmode Iz da Squad"
  - "General Confessional" by The Electric Prunes
- "We Getz Down"
  - "She's Strange" by Cameo
- "Wild for Da Night"
  - "American Fruit, African Roots" by Zulema
- "Take It To The Streets"
  - "Blow Your Head" by Fred Wesley & the J.B.'s
  - "I Hear Music In The Streets" by Unlimited Touch
- "Flipmode Enemy #1"
  - "Public Enemy #1" by Public Enemy

== Charts ==
Chart (1997)	Peak position
US Billboard 200	65
US Top R&B/Hip-Hop Albums (Billboard)	15
