= The Conglomerate Entertainment =

Record label founded by Busta Rhymes

Flipmode Records/The Conglomerate Entertainment
- Founded: 1994 (as Flipmode); 2010 (as Conglomerate)
- Founder: Busta Rhymes
- Distributor: J Records (2001—2004)
- Genre: Hip hop
- Country of origin: United States

The Conglomerate Entertainment (or Flipmode Records) is a record label founded by Busta Rhymes. The label was established in 1994 as Flipmode Records, and the name Conglomerate was later adopted in 2010.

== Company history ==
=== The Elektra era (1996–2000) ===
Dallas Austin helped Rhymes land a production deal and create the logo for the label. Before launching his solo career, Busta Rhymes was a member of the group Leaders of the New School, which was signed to Elektra Records. After the group disbanded due to Busta's rising popularity, he signed with Elektra as a solo artist under the leadership of Sylvia Rhone. The label later granted him his own imprint, which he launched as Flipmode Records. At the time, his new artist Rah Digga signed to Elektra, along with his cousin Rampage. Elektra would allow Busta to sign these acts to his Flipmode Records. Under the terms of the deal, Busta was responsible for putting their albums together and they would fund, promote and distribute the releases from the label.

The first release from Flipmode was Busta Rhymes' The Coming, which came in 1996, during the time that the east coast was beginning to gain popularity again after the rise of the west coast. The album went platinum and catapulted him and the label into stardom, it also featured appearances from coming Flipmode members Spliff Star, Lord Have Mercy, and Rampage. Rampage would release his debut album in 1997, along with Busta Rhymes' second album. The crew was forming all the while Rampage, Rah Digga, Busta, Spliff Star, and Lord Have Mercy would soon be joined by Baby Sham, as well. The label soon released an album by Flipmode Squad, The Imperial in 1998. By 1999, the group and label were one of the most popular crews in hip hop, with Busta Rhymes as their central star and leader. In mid-November 2000, following the release of Anarchy, Busta began looking for a way to move him and Flipmode to another label, but had only released four out of the five albums in his deal with Elektra. Busta began to express disappointment in Elektra after Anarchy failed to match the commercial performance of his previous albums. He subsequently began talks with Clive Davis's newly formed J Records and Def Jam. So, in 2000, he released a compilation album and began to search for a new home. By then, member Lord Have Mercy would part ways with the crew, signaling the end of the height of Flipmode as a crew, as his album The Ungodly Hour never saw the light of day. Future changes would plague the group due to tense chemistry with Busta.

=== The J era (2001–2004) ===
In February 2001, Busta Rhymes signed with J Records under the leadership of Clive Davis, bringing with him his Flipmode imprint, along with Flipmode artists Rah Digga and Flipmode Squad, to the label. That November, Busta Rhymes released his fifth studio album, Genesis. It featured production from Dr. Dre, and it started the professional relationship between the two. The album sold well, fueled by the P. Diddy-collaborated "Pass the Courvoisier." The single was a big hit during the year of 2002 and introduced Busta Rhymes into a younger generation of fans and revitalized his career. After the hype surrounding Genesis died down, Busta began working on an album for his Flipmode Squad, Rah Digga, and himself. The first to be released was It Ain't Safe No More, which featured Mariah Carey and the Flipmode Squad. Two singles from the album got a lot of airplay, but his new solo album stalled at gold.

In February 2004, reports emerged that Busta Rhymes had departed J Records and was preparing to sign with Dr. Dre's Aftermath Entertainment. According to Busta's manager, Chris Lighty, the agreement was effectively complete, although paperwork had not yet been finalized. Lighty cited the longstanding professional relationship and mutual respect between Busta Rhymes and Dr. Dre as factors in the move. The signing followed the commercial performance of Busta Rhymes' album It Ain't Safe No More... (2002), which was his final release for J Records. Busta's first Aftermath project was initially projected for release later in 2004. The following month, Rah Digga followed Busta in departing J following repeated delays to her sophomore album, Everything Is a Story. She stated that the prolonged setbacks surrounding the project convinced her that additional problems were likely and that, after waiting four years to release a follow-up to Dirty Harriet (2000), she could no longer afford to remain in that situation. Despite leaving the label, Digga said the album was complete and that she was negotiating with a new record company for its release. She also reaffirmed her loyalty to Busta Rhymes and Flipmode Squad, whose members were expected to appear on the album.

Flipmode resurfaced in 2005, when Busta Rhymes announced that he was planning to leave J Records and was recording his seventh album. Consequently, a new Flipmode album, though in the works, was shelved, and the roster continued to change.

=== Aftermath and Interscope (2006–2008) ===
In late 2005, Busta Rhymes had moved Flipmode once again, this time to Dr. Dre's Aftermath Entertainment, a subsidiary of powerhouse label, Interscope Records. He celebrated the new distribution deal by cutting off his trademark dreadlocks and signing Chauncey Black, formerly of Blackstreet. The deal came as no surprise to any hip hop fan as Dr. Dre had been producing for Busta since he had been signed to Elektra and he had begun to be featured on many Shady/Aftermath projects during the years 2003 and 2004. In February 2006, he released the second single, "I Love My Chick" from his seventh studio album The Big Bang. The album was released on June 13, 2006. It was a platinum success and returned the label back to the radio and back to hip hop prominence after a four-year absence. This success would be short-lived as the label's next release, Have You Seen? by Rampage failed to certify on the charts.

In March 2007, Rah Digga announced her departure from Flipmode after nearly a decade with the collective and label. She explained that, despite years of mixtape appearances, she had been unable to release a follow-up to her 2000 debut album Dirty Harriet and felt it was time to pursue other opportunities. Digga stated that Flipmode members had increasingly focused on individual careers rather than functioning as a unified group, while also citing frustrations stemming from delays surrounding her unreleased sophomore album at J Records. She emphasized that her departure was not due to personal animosity and continued to pursue both music and acting projects afterward.

On July 17, 2008, Busta Rhymes got dropped from Interscope/Aftermath, however. It was reported that Busta Rhymes was dropped from Interscope due to a heated argument with Jimmy Iovine. It was later revealed that following his alleged acrimonious departure from the Interscope/Aftermath label he signed a new deal with Universal Motown, who would be releasing his 8th studio album Back on My B.S. on May 19, 2009.

=== Universal Motown and Conglomerate (2008–2009) ===
Smith released his eighth studio album Back on My B.S. on May 19, 2009, via Universal Motown. The album debuted at No. 5 on the Billboard 200, selling 56,000 copies, and was his first album to not receive an RIAA certification, selling 122,000 copies to date. The singles that have been released from the album are, "Arab Money", "Hustler's Anthem '09" and "Respect My Conglomerate". The song "World Go Round", featuring British singer Estelle, was released in France on April 6, 2009, due to the heavy rotation of a leaked version. The single was released in the UK on July 13, 2009. All the while, the Flipmode roster continued to change, and Spliff Star dropped a number of street albums, with the collective recording mixtapes.

Busta Rhymes then founded The Conglomerate Entertainment in 2010 and the brand is no longer known as Flipmode.

=== Conglomerate (2010–present) ===
On November 16, 2011, it was announced that Busta Rhymes signed with Cash Money Records. For his debut single on the label and his The Conglomerate Entertainment, "Why Stop Now", he reunited with his "Look at Me Now"-collaborator Chris Brown.

The Conglomerate, as a collective effort, released its first official mixtape, Catastrophic, at the end of 2012. On July 24, 2014, Reek da Villian revealed that he had departed from Conglomerate Records.

== In-house personnel ==
=== Current ===
- Busta Rhymes – chief executive officer (CEO) and founder

== Artists ==
=== Current acts ===
- Busta Rhymes
- Spliff Star
- Meka
- J-Doe
- O.T. Genasis
- Murda Mook
- Prayah
- Trillian

=== Former acts ===
- Lord Have Mercy
- Roc Marciano
- Rah Digga
- Baby Sham
- Rampage
- Chauncey Black
- Flipmode Squad
- Labba
- Show Money
- Jelly Roll
- Reek da Villian
- N.O.R.E.
- M.Dollars
- Stove God Cooks
- Serious

== Discography ==
Artist	Album	Details
Busta Rhymes	The Coming (released with Elektra)	Released: March 26, 1996; Chart position: 6 U.S.; RIAA certification: Platinum
Rampage	Scout's Honor… by Way of Blood (released with Elektra)	Released: July 29, 1997; Chart position: #65 U.S.; RIAA certification: Gold
Busta Rhymes	When Disaster Strikes... (released with Elektra)	Released: September 23, 1997; Chart position: 3 U.S.; RIAA certification: Platinum
Flipmode Squad	The Imperial (released with Elektra)	Released: September 1, 1998; Chart position: 15 U.S.; RIAA certification: Gold
Busta Rhymes	E.L.E.: The Final World Front (released with Elektra)	Released: December 8, 1998; Chart position: 12 U.S.; RIAA certification: Platinum
Rah Digga	Dirty Harriet (released with Elektra)	Released: November 2, 1999; Chart position: 18 U.S.; RIAA certification: Gold
Busta Rhymes	Anarchy (released with Elektra)	Released: June 20, 2000; Chart position: 4 U.S.; RIAA certification: Platinum
Busta Rhymes	Total Devastation (released with Elektra)	Released: October 2, 2001; Chart position: –
Busta Rhymes	Genesis (released with J)	Released: November 27, 2001; Chart position: 7 U.S.; RIAA certification: Platinum
Busta Rhymes	It Ain't Safe No More... (released with J)	Released: November 26, 2002; Chart position: 43 U.S.; RIAA certification: Gold
Rampage	Have You Seen? (released with Deep Freeze and Sure Shot)	Released: June 6, 2006; Chart position: –
Busta Rhymes	The Big Bang (released with Aftermath and Interscope)	Released: June 13, 2006; Chart position: 1 U.S.; RIAA certification: Gold
Spliff Star	Contraband (released with Paperrock)	Released: January 22, 2008; Chart position: –
Busta Rhymes	Back on My B.S. (released with Universal Motown)	Released: May 5, 2009; Chart position: 5 U.S.
Busta Rhymes	Year of the Dragon (released with Google Play)	Released: August 21, 2012; Chart position: –
Conglomerate	Catastrophic	Released: December 21, 2012; Chart position: –
OT Genasis	Rhythm & Bricks (released with The Conglomerate Records)	Released: September 22, 2015; Chart Positions: -

== See also ==
- List of record labels
