= Flipmode Squad =

American hip-hop collective

- Origin: New York City, U.S.
- Genre: Hip-hop
- Years active: 1993–2012; 2024–present
- Labels: Flipmode; Elektra; J; Conglomerate
- Members: Busta Rhymes; Rah Digga; Spliff Star
- Past members: Baby Sham; Chauncey Black; DJ Ice Cold; DJ Scratch; J-Doe; Labba; Lord Have Mercy; M. Dollars; Meka; Nikki Grier; N.O.R.E. Papoose; Rampage; Reek Da Villian; Roc Marciano; Seige Monstracity; Serious; Show Money

Flipmode Squad is an American hip-hop collective formed and fronted by Busta Rhymes.

== History ==
In 1993, Busta Rhymes first introduced the Flipmode Squad when he still was a part of former group Leaders of the New School, with the members being Brittle Lo and Cool Whip of the duo Cracker Jacks, Rampage the Last Boy Scout and Boy Wonder the Caped Crusader. The lineup changed up drastically with Rampage being the only remaining member of Flipmode.

The first Flipmode album debuted in 1998 with The Imperial, Rampage and Rah Digga went on to record solo efforts. In the move to J Records in 2000, Lord Have Mercy left Flipmode Squad in preference of a solo career in 2000, feeling that Busta Rhymes was holding him down. The original lineup also included Serious, who after quickly leaving would later produce for artists on No Limit Records, and later acts like Show Money and M. Dollars who were signed to the label as independent artists. Underground MC Roc Marciano would also be signed to the label for a number of years before going the independent route.

A second Flipmode Squad release, Rulership Movement, was set for release in 2003 on J Records, but because of the label change to Aftermath it was never released. It was announced that the album might be released sometime in 2009. J-MOE was in the group until he went solo. The founding member, Busta Rhymes later joined Dr. Dre's Aftermath label in 2006, and Rah Digga & Spliff Star appeared alongside Busta in the "Touch It (Remix)" video.

In March 2007, Rah Digga announced her departure from Flipmode Squad after over a decade with Flipmode. She explained that, despite years of mixtapes and guest appearances, she had been unable to release a follow-up to her 2000 debut album Dirty Harriet and felt it was time to pursue other opportunities. Digga stated that Flipmode members had increasingly focused on individual careers rather than the group, while also citing frustrations stemming from delays surrounding her shelved sophomore album at J. She emphasized that she had no hard feelings with any of the members. That November, Rah Digga denied reports that she was reuniting with Flipmode Squad following rumors circulating that Rampage, Rah Digga, Baby Sham, and Spliff Star had formed a new group under the name Famous Millionaire Squad (FMS), with Busta Rhymes being “ousted” from the group. Rah Digga rejected the rumors, stating that she was not involved in any such reunion or renamed group and had no immediate plans to rejoin Flipmode Squad. She clarified that while she maintained positive feelings toward her former group members and would consider future collaborations under the right circumstances, the claims regarding a new group formation and Busta Rhymes’ removal were inaccurate.

Spliff Star continued to collaborate in forming the Conglomerate with Busta, along with founding his own label. DJ Scratch left Flipmode/The Conglomerate in 2009 but returned in 2011 with the new movement taking form. Reek da Villian left Flipmode in 2009, but because of business reasons, he then headed to the Conglomerate, as well. Various members continued to record with each other. Busta signed with Cash Money Records in 2011, taking his business there with him. As the Conglomerate, an official mixtape was released in 2012.

On March 14, 2024, Busta Rhymes announced on Instagram that the Flipmode Squad had reformed and would be releasing another album later in the year. As of March 2024, Rah Digga and Spliff Star were the only fully confirmed returning members other than Rhymes himself, and Rah was featured on a snippet of a song he released.

== Discography ==
=== Studio albums ===
- 1998: The Imperial

=== Mixtapes ===
- 2002: Arsenal for the Streets pt. 1
- 2003: Arsenal for the Streets pt. 2 (The Full Court Press)
- 2007: The Facelift pt. 1
- 2007: The Full Course Meal
- 2012: Catastrophic (as newly formed Conglomerate)

=== Singles ===
- 1998: "Everybody on the Line Outside"
- 1998: "Run for Cover" (Promo)
- 1998: "Cha Cha Cha"
- 1999: "Rastaman Chant" (Bob Marley featuring Flipmode Squad) (from the album Chant Down Babylon)
- 2002: "Here We Go"
- 2003: "I Know What You Want" (Busta Rhymes featuring Mariah Carey & Flipmode Squad) (from the album It Ain't Safe No More)

=== Other appearances ===
- 1997: "Flipmode Iz da Squad". [Scout's Honor... by Way of Blood]
- 1997: "There's Not a Problem My Squad Can't Fix!" [When Disaster Strikes...]
- 1998: "Freestyle". [The Mix Tape, Vol. III]
- 1998: "Take a Walk in My Shoes". [Slam (soundtrack)]
- 1998: "Against All Odds". [Extinction Level Event: The Final World Front]
- 1998: "Whatever You Want". [The Professional]
- 1999: "Watcha Come Around Here For?" [Violator: The Album]
- 2000: "Come Get It". [Don't Sleep]
- 2000: "Just for You". [Dirty Harriet]
- 2000: "Set It on Fire". [The Piece Maker]
- 2000: "Let's Make a Toast". [Now or Never: Odyssey 2000]
- 2000: "Here We Go Again". [Anarchy]'
- 2001: "Take That". [Brace 4 Impak]
- 2001: "What It Is Pt. 2". [Dr. Dolittle 2 (soundtrack)]
- 2001: "Match the Name with the Voice". [Genesis]
- 2002: "Just Chill". [Friday After Next (soundtrack)]
- 2003: "Angels Voice". [The Streetsweeper, Vol. 1]
- 2009: "We Want In". [Back on My B.S.]
- 2020: "Follow the Wave". [Extinction Level Event 2: The Wrath of God]

== Members ==
Busta Rhymes
Rampage
Brittle Lo
Cool Whip
^{[a]}
Lord Have Mercy
Spliff Star
Baby Sham
Rah Digga
Serious
Meka
Roc Marciano
│
1993
│
1994
│
1995
│
1996
│
1997
│
1998
│
1999
│
2000
│
2001
│
2002
│
2003
│
2004
│
2005
│
2006
│
2007
│
2008
│
2009
│
2010
│
2011
Band members and studio albums

in chronological order

- Busta Rhymes (1993–2011, 2024-present)
- Rampage (1993–2006)
- Brittle Lo (1993–1994)
- Cool Whip (1993–1994)
- Boy Wonder the Caped Crusader (1993–1994)
- Lord Have Mercy (1996–2000)
- Spliff Star (1996–2011)
- Blacko (1996)
- Bolo (1996)
- Puzzle (1996)
- Big-Gee (1996)
- True 2 Life (1996)
- Mika (1996)
- DJ Scratch (1996–2009, 2011–2014)
- Rah Digga (1997–2007, 2024-present)
- Baby Sham (1997–2008)
- Serious (1997–1998)
- Meka (1997–2003)
- Brady Lanter (1998–2014)
- Roc Marciano (1999–2001)
- M. Dollars (2003–2007)
- Labba (2003–2007)
- Chauncey Black (2004–2009)
- Reek Da Villian (2006–2009; 2011–2014)
- Papoose (2006–2008)
- J-Doe (2008–2014)
- Seige Monstracity (2009–2014)
- DJ Ice Cold (2009–2014)
- Lonny Bereal (2010–2014)
- Nikki Grier (2010–2014)
- N.O.R.E. (2011–2014)
- Dready (2007-2014)

== Notes ==
^{a} artist name: Boy Wonder the Caped Crusader
