= Vigeland =

Vigeland may refer to:

== Places ==
- Vigeland, Norway, the administrative centre of Lindesnes municipality in Vest-Agder, Norway
- Vigeland installation, a complex of sculptures inside Frogner Park in Oslo, Norway
- Vigeland Museum, a museum in Oslo, Norway

== People ==
- Carl Vigeland (born 1947), American writer and lecturer
- Daniel Vigeland (1847–1927), Norwegian farmer and politician for the Liberal Party
- Emanuel Vigeland (1875–1948), Norwegian artist
- Emma Vigeland (born 1994), American progressive political commentator
- Gustav Vigeland (1869–1943), Norwegian sculptor
- Maria Vigeland (1903–1983), Norwegian painter and sculptor
- Tone Vigeland (1938–2024), Norwegian gold/silversmith and jewelry designer
- Nils Vigeland (born 1950), American composer and pianist
