= Fløistad =

Fløistad is a surname. Notable people with the surname include:

- Guttorm Fløistad (1878–1953), Norwegian farmer, bailiff, and politician
- Guttorm Fløistad (born 1930), Norwegian philosopher
- Ivar Fløistad (1846–1926), Norwegian bailiff and politician
