= Rah Digga discography =

This page lists the discography of Rah Digga.

== Albums ==
=== Studio albums ===
List of studio albums, with selected chart positions
Title	Album details	Peak chart positions			Sales
Title	Album details	US	US R&B /HH	UK R&B	Sales
Dirty Harriet	Released: April 4, 2000; Label: Flipmode/Elektra; Formats: CD, LP, cassette, digital download, streaming	18	3	26	US: 311,000
Classic	Released: September 14, 2010; Label: RED/Raw Koncept; Formats: CD, digital download, streaming	—	83	—	
"—" denotes a recording that did not chart or was not released in that territory.

=== Unreleased albums ===
- Everything Is a Story (2004)

=== Mixtapes ===
List of mixtapes, with year released
Title	Mixtape details
The Wrong Bitch To Fuck Wit! (with DJ Whoo Kid)	Released: 2003; Label: Flipmode; Formats: CD
The Wrong Bitch To Fuck Wit! Vol.2 (with DJ Enuff)	Released: 2003; Label: Flipmode; Formats: CD
Queen Of The Damned (with DJ L)	Released: 2004; Label: Open Lock Entertainment; Formats: CD
A Prelude to a Classic	Released: February 24, 2010; Label: Raw Koncept; Formats: Digital download
The Soundcloud Files	Released: 2022; Label: Self-released; Formats: CD

=== Group albums ===
List of group albums, with selected chart positions and certifications
Title	Album details	Peak chart positions				Certifications
Title	Album details	US	US R&B/ HH	UK	UK R&B	Certifications
The Imperial (as part of Flipmode Squad)	Released: September 1, 1998; Label: Elektra; Formats: CD, LP, Cassette, digital download	15	3	85	10	RIAA: Gold

== Singles ==
=== As lead artist ===
List of singles, with selected chart positions, showing year released and album name
Title	Year	Peak chart positions		Album
Title	Year	US R&B	US Rap	Album
"Tight"	2000	—	—	Dirty Harriet
"Imperial" (featuring Busta Rhymes)	2000	59	16	Dirty Harriet
"Break Fool"	2000	61	15	Dirty Harriet
"Words"	2002	—	—	Non-album singles
"Party & Bullshit 2003"	2003	65	—	The Wrong Bitch To Fuck Wit!
"Make It Hot" (featuring The Game)	2005	—	—	Club Crushers
"Life Is a Movie"	2008	—	—	The Music Box
"Day At The Range"	2009	—	—	Non-album single
"New Shit"	2010	—	—	Non-album single
"Warning Shots"	2010	—	—	Classic
"Look What You Done Started"	2010	—	—	Classic
"Made MC"	2011	—	—	We on Some Rich Kidd Shit Vol. 5: Born to Win
"And Another One" (featuring Rapsody)	2013	—	—	Non-album single
"Art Imitates Life" (with Talib Kweli and Black Thought)	2013	—	—	Non-album single
"Storm Comin" (featuring Chuck D)	2014	—	—	Non-album singles
"Angela Davis"	2014	—	—	Non-album singles
"—" denotes a recording that did not chart or was not released in that territory.

== Guest appearances ==
List of guest appearances, with other performing artists, showing year released and album name
Title	Year	Other performer(s)	Album	
"Cowboys"	1996	Fugees, Pacewon, Young Zee	The Score	
"Juice"	1996	Young Zee	Musical Meltdown	
"Don't Let Go Love (2000 Watts Remix)"	1996	En Vogue	Non-album single	
"Mardi Gras at Midnight"	1997	A Tribe Called Quest	The Jam EP	
"Be OK"	1998	Bahamadia	Lyricist Lounge, Volume One	
"Thinkin' Bout It (Remix)"	1998	Gerald Levert	Non-album single	
"Six-Pack"	1998	Heather B., Nikki D, Bahamadia, Paula Perry, Precious P	—N/a	
"Whatever You Want"	1998	DJ Clue?, Flipmode Squad	The Professional	
"Watcha Come Around Here For?"	1999	Flipmode Squadron	Violator: The Album	
"Come Get It"	1999	DJ Hurricane, Flipmode Squadron	Whiteboys (soundtrack)/Don't Sleep	
"Whoa! (Remix)"	2000	Black Rob, Beanie Sigel, Da Brat, Lil' Cease, G-Dep	—N/a	
"One Four Love Pt. 1"	2000	Kool G Rap, Common, Talib Kweli, Mos Def, Pharoahe Monch, Posdnuos, Shabaam Sahdeeq, Sporty Thievz	Hip Hop for Respect	
"Feel Me"	2000	Rampage, Rock	Scary Movie (soundtrack)	
"Set It on Fire"	2000	Tony Touch, Flipmode Squad	The Piece Maker	
"Down for the Count"	2000	Talib Kweli, Xzibit	Train of Thought	
"Fuck Y'all Niggaz"	2000	Outsidaz	Night Life EP	
"You Don't Know Me Like That (Remix)"	2000	Damozel	—N/a	
"Lights Out"	2000	Mastermind, Kardinal Offishall	Volume 50: Street Legal	
"Getting It"	2001	DJ Clue?, Busta Rhymes	The Professional 2	
"State vs. Kirk Jones"	2001	Sticky Fingaz, Canibus, Superb, Redman, Scarred 4 Life, Guess Who	Black Trash: The Autobiography of Kirk Jones	
"Type I Hate"	2001	Masta Ace, Leschea	Disposable Arts	
"What It Is Pt. 2"	2001	Flipmode Squad, Kelis	Dr. Dolittle 2 (OST)	
"I'm Leavin'"	2001	Outsidaz, Kelis	The Bricks	
"Betta Stay Up in Your House"	2001	Busta Rhymes	Genesis	
"Can't Get Enough"	2001	Spliff Star, Meka	Violator: The Album, V2.0	
"Put a Cut on It"	2002	Aphrodite	Aftershock	
"Just Chill"	2002	Flipmode Squad, Busta Rhymes, Spliff Star	Friday After Next (soundtrack)	
"Tell Me"	2002	Erick Sermon, MC Lyte	React	
"I Know What You Want"	2002	Busta Rhymes, Flipmode Squad, Mariah Carey	It Ain't Safe No More...	
"Together"	2002	Busta Rhymes	It Ain't Safe No More...	
"Gangsta Queens"	2002	Trina, Groove Armada	Blade II (soundtrack)	
"Throw Your Shit Up"	2003	DJ Envy, Busta Rhymes	The Desert Storm Mixtape: Blok Party, Vol. 1	
"Bout"	2003	Jamelia	Thank You	
"Next Generation"	2003	Wyclef Jean, Scarface	The Preacher's Son	
"Jealousy"	2005	Bless	The Book of Bless	
"Touch It" (Remix)	2006	Busta Rhymes, Papoose, Lloyd Banks, DMX, Mary J. Blige, Missy Elliott	—N/a	
"Official Jersey Miss"	2006	Miss Nana	I Got the Hood	
"Stand Down"	2006	Miri Ben-Ari, Young Zee	The Pulling Strings Mixtape	
"Gimme Dat"	2007	Tommy Tee, Young Zee, Stat Quo	Feelin' It EP	
"Sexual Healing"	2008	Akay	Comfort Zone	
"America"	2008	Cornel West, Bmwmb, Black Thought, Iriz, L. Witherspoon	Never Forget: A Journey of Revelations	
"What They Call Me"	2008	Pete Rock	Pete Rock vs. The Machines	
"Life Is a Movie"	2008	Strange Fruit Project	Presents S1: Music Box	
"Up in Here"	2009	Lil Scrappy, Charon Don	Best of Good Hands	
"Girl Samurai Lullaby"	2009	RZA, Stone Mecca	The RZA Presents: Afro Samurai Resurrection OST	
"Bitch Gonna Get Ya"	2009	RZA	The RZA Presents: Afro Samurai Resurrection OST	
"Cars" (Remix)	2010	Nottz	—N/a	
"Win"	2010	Rapsody	Return of the B-Girl	
"The BBQ"	2011	Eternia, MoSS, The Lady of Rage	At Last	
"We Don't Care"	2011	Nycest Emcee	Arrival N Departure	
"Everyday In The Street (Illmind Remix)	2011	2012	El Da Sensei, Tame One	The Nu World Remix EP
"G Spot"	Phil Blount	2012	Mr. New Haven	
"Moon, Stars & Sun"	Evitan, Bootsy Collins	2012	Speed of Life	
"Art Imitates Life"	2013	Talib Kweli, Black Thought	Gravitas	
"Ladies First Freestyle"	2013	Tony Touch, Angie Martinez	The Piece Maker 3: Return of the 50 MC's	
"Let 'Em Know"	2013	DJ Skizz, Shabaam Sahdeeq, Tragedy Khadafi	B.Q.E. (Brooklyn-Queens Experience)	
"Industry Girls"	2013	Motley	Deal or No Deal	
"Earrings Off"	2013	Marco Polo	PA2: The Director's Cut	
"Sumthin'"	2013	Da Beatminerz, Tash	Sumthin' EP	
"Black Hoodie Rap"	2015	Maticulous, Lil' Fame	The Maticulous LP	
"Riot Control"	2015	Taiyamo Denku, Gavlyn, Perseph One	RadiOctave	
"Say Nothing"	2016	Koolade, Sean Price, Tony Touch	—N/a	
"Duck Duck Goose"	2017	JR & PH7, St. Joe Louis	Coral Cadavers	
"Wild 4 da Nite"	2017	DJ Derezon, Billy Danze	—N/a	
"Ruff and Tuff"	2017	Venom	—N/a	
"One Rhyme to the Next"	2018	Rock Mecca, Ras Kass	—N/a	
"Doomsday Preppers"	2019	Planet Asia	Initials on my Jewelry	
