= Live from the Streets =

Music and Video project by Mr. Green and Sam Lipman-Stern

Live From The Streets

Compilation album by Mr. Green
- Released: April 7, 2015
- Genre: Hip hop, Documentary
- Length: 45:48
- Label: Duck Down Music; Live From The Streets Productions
- Director: Sam Lipman-Stern (also exec.); Sam Lipman-Stern (exec.)
- Producer: Mr. Green (also exec.); Sam Lipman-Stern (exec.)

Mr. Green chronology
Unpredictable (2015)	Live From The Streets (2015)	FLYGOD is good... all the time (Westside Gunn) (2018)

Live From The Streets is a video production company, television series and record label by American producer Mr. Green and filmmaker Sam Lipman-Stern. The company is known for having a series on VICE as well as going viral on the TikTok app via the song “If I don't go to Hell”. A new version was released in 2021 and reached the top 40 charts. The original Live from the Streets album began charting again in 2021 in several countries and reached #1 on iTunes.

== Background ==
Live from the Streets started as a video series created by producer Mr. Green and director Sam Lipman-Stern most known for airing on VICE's music channel Noisey and Green Label. The series, follows Green globally on a journey meeting interesting people and musicians on the streets. Green samples their music; interviews the street performer; and then turns the sounds into original beats. After the beat is created, he collaborates with a rapper or singer to add powerful lyrics to the musical backdrop he and the street musician constructed. Finally, at the end of each episode, Green revisits the people he sampled to play them the final track; oftentimes receiving emotional responses from people who have never heard themselves on recorded audio. The final episodes are a unique hybrid music/video experience. Mr. Green has compiled the songs from the series into an album, and released 'Live From The Streets' on April 7, 2015, via Duck Down Music Inc. and their own production company. On December 1, 2021, a new "If I Don't Go To Hell 3022" EP was released featuring KRS-One and Trippie Redd along with an intro by Ghostface Killah. The EP reached the top 40 on iTunes.

== Track listing ==
All tracks produced by Mr. Green

No.	Title	Length
1.	"Man With A Broken Heart" (featuring Brenda & Malik B.)	3:28
2.	"If I Don't Go To Hell" (featuring Janice, Pacewon & Vinnie Paz)	3:46
3.	"Down In The Streets" (featuring Kevin Brown, Malik B. & Sunwun)	3:16
4.	"I Believe" (featuring Country, Pacewon & Skrewtape)	2:09
5.	"Clap" (featuring Espiritu Andino, Freddie Gibbs, Chill Moody & Apollo The Great)	3:34
6.	"East Coast Gas Station" (featuring Slaughter Rico)	1:27
7.	"Human In Disguise" (featuring Matisyahu, Kyon Williams & Benefit)	2:50
8.	"Cans" (featuring Don Felipe Cantando & Deniro Farrar)	1:37
9.	"Play The Back" (featuring Pitch Blak Brass Band & World's Fair)	2:30
10.	"Superpowers" (featuring Hakim Green, KRS-One & Mario Levis)	3:36
11.	"Toronto" (featuring Rich Kidd, Tre Mission, DeVah Quartet & Khari Wendell McClelland)	2:58
12.	"If I Don't Go To Hell Remix" (featuring Janice, Benefit & Jus Allah)	3:35
13.	"Born To Be King" (featuring KG)	3:56
14.	"Step Into The Booth (Bonus)" (featuring Raz Fresco & Andrea M. Pacheco)	1:46
15.	"New Jack City Is Mine (Bonus)" (featuring Lumin Hao & Bodega Bamz)	2:00
16.	"The Original (Bonus)" (featuring Benefit)	3:20
Total length:		45:48

== Personnel ==
Adoated from Discogs and Allmusic

- Apollo The Great - featured artist
- Benefit - featured artist
- Bodega Bamz - featured artist
- Chill Moody - featured artist
- Chris Conway - mixing (tracks: 3, 4, 5, 8)
- Deniro Farrar - featured artist
- Dru Ha - management
- Freddie Gibbs - featured artist
- Hakim Green - featured artist
- James Niche - artwork, management
- KG - featured artist
- KRS-One - featured artist
- Malik B. - featured artist
- Matisyahu - featured artist
- Mr. Green - primary artist, executive producer, mixing (tracks: 1, 2, 6, 7, 9–14, 16)
- Noah Friedman - management
- Ohla - mixing (track 15)
- Pacewon - featured artist
- Raz Fresco - featured artist
- Rich Kidd - featured artist
- Sam Lipman-Stern - executive producer
- Slaughter Rico - featured artist
- Tre Mission - featured artist
- Vinnie Paz - featured artist
- World's Fair - featured artist
