= Outsidaz =

American hip hop collective

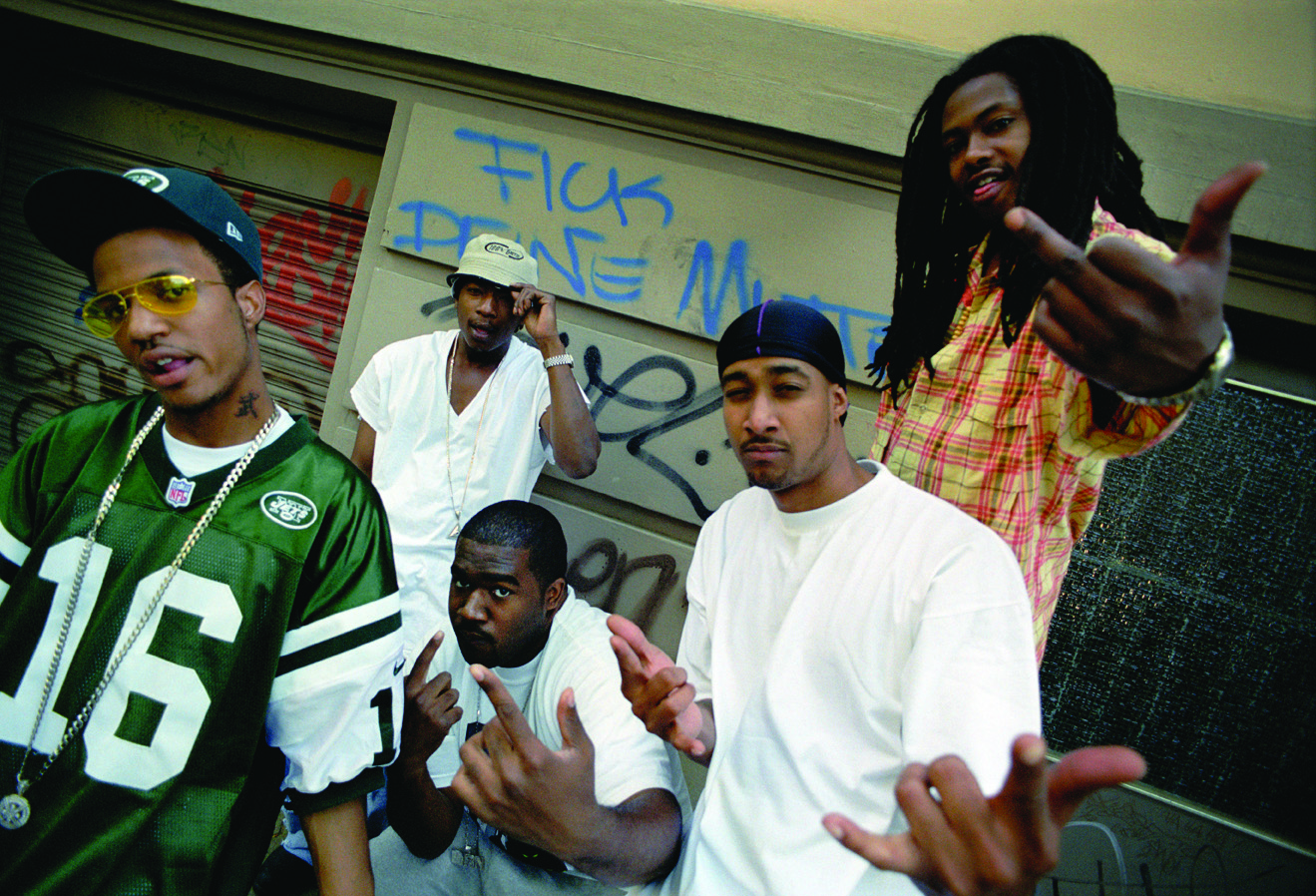
- Outsidaz in 2001

Background information
- Also known as: Da Outsidaz; The Outsidaz
- Origin: Newark, New Jersey, U.S.
- Genres: East Coast hip-hop; hardcore hip-hop; battle rap
- Years active: 1991–2003; 2012–2021 (reunion)
- Labels: Ruffhouse; Columbia
- Past members: Axe; Az Izz; Bskills; Bugz; Bizarre; D.U.; Denzy; DJ Muhammed; DJ Spunk; Eminem; Loon One; Nawshis; Pace Won; Rah Digga; S.Coop; Slang Ton; Yah Yah; Young Zee

The Outsidaz were an American hip hop collective from Newark, New Jersey, perhaps best known through their affiliation and collaborations with fellow Tri-State area rap trio Fugees and Detroit-area rap group D12. Past members included Eminem, Rah Digga, and Pace Won among others. In 2001, members of the collective released their only studio album to date, The Bricks.

== History ==
The group formed in 1991 after underground rapper Young Zee (born Dewayne Battle) met D.U. (born Brian Bostic) and Pacewon (born Jerome Hinds) at a New Year's Eve party. At the time they met, Young Zee and Pacewon were rival MCs. Pacewon & D.U. were members of a crew named PNS, while Zee headed a crew named Pskitzo with members Anthony D. Ore (aka Maddfile) and Augustus C. Battle (aka A-Form). They decided to unite into one group called the Outsidaz, following a lengthy microphone battle that it was decided ended in a tie.

Along with Pacewon, D.U. and Young Zee, the Outsidaz consisted of Axe (born Tyree Smith), Denzy (born Denton Dawes), Loon One, DJ Spunk (born Aubrey Polk), S. Coop (born Larry Cooper), Nawshis (born Nathaniel Longchamp), Rah Digga (born Rashia Fisher), the late Slang Ton (real name Salih Ibn Al Bayyinah Scaife, died in 1999), Bskills and Yah Yah (born Shakir Nur-al-din Abdullah).

The Outsidaz are affiliated with the Refugee Camp, and made their first commercial appearance as guest artists on the song "Cowboys" off the Fugees multi-platinum second LP The Score. They were shouted at the end of the chart-topping single "Killing Me Softly". They were also affiliated with Detroit-based rap collective D12, collaborating with them on different projects. D12 member Eminem shouts out the Outsidaz at the end of the song "Just Don't Give a Fuck", in the beginning of "Cum On Everybody", and in the songs "As the World Turns" and "I'm Shady", all of which were released on his major-label solo debut The Slim Shady LP. He also acknowledges them in a track titled "Till Hell Freezes Over" which was intended to be on the album. A rift developed between Eminem and Tha Outsidaz when Young Zee and Pace Won each recorded verses alongside Bizarre for the 'Amityville' track on Eminem's major label sophomore, The Marshall Mathers LP. Dr. Dre complained that Eminem had too many guests on the album, so Pace Won and Young Zee's verses were removed from the track. In a 2015 interview, Pace Won indicated that the original version of the track was probably permanently erased, and as yet, this would appear to be the case, as it has not yet emerged from the vaults. Eminem's Shady Records label released Shady XV, a compilation album which featured a track titled, "Fine Line" by Eminem. On the song, he performs a verse showing his appreciation for the group (specifically Pacewon and Young Zee).

== Solo ventures ==
Pace Won appeared on Morcheeba's 2002 album, Charango. He appeared on the title track, in addition to "Get Along".

In 2008, Pacewon collaborated with New Jersey producer Mr. Green on The Only Color That Matters Is Green, which included the Eminem diss "The Joker". The first single was "Hip Hop". In 2009, Young Zee appeared on Chicago rappers Saurus and Bones' debut album, Mind Like Mine on the song "Let the Trumpets Blow".

In 2011, Young Zee and Pacewon appeared on the Jedi Mind Tricks album Violence Begets Violence on the song "Design in Malice". The following year, Pacewon and Mr. Green appeared on the song "Get at Me" from St. Cule's album, American Beef. That July, Young Zee and Mr. Green released a collaborative album titled "One Crazy Weekend" featured Pacewon, Rah Digga, Yah Yah, D.U., and Zee's son, Krash Battle.

In 2015, Pacewon and Denzy, along with DJ Scob, Ill Proceeja, S-Ka-Paid, and Thomas Wlodarczyk (Miilkbone), formed The Shady Corps, the Eminem tribute hip hop group, and released one studio album via Pace's Team Won Inc.

In 2018, Pacewon pre-released Outsidaz the Bricks (Slang Ton Tribute Edition) on the 19th anniversary of his death. It featured all other releases from all Outsidaz members.

== Discography ==
=== Albums ===
Year	Album	Chart Positions	
Year	Album	US Hip-Hop	US Heatseekers
2000	Night Life	67	19
2001	The Bricks	68	48

=== Compilation albums ===
2018: Outsidaz the Bricks (Slang Ton Tribute Edition)

=== Singles ===
- "Rain or Shine" (1998)
- "The Rah Rah" (1999)
- "Macosa/Do It with a Passion" (1999)
- "Keep On/Done in the Game" (2001)
- "Who U Be?" (2001)
- "Ya Can't" (2001)
- "Public Enemy #1" (2001)
- "I Want Her Out" (2001)
- "I'm Leavin'" (2002)
- D.U.-"Sour 'n' Juice" (feat. Pacewon & G-Smoke) (2012)
