= Musical Meltdown =

Studio album by Young Zee
- Released: 1996 (promo only); April 28, 2015 (commercial release)
- Recorded: 1995–1996
- Genre: East Coast hip hop; hardcore rap
- Length: 1:11:12
- Label: Perspective; Gentleman's Relief (re-issue)
- Producer: Ski; Feel Good Skills; KRS-One; Prestige; Kobie Brown; Twista; Beezo; Luqman; Roots; Q-Tip

Young Zee chronology
| Musical Meltdown (1996) | The Album I Had When I Was Supposed to Sign to Shady! (2009) |

Singles from Musical Meltdown
- 1. "Everybody Get" Released: 1995; 2. "Problems" Released: 1996

Musical Meltdown is the debut album of American rapper Young Zee. Originally released as a promotional cassette by Perspective Records in 1996, the album was not commercially released until April 28, 2015, when it was re-issued by independent label Gentleman's Relief Records. The CD format features full liner notes about the making and re-discovery of the album, while the cassette format is limited to 100 copies. It has been compared to other previously-shelved hip hop albums, such as Kamaal the Abstract by Q-Tip, Center of Attention by INI, and The Original Baby Pa by Deda.

The record featured production by Ski, Feel Good Skills, Prestige, Kobie Brown, KRS-One and Twista with appearances by Lauryn Hill, Busta Rhymes, KRS-One, and the Outsidaz. Q-Tip remixed "Everybody Get", Zee's first single for Perspective Records from 1995.

== Release ==
Musical Meltdown was released as an official limited promo cassette via Perspective Records. The Source gave this album only a 2 mic rating in its July 1996 issue. This is also referenced by Eminem on his song "As The World Turns" off his Slim Shady LP where he raps "Outsidaz and we suin' the courts, 'cause we dope as fuck and only get a two (mics) in The Source". Perspective was apparently unhappy with the sales of hip hop records by artists like Pudgee tha Phat Bastard anyway, and money was already becoming scarce in 1996. A negative review of the album, by the most respected hip hop magazine in the world at the time, might have been the final nail in the coffin for hip hop at the label. The record was shelved and never saw an official release until 2015, when Gentleman's Relief Records re-issued it.

== Reception ==
Professional ratings
Review scores
| Source | Rating |
|---|---|
| AllMusic | 3/5 stars |
| Rap Pages | 7/10 |
| RapReviews | 9.5/10 |
| The Source | 2/5 stars |

The album received generally favorable reviews from music critics. RapReviews gave it a 9.5/10 rating, stating "Young Zee's record is a true gem that should etch a permanent smile across the jaded faces of hip-hop enthusiasts of all ages," also praising its "classic New Jersey sound." Vibe gave it a favorable review, noting "Zee proves that compact beats and ingenious similes can still move a crowd." AllMusic gave the album 3 out of 5 stars, calling it "refreshing," and also stating "he delivers the goods — just don't expect something revolutionary."

== Track listing ==
| No. | Title | Producer(s) | Length |
|---|---|---|---|
| 1. | "Toxic Waste" (featuring Loon One) | Twista | 4:21 |
| 2. | "Don't Fuck with New Jersey" | Ski | 4:43 |
| 3. | "Problems" | Ski | 4:20 |
| 4. | "Tonsil Check" (featuring Yah Yah) | Feel Good Skills | 4:44 |
| 5. | "W-Outz" (Interlude) | Prestige | 4:01 |
| 6. | "Nerve Plucker" | Prestige | 4:26 |
| 7. | "Stay Gold" (featuring Lauryn Hill & Yah Yah) | Beezo; Luqman; Roots | 5:37 |
| 8. | "Crazy" (featuring KRS-One & Pacewon) | KRS-One | 3:12 |
| 9. | "Eazy Widaz" | Feel Good Skills | 4:35 |
| 10. | "Juice" (featuring Rah Digga) | Ski | 3:20 |
| 11. | "Milk" (featuring Busta Rhymes & KRS-One) | KRS-One | 4:30 |
| 12. | "Jack Mode" | Feel Good Skills | 3:55 |
| 13. | "Baby L" (Interlude) | | 1:22 |
| 14. | "Electric Chair" (featuring D.U. & Pacewon) | Ski | 5:18 |
| 15. | "Hello" (Interlude) | | 1:02 |
| 16. | "Everybody Get" | Kobie Brown | 4:29 |
| 17. | "Everybody Get" (Remix) | Q-Tip | 4:31 |
| 18. | "No Brains" (Skit) | | 2:46 |
| Total length: | | | 1:11:12 |
