= I'm Leaving =

"I'm Leaving" may refer to:

- "I'm Leaving" (Aaron Tippin song), a 1998 song by Aaron Tippin released as a single in 1999.
- "I'm Leaving", by Low Roar from 0, 2014
- "I'm Leavin'" (Elvis Presley song), a 1971 song by Elvis Presley released as a single in 1971.
- "I'm Leavin'" (Lisa Stansfield song), a 1997 song by Lisa Stansfield released as a single in 1998.
- "I'm Leavin'" (Outsidaz song), a 2001 song by Outsidaz released as a single in 2002.
