= Nightlife (disambiguation) =

Nightlife is a human social activity.

Nightlife or Night Life or Nite Life may also refer to:

== Games ==
- Nightlife (role-playing game), a splatterpunk game
- Night Life (video game), the first adult game released in Japan
- The Sims 2: Nightlife, the second expansion pack for the video game The Sims 2

== Literature ==
- Nightlife (novel), a fantasy novel by Rob Thurman
- Nightlife, a novel by Thomas Perry
- Nightlife.ca, a Canadian bilingual lifestyle magazine

== Music ==
- Nightlife (quartet), an American barbershop quartet

=== Albums ===
- Night Life (Billy Butler album), and the title song
- Nightlife (Cobra Verde album)
- Nightlife (Erase Errata album), and the title song
- Night Life (Jimi Hendrix album)
- Nightlife (Karl Wolf album), and the title song
- Night Life (Maxine Nightingale album)
- Night Life (Outsidaz album), and the title song
- Nightlife (Pet Shop Boys album)
- Night Life (Ray Price album)
- Nightlife (Thin Lizzy album), and the title song

=== Extended plays ===
- Nightlife (Phantogram EP), a 2011 EP by Phantogram
- Night Life (Outsidaz EP), 2000

=== Songs ===
- "Night Life" (Willie Nelson song), 1960
- "Nightlife" (song), by IAMX
- "Nightlife", by Aretha Franklin from Aretha Arrives
- "Night Life", by Bobby Vinton from Bobby Vinton Sings for Lonely Nights
- "Night Life", by Chicken Shack. (B-side of I'd Rather Go Blind).
- "Night Life", by Foreigner from 4
- "Nightlife", by Green Day from ¡Dos!
- "Nightlife", by Kenickie from At the Club
- "Nightlife", by John Foxx from The Pleasures of Electricity
- "Nightlife", by Scissor Sisters from Night Work
- "Night Life", by The Miracles from City of Angels
- "Night Life", by Zion I from Chapter 4

== Other media ==
- Night Life (1927 film), a silent American drama film
- Night Life (1989 film), an American zombie film
- Nightlife (2020 film), a German comedy film
- Nightlife (radio program), an Australian late-night talkback radio show
- Nightlife (talk show), a 1986–1987 syndicated American late-night television talk show starring David Brenner
- The Nite Life, an Australian Christian pop radio program
- Nightlife, a painting by Archibald Motley, Jr

== Other uses ==
- NightLife, a regularly scheduled event at the California Academy of Sciences
