= The Only Number That Matters Is Won =

Studio album by Pace Won & Mr. Green
- Released: September 4, 2012
- Recorded: 2010–2012
- Genre: Underground hip hop
- Length: 51:33
- Label: Raw Poetix
- Producer: Mr. Green

Pace Won & Mr. Green chronology
The Only Color That Matters Is Green (2008)	The Only Number That Matters Is Won (2012)

The Only Number That Matters Is Won is the second collaborative studio album by American emcee/producer duo Pace Won and Mr. Green. It was released on September 4, 2012, via Raw Poetix Records LLC. The album features guest appearances from Masta Ace, Lee $cratch Perry, Snoop Dogg, Burnt MD, Lawrence Arnell, Rival.

It was supported by two music videos, "Ever Since" and "Something To Say".

Professional ratings
Review scores
Source	Rating
RapReviews	6.5/10 stars

== Track listing ==
No.	Title	Length
1.	"Ever Since"	2:34
2.	"Liquor & Drugs"	4:13
3.	"Big Screen"	4:07
4.	"Something To Say" (featuring Masta Ace)	3:24
5.	"Real Life"	3:45
6.	"We Do This"	4:03
7.	"Be Mine" (featuring Elephant Pelican & Lee $cratch Perry)	4:02
8.	"My God"	3:39
9.	"Fresh Air"	2:50
10.	"Champagne"	3:29
11.	"My Song" (featuring Rival)	3:31
12.	"Insecure"	4:33
13.	"Slow" (featuring Lawrence Arnell)	3:46
14.	"Lock Me Up" (featuring BURNTmd & Snoop Dogg)	3:37
Total length:		51:33

Vinyl only bonus tracks
No.	Title	Length
15.	"Nancy"
16.	"Go Off"
17.	"Two Kings" (featuring Freeway & Tek)
18.	"Metal Is Out" (featuring Malik B.)
19.	"Animal Bikes 2012"
20.	"Spiral Staircase"

Sample credits

- "Liquor & Drugs" sampled "Music For The Funeral Of Queen Mary, Z 860" by Henry Purcell (1695) and "I'm Glad You're Mine" by Al Green (1972)
- "Something To Say" sampled "No Equal" by The Beatnuts (1993), "Side A" by DJ Craze (2000) and "It's Funky Enough" by The D.O.C. (1989)
- "My God" sampled "Cussin', Cryin' and Carryin' On" by Ike & Tina Turner (1969), "They Reminisce Over You (T.R.O.Y.)" by Pete Rock & C.L. Smooth (1992), "Juicy" by Notorious B.I.G. & Total (1994)
- "My Song" sampled "My Song" by Labi Siffre (1972) and "Humpty Dump" by The Vibrettes (1973)
- "Insecure" sampled "Book Of Rhymes" by Nas (2002) and "Get Out of My Life, Woman" by Lee Dorsey (1966)

== Personnel ==
- Aaron Green – producer
- Hans Dekline – mastering
- J.Def – mixing
