= Mareridt =

Studio album by Myrkur
- Released: 15 September 2017
- Studios: Avast! Recording Company, Seattle; Black Tornado, Copenhagen
- Genres: Black metal; dark folk; gothic metal
- Length: 38:19
- Languages: English; Danish; Swedish; Norwegian
- Label: Relapse
- Producer: Randall Dunn

Myrkur chronology
Mausoleum (2016)	Mareridt (2017)	Folkesange (2020)

Deluxe edition

Singles from Mareridt
- 1. "Måneblôt" Released: 28 June 2017; 2. "Ulvinde" Released: 27 July 2017; 3. "De tre piker" Released: 23 August 2017

Mareridt (Danish for "Nightmare") is the second studio album by Myrkur, the black metal project of Danish musician and singer-songwriter Amalie Bruun. The album was released on 15 September 2017 through Relapse Records. Mareridt was recorded between Seattle, United States and Copenhagen, Denmark, and was produced by Randall Dunn. The album's title is Danish for 'nightmare', in reference to the frequent occurrences of sleep paralysis and nightmares which provided the inspiration for much of the album. The album's release was promoted with the release of three singles: "Måneblôt", "Ulvinde", and "De tre piker". The album received widespread acclaim from music critics upon its release.

== Background, writing and musical style ==
Following the release of her debut full-length album, M, Bruun toured across the United States and Europe. Returning to her home in Denmark, Bruun found herself plagued by nightmares and episodes of sleep paralysis, which she has described as "one of the worst times of her life." To cope with these nightmares, she used a notebook to document all the details and symbols in the dreams, and used them as a source of inspiration for her music. Many of the songs were written and composed on a small string instrument in a forest near her home which Bruun used as an escape and source of inspiration. The significant levels of online abuse and death threats she received also partially contributed to her mental state during this time. In July 2017, she released a song titled 'Shadows of Silence' as part of the Decibel Flexidisc series, though the song did not appear on the final album itself. It was also the first Myrkur song written and sung in English.

Critics have noted that Mareridt represents a noticeable change in musical style compared with Myrkur's previous albums. Metal Hammer wrote that the album "mostly leans closer to the earthy, gothic folk of Chelsea Wolfe than post-black metal". They also wrote that "Where she could’ve bowed to the elitists and charged into heavier realms, instead she’s scaled back the extremity, revelling in the kind of heaviness that favours sensory impact over the hammering of guitars as she flits between English and Danish. " Some critics have compared the album favourably with artists such as Dead Can Dance, Sigur Rós, while AllMusic's Thom Jurek argues that the album "not only bridges the stylistic diversity of her three previous releases -- the 2015 album M and two EPS -- but extends their reach into her own creative space, which cannot easily be defined." In their review of the album, Decibel wrote that "black metal's just one of many textures manipulated by Bruun", and that her compositions "owe as much to Nordic folk music as they do to Ulver."

== Recording and production ==
The album was recorded between Avast! Recording Company in Seattle and Black Tornado in Copenhagen. They spent about two weeks recording the strings and folk instruments in Copenhagen before flying back to Avast! Recording Co. in Seattle to record the rest of the instrumentation. Bruun entered the recording studio with 50 songs, which producer Randall Dunn assisted her in curating into the 11 tracks that appear on the standard version of the final album (15 on the deluxe version). Dunn stated in a Decibel feature article that he "helped her focus the record based on her voice and the more multifaceted folk aspect [she was going for]. I tried to help choose songs for the most scenic and dynamic ride as an album and sound and world." Though Bruun had been in touch with other producers about working with them for Mareridt, she ultimately went with Dunn because "If I had chosen a traditional metal producer, I don't think they would understand my classical music references or instruments like the nyckelharpa." The album utilises a wide variety of instruments including violins, organs, the nyckelharpa, and mandola, many of which Bruun performed herself on the album. Dunn also enlisted Aaron Weaver of Wolves in the Throne Room for the recording sessions, who performs "the vast majority" of the drums on Mareridt.

== Critical reception ==
Professional ratings
Aggregate scores
Source	Rating
Metacritic	80/100
Review scores
Source	Rating
AllMusic	4.5/5 stars
Decibel	8/10
Metal Hammer	9/10
Metal Injection	5.5/10
Metallian	5/6
Paste	8.3/10
Sputnikmusic	4.0/5 stars
Terrorizer	8/10

Mareridt was met with widespread critical acclaim. At Metacritic, which assigns a normalized rating out of 100 to reviews from mainstream critics, the album received an average score of 80, based on 5 reviews, which indicates "generally favorable reviews".

AllMusic's Thom Jurek gave the album 4.5/5 stars and wrote very positive assessment, describing Mareridt as "a work of atavistic mystery, unflinching honesty, and balance. It embraces everything from horror and beauty to the sacred and profane; its creator has encountered them all within, faced and accepted them, and ultimately woven them into the fabric of her being as music." He specifically highlighted the song 'Ulvinde' as the album's highlight, comparing it to Loreena McKennitt and Dead Can Dance, and writing that these influences as well as "folk, black metal, and ambient music become one in Mykur's ambitious musicality." NPR Music likewise highlighted the track in their 'Songs We Love' series, and drew attention to Bruun's vocal performance. Justin Schafer wrote that "It's rough stuff, lyrically and visually, but Bruun's singing voice is beautiful. Her delivery, full of sustaining notes that subtly decay, is reminiscent of choral music — with all the ritualism, religiosity and awe it entails." Decibel wrote that "the album's heaviness requests validation from no genre, balancing frostbitten tremolos and end-days doom with nyckelharpa and mandola flourishes", concluding that "Mareridt isn't the embodiment of all that is trve, and it's a better record for it." Metal Hammer gave the album a flawless 5/5 rating, writing that "Not since The Satanist has extreme metal presented a vision so ready to stride into metal’s wider consciousness. Amalie has created a portal into a world torn apart by light and darkness, and what is left might just be the finest metal album of 2017, and one of the greatest albums of recent times."

=== Accolades ===
Publication	Accolade	Year	Rank	Ref.
Rough Trade	Albums of the Year	2017	27	

== Track listing ==
No.	Title	Length
1.	"Mareridt"	3:24
2.	"Måneblôt"	3:33
3.	"The Serpent"	4:04
4.	"Crown"	4:56
5.	"Elleskudt"	4:22
6.	"De tre piker"	3:12
7.	"Funeral" (featuring Chelsea Wolfe)	3:00
8.	"Ulvinde"	4:24
9.	"Gladiatrix"	2:51
10.	"Kætteren"	2:11
11.	"Børnehjem"	2:22
Total length:		38:19

CD Deluxe Edition bonus tracks
No.	Title	Length
12.	"Death of Days"	3:29
Total length:		41:48

Digital Deluxe Edition bonus tracks
No.	Title	Length
13.	"Kvindelil" (Featuring Chelsea Wolfe)	3:15
14.	"Løven"	4:02
15.	"Himlen Blev Sort"	3:08
Total length:		52:04

Vinyl Deluxe Edition bonus tracks
No.	Title	Length
16.	"Två Konungabarn"	3:36
Total length:		55:40

== Personnel ==
=== Musicians ===
- Myrkur (Amalie Bruun) – vocals, piano, nyckelharpa, violin, guitar, percussion, synths, organ
- Chelsea Wolfe – vocals (on tracks 7, 13), guitar (on tracks 7, 13)
- Ben Chisholm – guitar, programming (on track 13)
- William Hayes – guitar
- Andreas Lynge – guitar, bass
- Ole Luk – acoustic guitar (on track 15)
- Abbey Blackwell – contrabass
- Aaron Weaver – drums, percussion
- Brad Mowen – drums (on track 7), percussion (on track 7)
- Maria Franz – percussion
- Randall Dunn – synths, loops
- Christopher Juul – Jew's harp, percussion, mandola
- Veslemøy Aalde Heyerdahl – choir
- Ida Sandberg Motzfeldt – choir

=== Additional personnel ===
- Randall Dunn – producer, mixing, mastering
- Nickolaj Nielsen – engineer
- Daria Endresen – photography
- Christopher Juul – recording, mixing (track 16)
- Odd Nerdrum – alternative cover art on deluxe edition

== Charts ==
Chart (2017)	Peak position
Belgian Albums (Ultratop Flanders)	47
Belgian Albums (Ultratop Wallonia)	150
Dutch Albums (Album Top 100)	172
German Albums (Offizielle Top 100)	89
UK Albums (Official Charts)	91
US Heatseekers Albums (Billboard)	4
US Independent Albums (Billboard)	21
US Indie Store Album Sales (Billboard)	20
