= Amalie Bruun =

Danish musician and actress (born 1985)

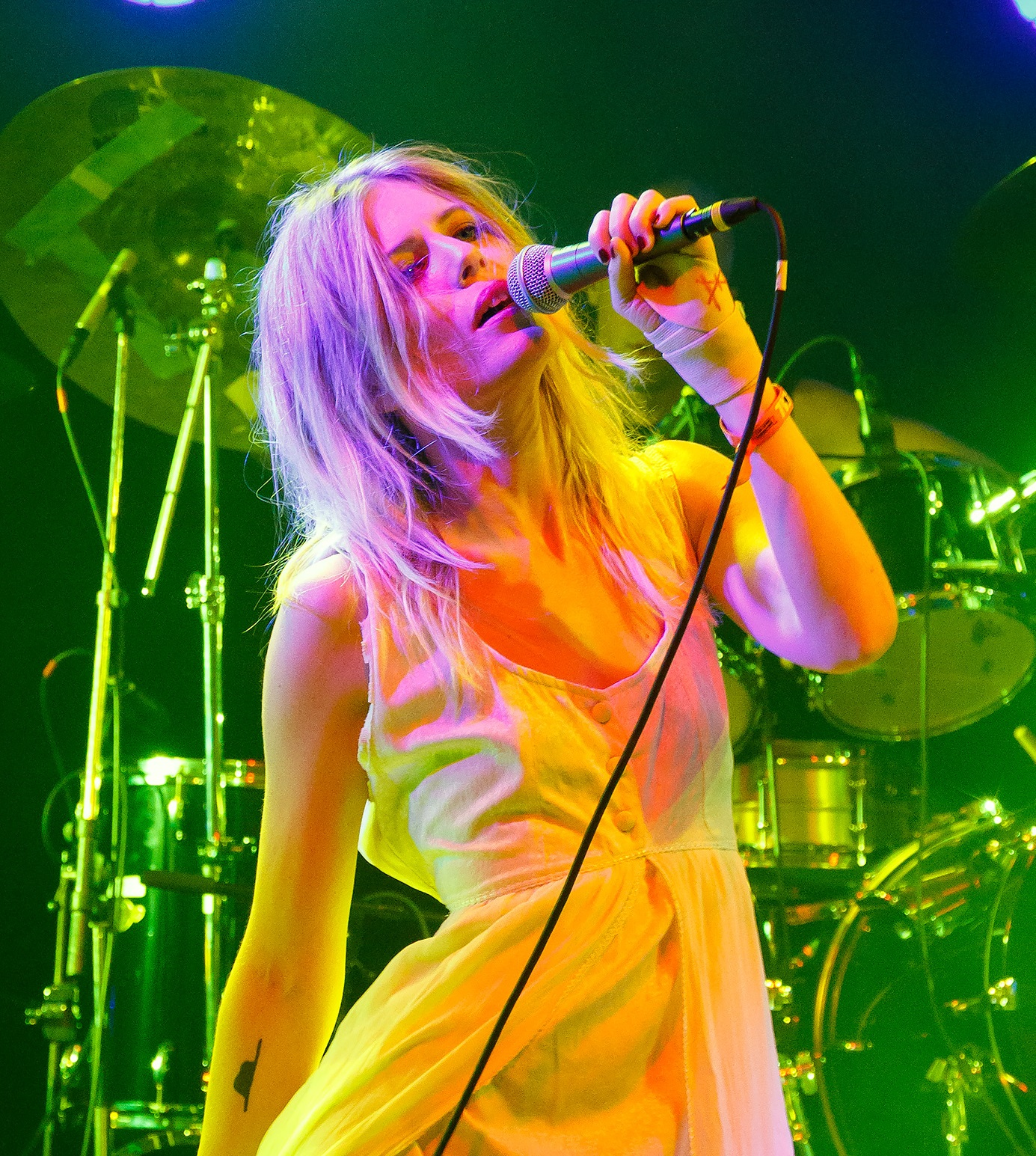
- Bruun performing with Myrkur at Roskilde Festival 2015 in Denmark

Background information
- Also known as: Myrkur
- Born: Amalie Bruun; 6 January 1985 (age 41); Copenhagen, Denmark
- Genres: Post-black metal, indie pop, dream pop, Nordic folk
- Occupations: Singer, actress, musician
- Instruments: Vocals, piano, guitar, nyckelharpa, mandola
- Years active: 2006–present
- Labels: Relapse, Downtown
- Member of: Myrkur
- Formerly of: Ex Cops
- Website: myrkurmusic.band

Amalie Bruun (born 6 January 1985) is a Danish musician, actress and model. She currently fronts the one-person black metal project Myrkur, where she acts as songwriter and multi-instrumentalist. Bruun has released four studio albums, one live album and two EPs with Myrkur, and one studio album and three EPs as a solo artist. She is the former lead singer of the indie pop band Ex Cops, which was active from 2011 to 2014.

== Career ==
=== Music ===
Bruun released her debut album in 2006. She wrote the record with her father Michael Bruun. She is a pianist and guitarist and also writes songs with other composers, including Moh Denebi. In 2008, she created the title song for the reality show Paradise Hotel, entitled "If You Give It Up". Amalie Bruun moved to New York later in 2008 and won the New York Songwriters Circle international award.

In 2010, Bruun released the EP Branches, which was recorded at Pirate Studios in New York in partnership with Watt White. She began modeling, starring in a Martin Scorsese-directed Chanel advertisement and the music video for The Lonely Island's 2011 song "Jack Sparrow" featuring Michael Bolton.

In spring 2012, Bruun released the single "Siren", written and produced in collaboration with Mark Saunders on A:Larm Music. In 2013, Amalie also appeared on R.A. the Rugged Man's album Legends Never Die, providing background and chorus vocals for track 3, "Definition of a Rap Flow". In 2015, she once more appeared alongside R.A. on "Dark Streets" – track 12 of Malik B.'s Unpredictable.

Both Ex Cops and Myrkur have garnered Bruun critical acclaim from publications including Pitchfork, Spin, and NPR Music. Bruun has also appeared with Myrkur and Ex Cops at renowned music festivals such as Roskilde Festival in Denmark, Wacken Open Air in Germany and South by Southwest in Texas.

In 2022, Bruun provided vocals for the score of the Netflix series Vikings: Valhalla.

==== Ex Cops (2011–2014) ====
Bruun formed the indie pop band Ex Cops in 2011 as a duo with Brian Harding. The band drew comparisons to music released on Sarah Records and Flying Nun Records. Ex Cops released two albums: 2013's True Hallucinations and 2014's Daggers. Daggers was produced and co-written by The Smashing Pumpkins lead singer Billy Corgan, and featured guest appearances from singers Ariel Pink and LP. Ex Cops broke up in 2014, with Bruun remaining on good terms with Harding.

==== Myrkur (2014–present) ====
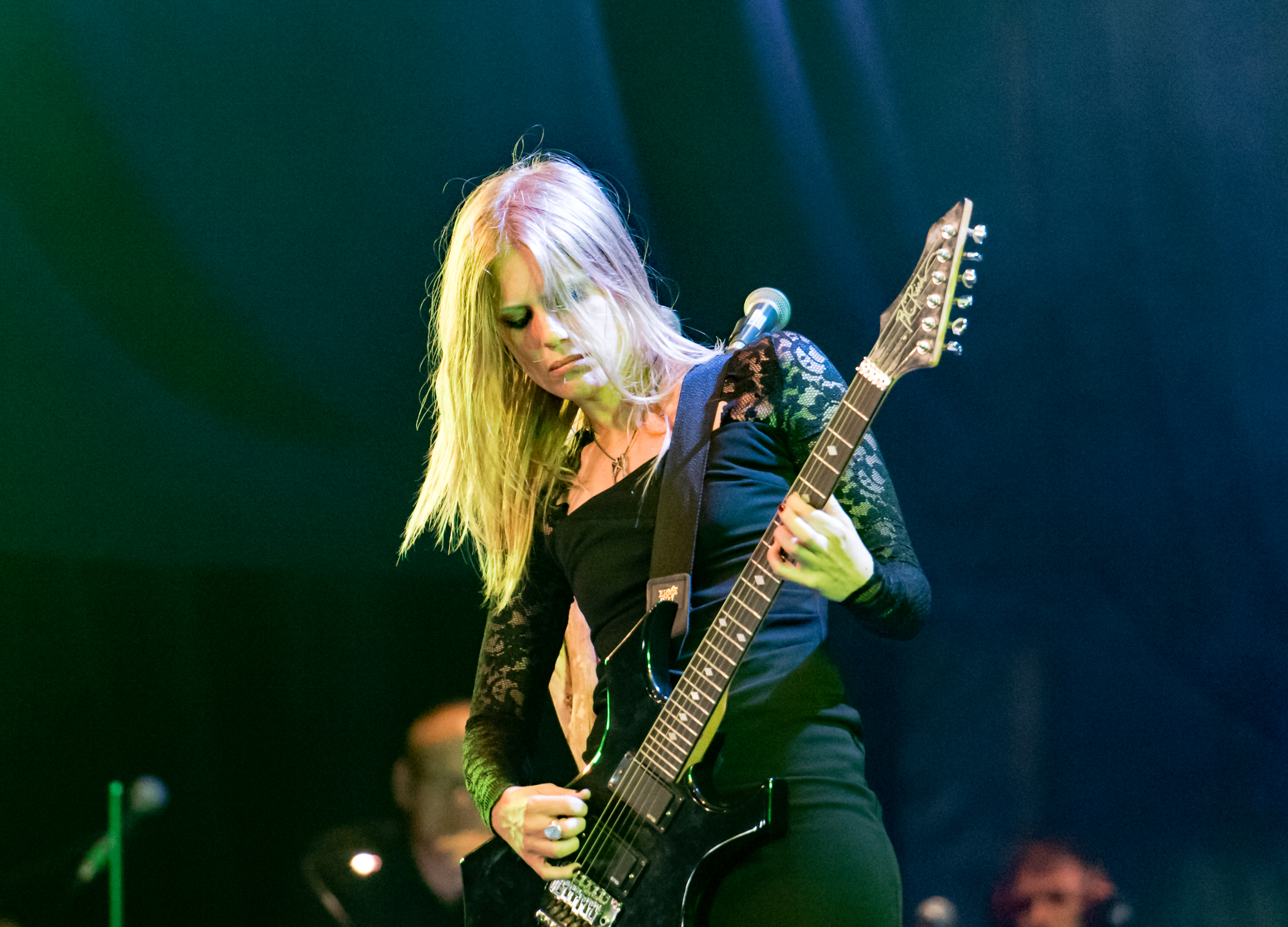
Bruun performing with Myrkur at Wacken Open Air 2016

A self-professed "black metal girl at heart", Bruun was revealed to be the writer, performer and producer of Relapse Records black metal project Myrkur in 2014. The project's name comes from the Icelandic word for darkness. Bruun became a black metal fan after listening to Darkthrone's Transilvanian Hunger album for the first time. She released a self-titled EP under anonymity before she revealed her identity in September 2014. Her debut album under the Myrkur moniker, M, was produced by Ulver frontman Kristoffer Rygg and featured members of Mayhem, Arch Enemy and Satyricon in her backing band.

Bruun received a torrent of sexist backlash from metal fans after beginning the Myrkur project, at one point deactivating her Facebook account because of endless death threats. She released her second album as Myrkur, Mareridt, in 2017. With her third album Folkesange, released in 2020, Bruun shifted from black metal to making traditional Scandinavian folk music.

Bruun also appeared on the EP The Alchemy Project by the Dutch symphonic metal band Epica, on the song "Sirens – Of Blood and Water", alongside Charlotte Wessels. A music video for this song was released on 11 November 2022.

== Personal life ==
In 2018, Bruun married the American drummer and personal trainer Keith Abrami, known for playing drums in death metal bands Artificial Brain and Shredded. On 4 May 2019, Bruun announced via Instagram that she was expecting her first child. Bruun gave birth to her son Otto on 21 September 2019.

Bruun formerly dated Brian Harding, the other half of the indie pop duo Ex Cops.

Bruun is daughter of the Danish singer-songwriter, guitarist, and producer Michael Bruun and has two brothers, William and Jonas.

== Discography ==
As Amalie Bruun

- Amalie Bruun (2006)
- Housecat (EP) (2008)
- Branches (EP) (2010)
- Crush (EP) (2012)

With Ex Cops

- True Hallucinations (LP) (2013)
- Daggers (LP) (2014)

As Myrkur

- Myrkur (EP) (2014)
- M (2015)
- Mausoleum (Live album) (2016)
- Mareridt (2017)
- Folkesange (2020)
- Ragnarok: Original Soundtrack (2023)
- Spine (2023)
