= M (Myrkur album) =

Studio album by Myrkur
- Released: 21 August 2015
- Recorded: December 2014
- Studios: Oak Hill, Subsonic Society & Tomba Emmanuelle, Oslo
- Genres: Black metal; dark folk; gothic metal
- Length: 36:58
- Label: Relapse
- Producers: Kristoffer Rygg; Myrkur

Myrkur chronology
Myrkur EP (2014)	M (2015)	Mausoleum (2016)

Singles from M
- 1. "Onde børn" Released: 30 June 2015

M is the debut studio album by black metal project Myrkur, by Danish musician and singer-songwriter Amalie Bruun. Produced by Kristoffer "Garm" Rygg of Ulver, it was released on 21 August 2015 through Relapse Records.

Featuring a black and gothic metal sound, the album melds influences from various genres, including second wave black metal, atmospheric post-metal, gothic, darkwave, Scandinavian folk and classical music. The album was named the Best Hard Rock Album of 2015 by Gaffa.

== Critical reception ==
Professional ratings
Aggregate scores
Source	Rating
Metacritic	83/100
Review scores
Source	Rating
Allmusic	4/5 stars
The Austin Chronicle	4/5 stars
Consequence of Sound	B
Exclaim!	9/10
Pitchfork	7.9/10
Spin	7/10
Sputnikmusic	2.4/5
Terrorizer	8/10

Upon its release, M received positive reviews from music critics. At Metacritic, which assigns a normalized rating out of 100 to reviews from critics, the album received an average score of 83, which indicates "universal acclaim", based on 10 reviews, and was the 85th highest rated album of 2015. Allmusic's Thom Jurek wrote: "Myrkur's music melds all of her adopted stylistic elements, lets their seams show, and emerges with an innovative, alchemical creation of her own. M expands on black metal's boundaries yet holds its dark, foreboding spirit close." The Austin Chronicle critic Michael Toland stated: "Danish raven Amalie Bruun integrates extreme intensity into both genres' [goth/black metal's] inherent drama." Sean Barry of Consequence of Sound thought that "M doesn’t differentiate itself greatly from the early work of many black metal artists." Barry further added: "The album shines with potential and the promise that a more unique followup waits further down the trail."

Exclaim! critic Natalie Zina Walschots praised the album, writing: "The textures of M are even more finely hewn and interwoven than its predecessor, resulting in a record that is at once profoundly tactile and deeply sensual." Grayson Haver Currin of Pitchfork thought that "on M, Bruun is free and clear of any identity drama—and a much more convincing bandleader for it." Spin critic Colin Joyce stated: "What remains Bruun’s strongest suit is the way she juxtaposes the extremity of her influences." Joyce further concluded: "She comes out of more subdued sections to use blast beats like scare tactics, drops in glacial vocal harmonies as soothing lullabies." The Quietus' Dean Brown was also positive in his assessment of the album, writing: "By conveying the masculine and feminine duality inherent in old musical traditions and modern musical developments, Bruun has composed a truly rewarding record that defies direct categorisation."

Nevertheless, Sputnikmusic's Elijah K. gave the album a mixed review, describing the album's sound as "painfully bland and too on the nose."

== Track listing ==
All tracks are written by Myrkur except "Byssan Lull" (Traditional).

No.	Title	Length
1.	"Skøgen skulle dø" (The whore had to die)	5:17
2.	"Hævnen" (The revenge)	3:23
3.	"Onde børn" (Evil kids)	4:09
4.	"Vølvens spådom" (Prophecy of the Völva)	1:37
5.	"Jeg er guden, I er tjenerne" (I am God, you are the servants)	4:03
6.	"Nordlys" (Northern light)	2:15
7.	"Mordet" (The murder)	3:41
8.	"Byssan lull" (Swedish lullaby best known version by Evert Taube)	2:38
9.	"Dybt i skoven" (Deep in the forest)	3:09
10.	"Skaði" (Skadi)	4:29
11.	"Norn"	2:17
Total length:		36:58

=== Notes ===
- "Onde børn" is featured the song in Simlish on the 2014 video game The Sims 4 as part of The Sims 4: Nifty Knitting stuff pack released in 2020. It can be heard through the Metal station on stereos.

== Personnel ==
Album personnel as adapted from Bandcamp.

=== Myrkur ===
- Amalie Bruun – vocals, guitar, piano, production

=== Session musicians ===
- Teloch (Mayhem, Nidingr) – guitar, bass
- Øyvind Myrvoll (Nidingr) – drums
- Ole-Henrik Moe – fiðla, Hardingfele, violin
- Håvard Jørgensen – acoustic guitar
- Tone Reichelt – horn
- Martin Taxt – tuba
- Chris Amott (Arch Enemy) – additional guitar (7)

=== Production and design ===
- Kristoffer "Garm" Rygg (Ulver) – mixing, production
- Anders Møller – mixing
- Jaime Gomez Arellano – mastering
- Trine + Kim Design Studio – photography
- Orion Landau – design

== Charts ==
Chart (2015)	Peak position
Belgian Albums (Ultratop Flanders)	123
Belgian Albums (Ultratop Wallonia)	131
US Heatseekers Albums (Billboard)	11
US Independent Albums (Billboard)	39
US Indie Store Album Sales (Billboard)	17
US World Albums (Billboard)	1
