= Unpredictable (Malik B. album) =

Studio album by Malik B & Mr. Green
- Released: February 24, 2015
- Genre: Hip hop
- Length: 36:18
- Label: Enemy Soil
- Producer: Mr. Green

Malik B. chronology
Street Assault (2005)	Unpredictable (2015)

Mr. Green chronology
Ill Piano Classic Beats Vol. 4 (2013)	Unpredictable (2015)	Live From The Streets (2015)

Unpredictable is the first collaborative studio album by American rapper Malik B. and producer Mr. Green. It was released on February 24, 2015. It was also the last album released by Malik B. before his death on July 29, 2020.

== Background ==
With his popular "Live From The Streets" web series (Noisey/Vice), Mr. Green has forged a reputation for harnessing the serendipitous musical moments that arise from life's chance encounters with talented musicians. So when he had one of those encounters with the legendary Roots crew emcee, Malik B, outside of The Roots' annual picnic in 2012, it made perfect sense that they would turn a brief moment of mutual inspiration into a full-fledged collaborative album. Malik B and Mr. Green's collaborative album, "Unpredictable", is an appropriate title for the thirteen track journey through the kind of handcrafted hip hop created when two skilled musicians come together to capture the mystique that unpredictably arrives during the recording process. "Malik would show up at the studio with a garbage bag of rhymes and go through them. Some of them were old and weathered, literally falling apart", describes Mr. Green. "Then he would just start recording the song in one take: intro, verses, chorus. It was nothing like I'd seen before". Although recording ''Unpredictable'' was chaotic at times, the duo's chemistry is undeniable. Malik adds, "Our chemistry is just crazy; our chemistry is like algebra".

Professional ratings
Review scores
Source	Rating
RapReviews	8.5/10 stars

The song "Dolla Bill" was featured on the video game MLB the show '25 by Sony PlayStation Studio.

== Track listing ==
All tracks produced by Mr. Green

No.	Title	Length
1.	"Dolla Bill"	1:18
2.	"Metal Is Out" (featuring Benefit)	2:32
3.	"Crown Of Thorns" (featuring Skrewtape)	2:51
4.	"What Can I Say"	2:28
5.	"We Gonna Make It" (featuring Nate Green)	2:58
6.	"Devil"	2:50
7.	"Sometimes"	2:33
8.	"Definition"	3:34
9.	"Tyrants"	3:58
10.	"Rips In The Paper"	3:17
11.	"Rhyme Exercise"	1:38
12.	"Dark Streets" (featuring R.A. the Rugged Man & Amalie Bruun)	4:10
13.	"Fake Friends" (Bonus Track)	2:05
Total length:		36:18

Samples

- "What Can I Say" sampled "What Can I Say" by Mr. Green (2006)
- "Tyrants" sampled "The Stopper (Main Attraction Remix)" by Cutty Ranks (1991)

== Personnel ==
- Malik Abdul Basit – primary performer
- Aaron Green – producer
- Scott Stallone at Found Sound Recording (Phila, PA) – mixing on tracks 1–11,13
- Chris Conway – mixing on track 12
- Pete Humphreys – mastering
- Vshootz – photography
- Dan Bradley – design and layout
