= Mausoleum (album) =

Live EP by Myrkur

Live album by Myrkur
- Released: 19 August 2016
- Venue: Emanuel Vigelands Museum
- Length: 27:10
- Language: Danish; English; Swedish
- Label: Relapse

Myrkur chronology
M (2015)	Mausoleum (2016)	Mareridt (2017)

Singles from Mausoleum
- 1. "Jeg er guden, I er tjenerne" Released: 21 June 2016

Mausoleum is a live album by the Danish band Myrkur, released through Relapse Records on 19 August 2016. It consists of acoustic and choral versions of Myrkur's music, which originally had been released as heavy metal songs. Mausoleum was recorded in the Emanuel Vigeland Mausoleum in Oslo, Norway, and features the Norwegian Girls' Choir and the guitarist Håvard Jørgensen.

== Recording ==
Mausoleum is a live album with songs by the Danish heavy metal project Myrkur, rearranged for acoustic and choral performances. Most tracks are from Myrkur's debut album M (2015). One song, "Den lille piges død", was new. In addition to Myrkur's songs, there are two cover songs: Evert Taube's lullaby "Byssan lull" and Bathory's "Song to Hall Up High".

The recording took place in the Emanuel Vigeland Mausoleum, which is a mausoleum the Norwegian artist Emanuel Vigeland designed for himself in Oslo and which was turned into a museum after his death. The music was performed by Myrkur's Amalie Bruun who accompanied herself on piano, together with the Norwegian Girls' Choir and the guitarist Håvard Jørgensen.

== Reception ==
Politiken's Pernille Jensen called Mausoleum magnificent and evocative and described it as "metal with an elf-like girls' choir" that gave her goosebumps. Mattias Kling of Aftonbladet wrote that Mausoleum sees Myrkur go as far as possible in infusing black metal with mystical, eerie and folkloric elements. He wrote that although the music is beautiful, and the performance creates inner images of what the live concert must have been like, the album gives the feeling of only being "half the experience". Christoffer Bertzell of Nöjesguiden said it is "hard to not be moved" by the "ominous and gloomy melodies" and recommended people to try to recreate the original concert setting by listening to the album "in a dark and cold cave". Metal Hammer's Dom Lawson wrote that Mausoleum may not convince black metal purists, for whom Myrkur was controversial and regarded as "hipster-friendly", but Lawson called the album "startling, extreme in its own way and occasionally rather magical". AllMusic's Thom Jurek wrote that the stripped-down versions of the songs reveal both Myrkur's and the entire black metal genre's heritage from European folk music, and that the interplay between Bruun's piano and Jørgensen's guitar adds a classical element. He said the album should appeal to listeners who enjoy crossovers between classical music, dark wave and metal.

== Track listing ==
No.	Title	Notes	Length
1.	"Vølvens spådom"	transl. The völva's foretelling	1:16
2.	"Jeg er guden, I er tjenerne"	transl. I am the god, you are the servants	3:22
3.	"Skøgen skulle dø"	transl. The harlot would die	3:20
4.	"Byssan lull"	transl. The galley calm; music and lyrics by Evert Taube	2:39
5.	"Den lille piges død"	transl. The little girl's death	4:01
6.	"Frosne vind"	transl. Frozen wind	1:50
7.	"Onde børn"	transl. Evil children	4:00
8.	"Song to Hall Up High"	Bathory cover; music and lyrics by Thomas "Quorthon" Forsberg	2:55
9.	"Dybt i skoven"	transl. Deep in the forest	3:47
Total length:			27:10

== Charts ==
Chart performance for Mausoleum
Chart (2016)	Peak position
Belgian Albums (Ultratop Flanders)	165
Belgian Albums (Ultratop Wallonia)	150
