= Myrkur (EP) =

EP by Myrkur
- Released: 12 September 2014
- Genre: Black metal; gothic metal
- Length: 24:06
- Label: Relapse

Myrkur chronology
Myrkur (2014)	M (2015)

Singles from Myrkur
- 1. "Nattens Barn" Released: 15 July 2015

Myrkur is the self-titled debut EP by the black metal project Myrkur, by Danish musician and singer-songwriter Amalie Bruun. It was released on 12 September 2014 through Relapse Records. The track "Nattens Barn" was released as the first single off the EP, with an accompanying music video.

== Critical reception ==
Professional ratings
Review scores
Source	Rating
Angry Metal Guy	3.5/5
Pitchfork	5.9/10
PopMatters	7/10
SLUG	Favourable

PopMatters critic Zachary Houle wrote: "While it’s possible that you can poke at the Myrkur EP and find plenty of faults with it—for one, it would have been nicer if all of the elements that make up the sound were blended together a bit more—it is nevertheless quite agreeable." Houle concluded: "Myrkur and Myrkur are both beautiful and charmed, and if you want to hear black metal music that's heartfelt and from the womb, she and it are as good of a starting point as any." Grayson Haver Currin of Pitchfork stated that "moments of Myrkur move beyond narrative intrigue, hinting at more than this start can deliver." Jon Hadusek in Consequence of Sound dubbed Myrkur "the best new metal artist of 2014".

== Track listing ==
All tracks are written by Myrkur except "Ulvesangen" written by Sebastian and taken from his musical over Ronia the Robber's Daughter.

No.	Title	Length
1.	"Ravnens Banner" (Raven's Banner)	4:08
2.	"Frosne Vind" (Frozen Wind)	1:50
3.	"Må Du Brænde i Helvede" (May You Burn in Hell)	4:03
4.	"Latvian Fegurð"	4:19
5.	"Dybt i Skoven" (Deep in the Forest)	3:02
6.	"Nattens Barn" (Night's Child)	5:55
7.	"Ulvesangen" (The Wolf Song)	0:46
Total length:		24:06

== Personnel ==
Myrkur

- Amalie Bruun – vocals, guitar, bass

Session musicians

- Thorleif Störölf – bass
- Rex Myrnur – drum programming

== Charts ==
Chart (2014)	Peak position
US Heatseekers Albums (Billboard)	47
US World Albums (Billboard)	2
