= Tone Vigeland =

Norwegian jewellery designer (1938–2024)

- Born: 6 August 1938; Oslo, Norway
- Died: 18 March 2024 (aged 85)
- Education: Norwegian National Academy of Craft and Art Industry
- Occupations: Goldsmith/silversmith and jewellery designer
- Relatives: Emanuel Vigeland (grandfather); Maria Vigeland (aunt)
- Awards: Prince Eugen Medal; Order of St. Olav

Tone Vigeland (6 August 1938 – 18 March 2024) was a Norwegian goldsmith and silversmith and a jewellery designer.

== Personal life ==
Vigeland was born on 6 August 1938 in Oslo to painter Per Vigeland and Randi Helleberg. She was a granddaughter of painter Emanuel Vigeland, and thus a niece of painter and sculptor Maria Vigeland. She was married to physician Atle Rønning Arnesen from 1963 to 1988. Vigeland died on 18 March 2024, at the age of 85.

== Career ==
Vigeland studied at the Norwegian National Academy of Craft and Art Industry from 1955 to 1957, where she had goldsmiths Oskar Sørensen and Sigurd Alf Eriksen as teachers.

Vigeland is represented in galleries worldwide, including the European Victoria and Albert Museum, Pinakothek der Moderne and Musée des Arts Décoratifs, Paris, New York City museums Museum of Modern Art and the Museum of Art and Design, Cooper Hewitt, Smithsonian Design Museum, and the Museum of Fine Arts, Houston. She was awarded the Prince Eugen Medal in 1988, and was decorated Commander of the Order of St. Olav in 1996.
