= Lovisenberg Church =

Coordinates: 59°55′58.3″N 10°44′42″E

- Lovisenberg kirke
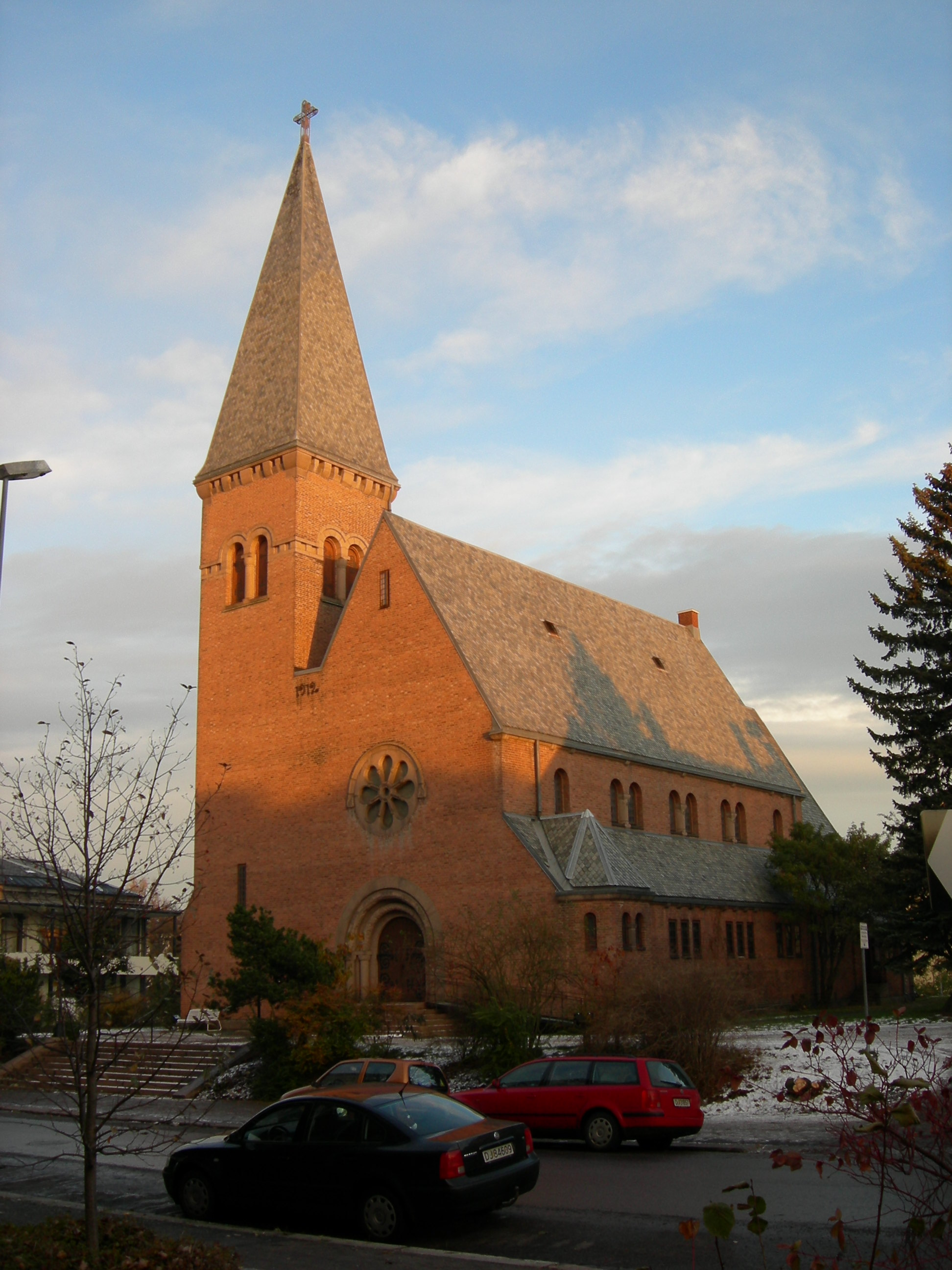

- Location in Oslo Lovisenberg Church (Norway)
- Location: Lovisenberggata 9, Oslo
- Country: Norway
- Denomination: Church of Norway
- Churchmanship: Evangelical Lutheran

History
- Status: Parish church

Architecture
- Functional status: Active
- Architect: Harald Aars
- Architectural type: Romanesque Revival
- Completed: 1912

Specifications
- Materials: Brick

Administration
- Diocese: Diocese of Oslo
- Deanery: Oslo arch-deanery
- Parish: Sentrum og St. Hanshaugen

Lovisenberg Church (Norwegian: Lovisenberg kirke) is a church in the neighborhood of Lovisenberg in the district of St. Hanshaugen in Oslo, Norway. The church is a basilica in Romanesque Revival style. The building is made of red brick and has a gable roof covered with slate. The bell tower is located to the side of the ridge and baptismal sacristy is to the right of the main entrance.

The church is adorned with stained glass by Maria Vigeland in the choir showing the birth of Jesus, the Crucifixion and the Angel in the empty tomb. She has also created pieces of stained glass in side windows. On the altar is a cross from Oberammergau. The pulpit, the altar rail, the benches and other fixtures are made of spruce of the local carpenter master, A. Berger. The baptismal font is in blue white marble from Velfjord Municipality, Nordland. The church got a new organ in 1995. The two church bells are created by Olsen Nauen Bell Foundry.

Lovisenberg Church is listed and protected by law by the Norwegian Directorate for Cultural Heritage.

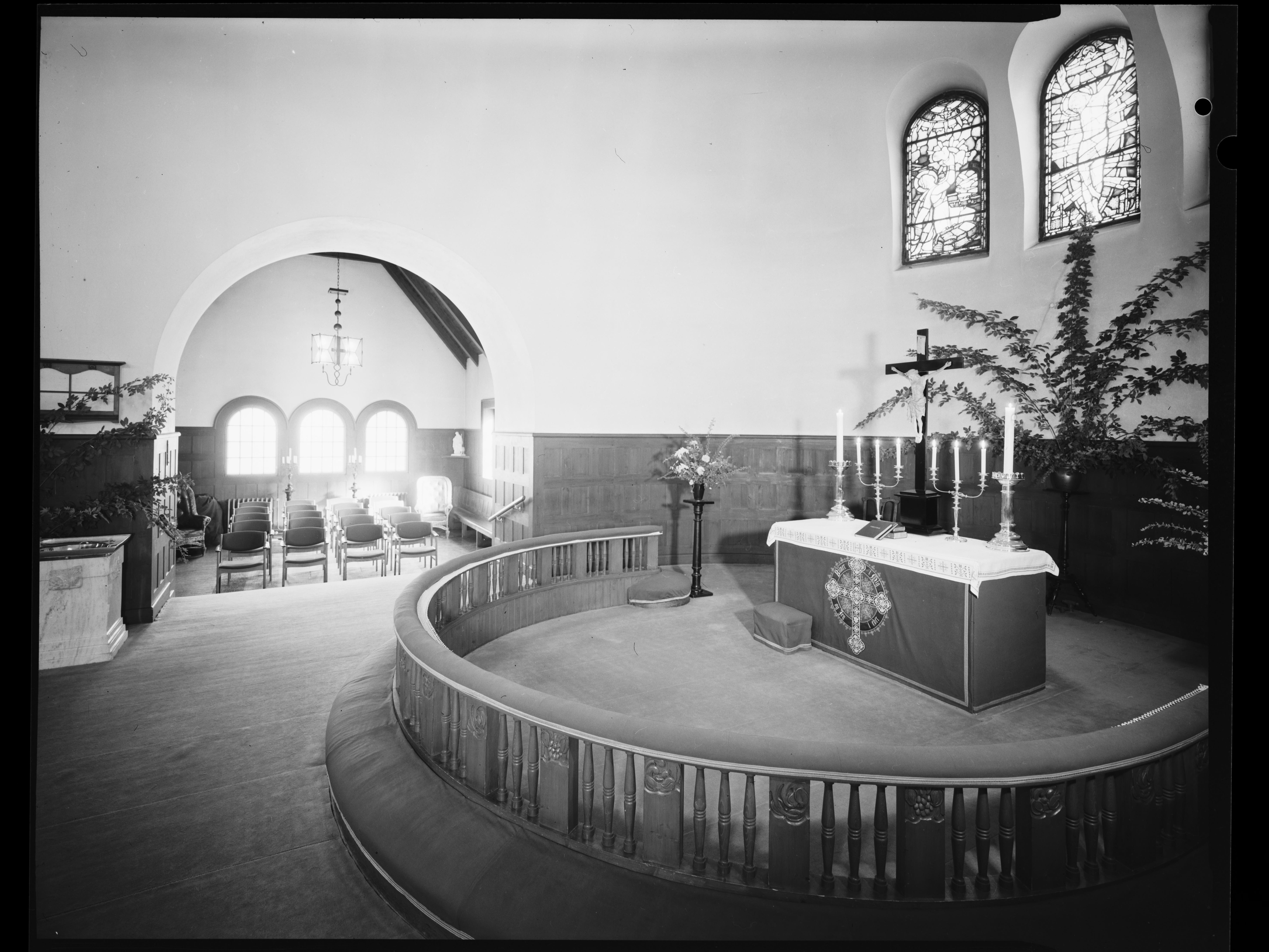
Interior
