= The Bricks (album) =

Studio album by Outsidaz
- Released: June 19, 2001
- Recorded: 2000–2001
- Genre: Hardcore hip hop
- Length: 54:48
- Label: Ruffhouse
- Producer: Chris Schwartz (exec.); Young Zee; Govmattic; Self-Service; Dukewon Exculabre Productions; Rocwilder; DJ Twinz; Hotrunner; Bamba Nazar; Mr. Porter

Outsidaz chronology
Night Life (2000)	The Bricks (2001)

Professional ratings
Review scores
Source	Rating
AllMusic	3/5 stars
Vibe	2.5/5 stars

The Bricks is the only studio album by American rap group the Outsidaz. It was released on June 19, 2001 via Rufflife Records. The record featured guest appearances from Method Man, Redman and Kelis. Audio production was handled by Rockwilder, Mr. Porter, Young Zee, DJ Twinz, Hotrunner, Gov Mattic, Self-Service, with Chris Schwartz served as executive producer. The Bricks peaked at number 68 on the Top R&B/Hip-Hop Albums, number 48 on the Top Heatseekers and number 29 on the Independent Albums charts.

== Track listing ==
No.	Title	Producer(s)	Length
1.	"Intro"	Dukewon Exculabre Productions	1:31
2.	"Keep On"	Rockwilder	3:43
3.	"Who You Be" (featuring Method Man & Redman)	DJ Twinz	4:29
4.	"Interlude"		0:43
5.	"I'm Leavin'" (featuring Kelis)	Hotrunner	4:46
6.	"State To State"	Ess Man; Mr. Porter	3:58
7.	"Interlude"		0:47
8.	"Sign Of The Power"	Govmattic	5:22
9.	"Hell Yeah"	Govmattic	3:37
10.	"Rehab"	Self-Service	4:15
11.	"We Be The O's"	Self-Service	4:32
12.	"Music"	Bamba Nazar	4:39
13.	"Interlude/Yo Doe Doe"	Young Zee; Robert "Shea" Taylor	4:31
14.	"The Bricks"	Young Zee	4:14
15.	"Money, Money, Money (Remix)" (remixed by Rugged Ness)		3:41
Total length:			54:48

== Personnel ==
Outsidaz

- Tyree Smith (Axe) - rap (tracks 1, 6, 12, 14–15)
- Aubrey King (Az Izz) - rap (tracks 1, 9–10, 12, 15)
- Brian Bostic (D.U.) - rap (tracks 4, 6, 8–10, 13–15)
- Denton Dawes (Denzy) - rap (tracks 1, 6, 11–12, 15)
- Aubrey Polk (DJ Spunk) - scratches (track 1)
- Nathaniel Longchamp (Nawshis) - rap (tracks 1, 6, 10, 14–15)
- Jerome Hinds (Pace Won) - rap (tracks 1–3, 5, 8–13)
- Rashia Tashan Fisher (Rah Digga) - rap (tracks 1, 5, 12)
- Larry Cooper (S.A.S.S.) - rap (track 7)
- Salih Ibn Al Bayyinah Scaife (Slang Ton) - rap (track 1)
- Shakir Nur-al-din Abdullah (Yah Yah) - rap (tracks 1, 6–9, 12–14)
- Dewayne Battle (Young Zee) - rap (tracks 1–5, 8–9, 11–13, 15)

Additional credits

- Aubrey Williams - producer (tracks 8–9)
- Bamba Nazaar - producer (track 12)
- Chris Schwartz - executive producer
- Clifford Smith - rap (track 3)
- Dana Stinson - producer (track 2)
- Denaun Porter - producer (track 6)
- Edward Hinson - producer (tracks 10–11)
- Kelis Rogers - vocals (track 5)
- Reggie Noble - rap (track 3)
- Robert 'Shea' Taylor - producer (track 13)
- Terrance Lovelace - producer (track 5)
- Vincent Carroll - vocals (track 15)

== Charts ==
Chart (2001)	Peak position
US Top R&B/Hip-Hop Albums (Billboard)	68
US Independent Albums (Billboard)	29
US Heatseekers Albums (Billboard)	48
