= Saurus and Bones =

American hip hop group

Saurus And Bones
- Also known as: Saurus N Bones
- Origin: Chicago, Illinois, U.S.
- Genres: Rap; hip hop
- Years active: 2001–present
- Labels: Saurus And Bones LLC
- Members: Saurus K; Bones
- Website: Facebook; Twitter; MySpace

Saurus K (born Keith Hoskins) and Bones (born Brett Hoskins), better known as Saurus And Bones, are American rap artists from Naperville, Illinois.

== Career ==
Saurus And Bones started rapping in the summer of 2001 and have spent the last 17 years perfecting their style. With the release of their first extended play, "Skeletal Thesaurus", Saurus And Bones became involved with the Chicago hip-hop scene, networking and performing at many shows.

Their style is based on hardcore intensity and original metaphoric lyrics saturated with multisyllabic rhyme patterns and tied together with a midwest influence. Recently, Saurus N Bones have been opening for AK at shows around Chicago and its suburbs. They have also opened for other big artists, including Kottonmouth Kings.

=== "Mind Like Mine" ===
Saurus And Bones gained attention in 2009 with their debut album, Mind Like Mine, including the single "Legendary" which featured Chicago hip hop artists Twista and AK of Do Or Die. The album also featured Stubhy Pandav of Lucky Boys Confusion, Young Zee of the Outsidaz, and Big Left formerly of La Coka Nostra.

== Discography ==
=== Studio albums ===
- 2009 - Mind Like Mine

Mind Like Mine

Studio album by Saurus And Bones
- Released: December 14, 2009
- Genre: Rap; hip hop
- Length: 55:37
- Label: Saurus And Bones LLC
- Producer: Brett Hoskins (exec.); Keith Hoskins (exec.)

No.	Title	Length
1.	"Tactical"	1:35
2.	"Mind Like Mine"	2:58
3.	"Our Comments" (additional vocals by Bard)	3:51
4.	"Get Crushed" (featuring Big Left)	4:04
5.	"Hyperdrive" (featuring Flawell Voc)	3:34
6.	"Lose Your Life"	1:57
7.	"It Is I" (featuring AK of Do Or Die)	5:55
8.	"Set It In Stone" (featuring SonnyJim)	3:49
9.	"Across The Great Steppe" (Skit)	1:09
10.	"The Horde"	4:30
11.	"What's It Gonna Take?" (featuring Stubhy)	3:14
12.	"Words" (additional vocals by Bard)	2:11
13.	"Legendary" (featuring Twista & AK of Do Or Die)	4:39
14.	"Let The Trumpets Blow" (featuring Young Zee)	4:20
15.	"Masterpiece Verses" (additional vocals by Bard)	4:02
16.	"Absolute Silence" (featuring Dan Guzman)	2:56
Total length:		55:37

=== Extended plays ===
- 2006 - Skeletal Thesaurus
