= Folkesange =

Studio album by Myrkur
- Released: 20 March 2020
- Genre: Folk music; Scandinavian traditional music
- Length: 46:53
- Language: Danish, English, Old Norse
- Label: Relapse
- Producer: Christopher Juul

Myrkur chronology
Mareridt (2017)	Folkesange (2020)

Singles from Folkesange
- 1. "Ella" Released: 14 January 2020; 2. "Leaves of Yggdrasil" Released: 11 February 2020; 3. "Gudernes Vilje" Released: 3 March 2020

Professional ratings
Aggregate scores
Source	Rating
Metacritic	75/100
Review scores
Source	Rating
AllMusic	4/5 stars
Exclaim!	8/10
The Guardian	3/5 stars
Kerrang!	3/5 stars
Metal Storm	8.7/10

Folkesange (Danish: "folk songs") is the third studio album by Danish band Myrkur, led by singer Amalie Bruun. It was released on 20 March 2020 under Relapse Records. Folkesange diverts from the style of the band's previous black metal albums into folk music. The album consists of renditions of Scandinavian traditional music performed with period instruments such as mandola, lyre, nyckelharpa and talharpa as well as of original acoustic compositions.

The first single from the album, "Ella", was released on 14 January 2020.

== Critical reception ==
Folkesange was met with generally favorable reviews from critics. At Metacritic, which assigns a weighted average rating out of 100 to reviews from mainstream publications, this release received an average score of 75, based on 6 reviews. Metal Hammer named it the 50th best metal album of 2020.

== Track listing ==
Folkesange track listing
No.	Title	Length
1.	"Ella"	3:54
2.	"Fager som en Ros"	2:50
3.	"Leaves of Yggdrasil"	4:00
4.	"Ramund"	3:28
5.	"Tor i Helheim"	7:10
6.	"Svea"	3:26
7.	"Harpens Kraft"	3:19
8.	"Gammelkäring"	3:28
9.	"House Carpenter"	3:38
10.	"Reiar"	3:46
11.	"Gudernes Vilje"	3:56
12.	"Vinter"	3:58
Total length:		46:53

== Charts ==
Chart performance for Folkesange
Chart (2020)	Peak position
German Albums (Offizielle Top 100)	20
Scottish Albums (OCC)	23
Swiss Albums (Schweizer Hitparade)	18
UK Independent Albums (OCC)	7
US Americana/Folk Albums (Billboard)	27
US World Albums (Billboard)	4
US Top Album Sales (Billboard)	27
