= Myrkur =

Danish dark folk/black metal band

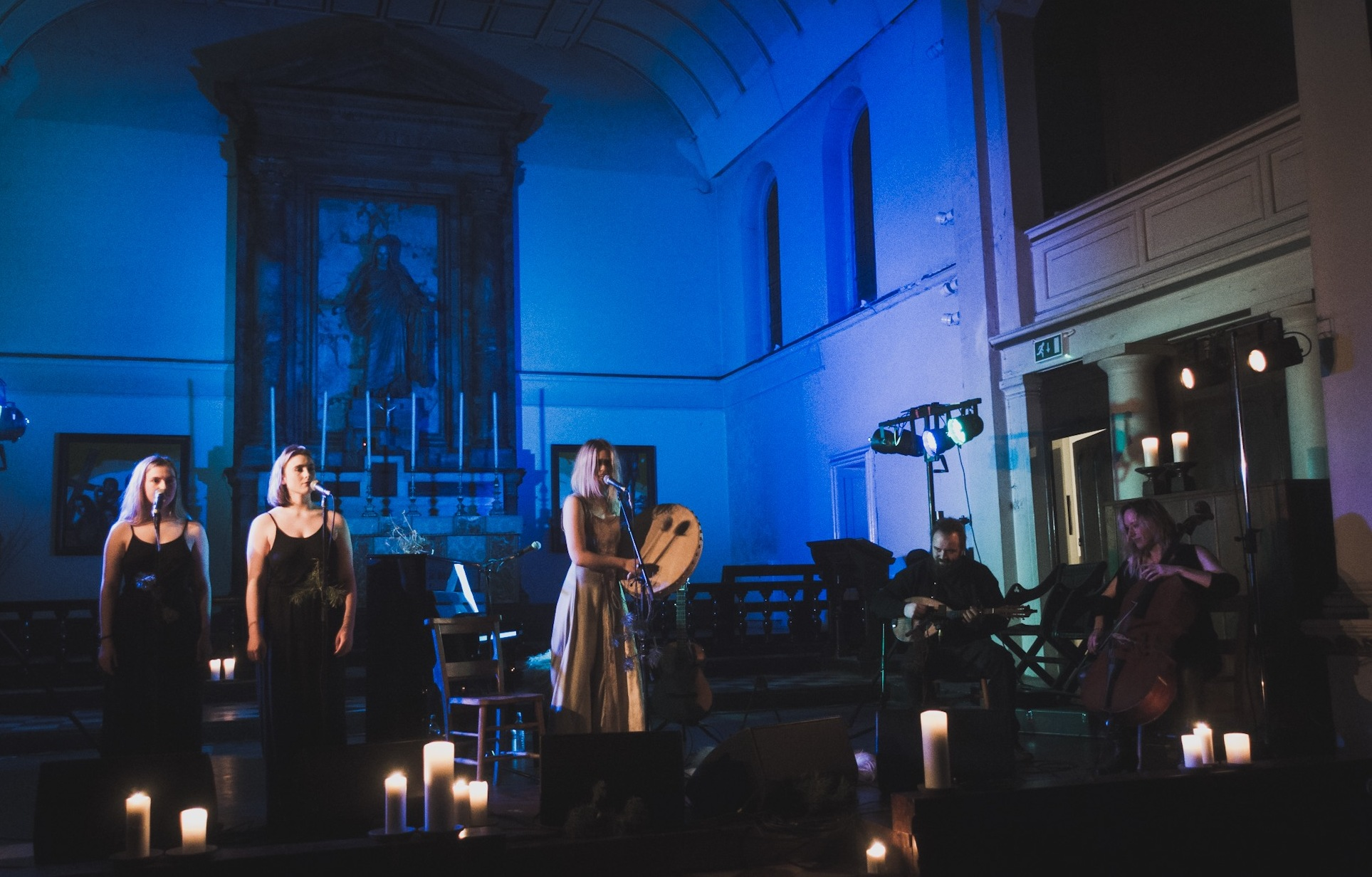
- Myrkur performing live in 2018

Background information
- Origin: Copenhagen, Denmark
- Genres: Folk rock, black metal, blackgaze, gothic metal
- Years active: 2014–present
- Label: Relapse
- Spinoff of: Ex Cops
- Members: Amalie Bruun
- Website: myrkurmusic.band

Myrkur is a musical project led by Danish singer Amalie Bruun which combines folk rock and black metal. Initially, the real-life identity of the person behind the project was not disclosed but Bruun’s name has since been revealed. Myrkur has released four full-length studio albums to significant critical acclaim, as well as a live album and two EP. Her most recent album, Spine, was released on 20 October 2023 through Relapse Records.

The name of the project comes from an Icelandic (and Faroese) word meaning "darkness." The musical influences of Myrkur range from traditional Scandinavian folk to the black metal genre. New releases from Myrkur have tended towards embracing folk music traditions, with Bruun's 2020 album Folkesange being overwhelming folk-inspired and lacking the black metal sound that characterized the artist's earlier releases. Folkesange contains narrative "story-songs" performed on instruments appropriate to the ancient pagan folk music that Bruun included within the album, alongside modern original compositions as well.

== History ==
Bruun formed the project and signed to Relapse Records in 2014. On September 16 that same year, Myrkur debuted with a self-titled EP on which Bruun provided the vocals, played all guitars and bass and produced the album. Drums were performed by her friend Rex Myrnur. In June 2015, Myrkur announced the release of her debut full-length album, entitled M, which was released on 21 August 2015 via Relapse Records to critical acclaim. The album was produced by Kristoffer Rygg of Ulver, and featured Teloch of Mayhem and Nidingr on guitars, with Øyvind Myrvoll of Nidingr and Dodheimsgard on drums. In August 2016, she released a live album titled Mausoleum, which was recorded at the Emanuel Vigeland Mausoleum in Oslo, Norway. The album featured acoustic and choral reinterpretations of her previously released material with the assistance of the Norwegian Girls Choir and Håvard Jørgensen, former guitarist in Ulver. Her second full-length album, Mareridt, was released on 15 September 2017. In 2018, the album won the non-fan voted "Album of the Year" award at Metal Hammer's Golden Gods Awards. Her album Folkesange was released on 20 March 2020.

== Members ==
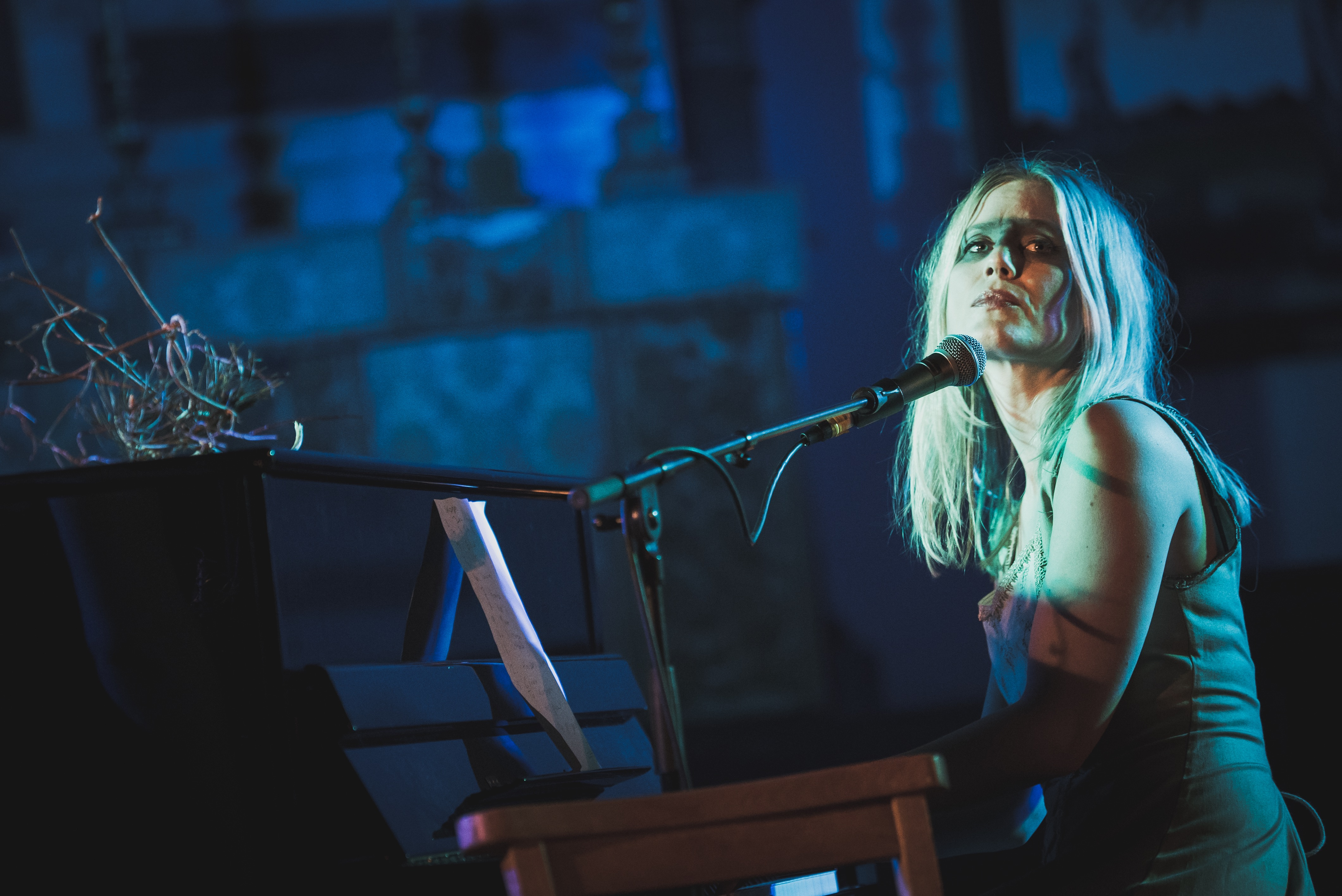
Bruun performing with Myrkur in 2018

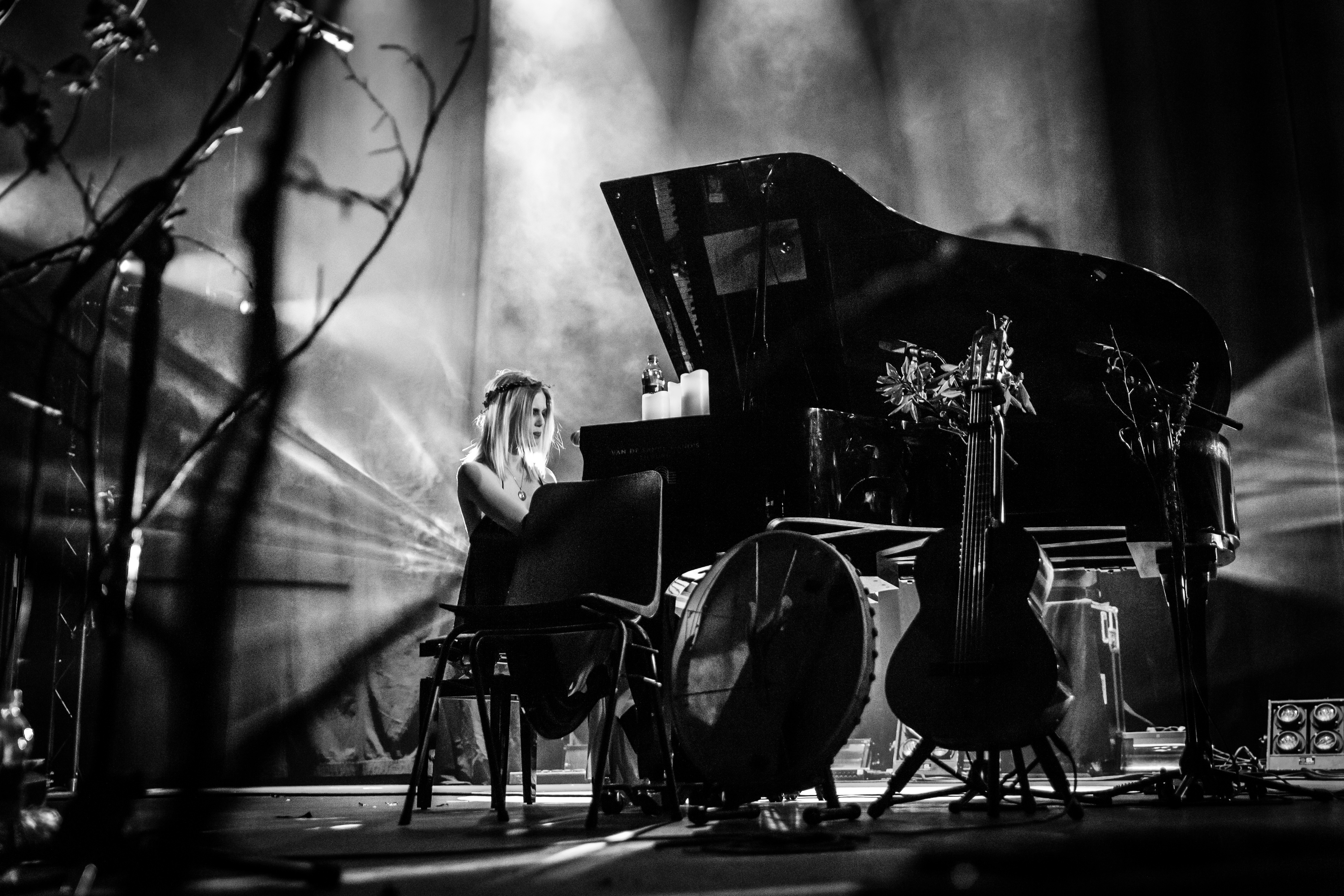
Bruun in 2019

Current

- Amalie Bruun – vocals, guitars, bass, keyboards, piano, organ, violin, nyckelharpa, percussion (2014–present)

Live members

- Jaime Díaz Otero Núñez – drums (2018–present)
- Maja Shining – bass/backing vocals/synth (2020–present)
- Mikkel Haastrup – guitar (2023–present)

Former session/live musicians

- Jeppe Skouv – bass (2016–)
- Andreas Lynge – guitars (2016–)
- Martin Haumann – drums (2017–)
- Alejandro Romero Pérez – bass (2018–2019)
- Edgar Merigó Trens – guitars (2018–2019)

== Discography ==
=== Studio albums ===
- M (2015)
- Mareridt (2017)
- Folkesange (2020)
- Spine (2023)

=== Soundtracks ===
- Ragnarok (2023)

=== Live albums ===
- Mausoleum (2016)

=== EPs ===
- Myrkur (2014)
- Juniper (2018)

=== Singles ===
- "Nattens Barn" (2014)
- "Skaði" (Demo) (2014)
- "Onde Børn" (2015)
- "Den Lille Piges Død" (2015)
- "Jeg er guden, I er tjenerne" (2016)
- "Två Konungabarn" (2017)
- "Måneblôt" (2017)
- "Ulvinde" (2017)
- "Shadows of Silence" (2017)
- "De tre piker" (2017)
- "Juniper" (2018)
- "Bonden og Kragen" (2018)
- "Ella" (2020)
- "Leaves of Yggdrasil" (2020)
- "Gudernes Vilje" (2020)
- "Dronning Ellisiv" (2020)
- "Rivers Blessed" (Demo) (2021)
- "Like Humans" (2023)
- "Mothlike" (2023)
- "Valkyriernes Sang" (2023)
- "Touch My Love And Die" (2026)
