= Ivar Fløistad =

Norwegian politician (1846–1926)

Ivar Guttormsen Fløistad (4 December 1846 – 26 November 1926) was a Norwegian bailiff and politician for the Liberal Party.

He was elected to the Parliament of Norway in 1885 from the constituency Nedenes Amt, and after many years he was elected again in 1897. He previously served as a deputy representative during the term 1883–1885. When new constituencies had been introduced, he ran in 1906 in Nedenes. Against seven other candidates he received 274 votes and won the first round. Finn Blakstad in second place had 249, followed by Aslak Kateraas with 229, Lars Olsen Skjulestad with 175 and Daniel Vigeland with 119. In the second round, Blakstad (with Kateraas as running mate) won with 639 votes against Fløistad's 586 (with Vigeland as running mate). In the 1909 election Fløistad ran again, but finished third in both the first and second round, and was not elected.

He died in late December 1958 and was buried in Austre Moland Municipality. He was the father of politician Guttorm Fløistad and grandfather of philosopher Guttorm Fløistad.
