= Mr. Green (music producer) =

- Born: Aaron Green
- Origin: Highland Park, New Jersey, U.S.
- Genres: Instrumental hip hop, underground hip hop
- Occupations: Record producer, DJ
- Years active: 2006–present
- Labels: Green Music Group, Live from the Streets Productions

Aaron Green, known professionally as Mr. Green, is an American record producer and DJ from Highland Park, New Jersey, United States. He has a very unconventional and highly textured sonic style. He has produced dozens of songs that reached the Billboard charts, including number one hit records. He produces viral songs such as "If I Don't Go to Hell", which received over a billion views on TikTok.

== Career ==
Since 2007, Green has released his instrumental albums, including his Classic Beats series. So far, he has released 11 "Classic Beats" albums, the fifth edition featuring DJ Kool Herc.

Mr. Green and Sam Lipman-Stern's web series "Live from the Streets" has been picked up by Vice. In 2015, Green compiled the songs from the series onto the album with the same name. He links up with The Roots rapper Malik B for their collaborative LP Unpredictable, and the Roots used his video "Live from the Bedroom" to celebrate their debut episode of The Tonight Show starring Jimmy Fallon.

In 2018, Green collaborated on the EP FLYGOD Is Good... All the Time, with Westside Gunn. He also released over a dozen limited edition 7" vinyl records. In 2019, Mr. Green collaborated with Lee "Scratch" Perry on the EP "Super Ape Vs. 緑: Open Door", featuring Eric Andre, Sheek Louch, Daniel Son and HR. In 2020, a ninja project began, loosely based around the cut and paste movies of the 1980s, the first single featured Gucci Mane entitled "Gucci Ninja Assassins". A second single was announced featuring Rick Ross, "Golden Ninja Empire (Yayo Ninjas)". The third and fourth singles were "Gucci Ninja Assassins 2: in the Metal Garden of Fire" feat. Gucci Mane and Supreme Ninja Training Montage feat. DMX. On Green's 27th birthday on June 29, 2021, a fifth ninja single feat. Lil Wayne was also released. HotNewHipHop.com compared Mr. Greens inventive work to that of RZA from Wu Tang Clan. In August 2021, a sixth single featuring Jadakiss was also announced. In 2022, he released a single with Dolly White from YSL Records. In 2023, Mr. Green produced two tracks on Westside Gunn's And Then You Pray for Me. In 2025 Mr. Green produced the intro track for 3 Westside Gunn projects: 12, Heels Have Eyes 1 and Heels Have Eyes 2.

== Tv, Film and Video Games ==
In addition to his own show, Mr. Green has contributed to several well known projects. He appeared in the arcade scene of the Safdie Brothers Good Time. He also acted as composer on an illegal civilization series featuring Mikey Alfred as well as the J Cole episode of BETs rising Icons featuring Jay Z. In 2023, he created an original theme song for the Disney x Tommy Hilfiger collaboration "Manga Mickey", celebrating 100 years of Disney. In 2025 his song "Dolla Bill" featuring Malik B was featuring on MLB the show '25 by Sony PlayStation.

== Discography ==
=== Instrumental albums ===
- 2007 – Green Future
- 2009 – Classic Beats Vol. 1
- 2009 – Classic Beats Vol. 2
- 2011 – Classic Beats Vol. 3
- 2013 – Classic Beats Vol. 4: Ill Piano
- 2014 – One Day EP
- 2016 – The Project
- 2018 – The Last of the Classic Beats (narrated by Kool Herc) Volume 5

=== Collaboration albums ===
- 2008 – The Only Color That Matters Is Green (with Pace Won)
- 2012 – One Crazy Weekend (with Young Zee)
- 2012 – The Only Number That Matters Is Won (with Pace Won)
- 2015 – Unpredictable (with Malik B)
- 2018 – FLYGOD is Good... All the Time (with Westside Gunn)
- 2020 – "Gucci Ninja Assassins" 7 inch vinyl (with Gucci Mane)
- 2020 – "Golden Ninja Empire (Yayo Ninjas)" 7 inch vinyl (with Rick Ross)
- 2021 – "Gucci Ninja Assassins 2: In the Metal Garden of Fire" 7 inch vinyl (with Gucci Mane and Garden of Fire)

=== Compilation albums ===
- 2015 – Live from the Streets
