= Daniel Vigeland =

Norwegian farmer and politician

Daniel Andersen Vigeland (29 December 1847 – 24 June 1927) was a Norwegian farmer and politician for the Liberal Party.

He was elected to the Parliament of Norway in 1897 from the constituency Nedenes Amt, and was re-elected in 1900. When new constituencies had been introduced, he ran in 1906 in Nedenes as one of eight candidates. He finished fifth in the first round with 119 votes, behind Ivar Fløistad, Finn Blakstad, Aslak Kateraas and Lars Olsen Skjulestad. In the second round he ran as the running mate of Fløistad, but they lost to the duo Blakstad/Kateraas. In the 1912 election Vigeland ran as the Liberal candidate in a much smaller field. He managed to carry Gjøvdal Municipality and Lille Topdal Municipality in the first round, but fared worse in the more urbanized districts and finished third in both rounds.
