= I'm Leavin' (Outsidaz song) =

2002 single by Outsidaz

Single by Outsidaz featuring Kelis (album version)/Melanie Blatt (single version) & Rah Digga

from the album The Bricks
- Released: March 2002
- Genre: Hip hop
- Length: 3:40
- Label: Ruffhouse
- Songwriter(s): Stuart Zender, Melanie Blatt

"I'm Leavin'" is a song by Outsidaz featuring Rah Digga and Melanie Blatt, which was released as a single in March 2002 in the United Kingdom and Europe. Kelis is the featured on the album version, but on the single and video a collaboration is done with Melanie.

== Track list ==
CD 1
1.	I'm Leavin' (clean edit)	3.40
2.	I'm Leavin' (full length clean)	4.20
3.	I'm Leavin' (Grunge Boyz vocal dub remix)	4.59
4.	I'm Leavin' (Oddsmakers remix clean)	4.48

== Charts ==
Chart (2002)	Peak position
UK Indie (OCC)	6
UK Hip Hop/R&B (OCC)	9
UK Singles (OCC)	41

== Video ==
The I'm Leavin' video was shot in a New Jersey ghetto.

== Remixes ==
I'm Leavin'

- Clean edit
- Full length clean
- Grunge Boyz vocal dub remix
- Oddsmakers remix – clean
