= Young Zee =

American hip hop emcee

- Born: Dewayne Battle; December 24, 1970 (age 55)
- Origin: Newark, New Jersey, U.S.
- Genres: East Coast hip hop; hardcore hip hop; underground hip hop; battle rap
- Occupations: Rapper; songwriter; producer
- Years active: 1991–present
- Labels: Perspective; Ruffhouse; Runyon Ave; Ruff Cutz
- Formerly of: Outsidaz

Dewayne Battle (born December 24, 1970), known professionally as Young Zee, is an American underground hip hop emcee. He is a member of the Outsidaz, alongside Pacewon and Rah Digga.

== Career ==
=== Outsidaz ===
The Outsidaz, a large hip hop crew that became the first act signed to Ruff Life Records, produced several singles and released a record in the mid-'90s. The group including Young Zee had guest vocals on the Fugees' song "Cowboys" in 1996. Zee made an appearance on Rah Digga's first solo album in 1999. The group released Night Life (2000) and The Bricks (2001). In 2002 his solo track, "That's My Nigga fo' Real", was included on the hit soundtrack to Eminem's film 8 Mile.

=== Solo artist ===
Due to a history of collaboration, Zee and fans expected him to be signed to Eminem's Shady Records label under Aftermath/Interscope records, but instead he signed as a solo artist to D12 members Kuniva and Kon Artis' label Runyon Ave Records, but he made the only related appearance in "Commercial Break" on D12 World.

In 2005, Young Zee appeared on Casual's Smash Rockwell album. In 2009, he was featuring on Chicago rap duo Saurus and Bones's debut album Mind Like Mine. Zee collaborated with The Dirty Dozen on their 2011 mixtape Return Of The Dozen Vol. 2. Also in 2011, he performed on Jedi Mind Tricks's Violence Begets Violence album. In 2012, Young Zee and Mr. Green released One Crazy Weekend featuring former Outsidaz members.

== Personal life ==
He had a relationship with fellow rapper Rah Digga. The couple has a daughter named Sativa, born in 1997. Young Zee has a son, Krash Battle (born on September 9, 1992), who is also a rapper.

== Discography ==
- 1996: Musical Meltdown
- 2002: 8 Mile: Music from and Inspired by the Motion Picture
- 2009: Paranoia Archives
- 2009: The Album I Had When I Was Supposed to Sign to Shady!
- 2012: One Crazy Weekend (with Mr. Green)
- 2022: Around the World (Risskant and Sythe)
- 2022: Scumbag EP
- 2023: Skarekrow LP
- 2023: Da Bros LP
- 2024: Fat & Skinny (with Bizarre & Foul Mouth)
