= The Only Color That Matters Is Green =

Studio album by Pace Won & Mr. Green
- Released: June 20, 2008
- Recorded: 2008
- Studio: Mr. Green's Crib; Studio 56 (Hollywood, California)
- Genre: Underground hip hop
- Length: 50:20
- Label: Raw Poetix
- Producer: Mr. Green

Pace Won & Mr. Green chronology
The Only Color That Matters Is Green (2008)	The Only Number That Matters Is Won (2012)

Singles from The Only Color That Matters Is Green
- 1. "Children Sing" Released: 2008

The Only Color That Matters Is Green is the first collaborative studio album by American emcee/producer duo Pace Won and Mr. Green. It was released on June 20, 2008, by Raw Poetix Records LLC. The album features guest appearances from Mary Lou, Cymarshall Law & KoshaDillz.

It was supported by two music videos, "Children Sing" and "Who I Am".

== Critical reception ==
The Only Color That Matters Is Green received positive reviews from critics. HipHopDX puts the album in their "The Top 25 Hip Hop Albums Of 2008" with rating 4.5/5.

Professional ratings
Review scores
Source	Rating
HipHopDX	4.5/5 stars
RapReviews	8/10 stars

== Track listing ==
No.	Title	Length
1.	"Four Quarters"	5:27
2.	"Children Sing"	5:06
3.	"The Eye Of A Needle"	3:58
4.	"I Need Money"	4:34
5.	"Let A Shot Go"	4:25
6.	"Who I Am"	3:13
7.	"Hip Hop"	4:13
8.	"Childhood" (featuring Cymarshall Law, Kosha Dillz & Mary Lou)	3:31
9.	"So Straight"	4:09
10.	"Won On Won"	4:05
11.	"She Can Be So Cold"	3:41
12.	"The Joker"	3:57
Total length:		50:20

== Personnel ==
- Aaron Green – producer, mixing, recording (tracks 1–3, 7–12)
- Christopher Mir – layout, design
- Cymar Simmons – guest artist (track 8)
- Hans Dekline – mastering
- Jenz Cypher – recording (tracks 4–6)
- Jerome Derek Hinds Jr. – main performer
- Mary Lou – guest artist (track 8)
- Rami Matan Even-Esh – guest artist (track 8)
