= Guttorm Fløistad (politician) =

Norwegian politician (1878–1953)

Guttorm Fløistad (28 May 1878 – 22 July 1953) was a Norwegian farmer, bailiff and politician for the Labour, Social Democratic Labour and Conservative parties.

== Early career and local politics ==
He was born at Østre Moland Municipality as a son of bailiff and politician Ivar Guttormsen Fløistad (1846–1926) and Ingeborg Herveland (1844–1939). After finishing folk high school in 1896 and agricultural school in 1897, he was a farmer at Mørfjær in Stokken from 1900 to 1923 and the family farm Fløistad in Østre Moland from 1923. He was also a bailiff in Stokken from 1902, and from 1921 he doubled as bailiff of Austre Moland too. He held the bailiff position until 1948, except for the years 1943–1945 during the occupation of Norway by Nazi Germany.

He was a member of municipal council of Østre Moland Municipality and later Stokken Municipality from 1904 to 1923 and 1934 to 1940, serving as mayor of Stokken Municipality from 1919 to 1921. Stokken had been separated from Østre Moland as an independent municipality in 1919.

He was married to Gustava, born 1880. Through his oldest son Ivar, he was a grandfather of philosopher Guttorm Fløistad.

== National politics ==
He was elected to the Parliament of Norway in the 1912 election from the constituency Nedenes, and served a three-year term. In 1915 Fløistad won the first round of voting, with a tally of 1,747 against 1,267 votes for Liberal Aslak Kateraas (with a Gunnar Fløistad as running mate) and 1,196 for Conservative Lars Olsen Skjulestad. There was therefore a second round, and the bourgeois parties backed Kateraas to avoid re-election of Fløistad. Kateraas (now with Skjulestad as running mate) won with 2,887 votes against Fløistad's 2,181. Kateraas was a former mayor of Aamli Municipality, but Fløistad carried that district as well as Lille Topdal Municipality and Froland Municipality—on the other hand, Kateraas carried Fløistad's home district Østre Moland as well as Gjøvdal Municipality, Tromø Municipality, Hisø Municipality, and Øiestad Municipality. The same thing happened in 1918. Fløistad won the second round with 1,843 votes against 1,444 for Skjulestad and 1,370 for Kateraas. Fløistad now faced Skjulestad in the run-off, and lost with 1,688 against 2,340. It was not enough for Fløistad to carry Aamli as well as Østre Moland.

In 1919 Fløistad signed a communique that preceded the founding of a splinter party from Labour, the Social Democratic Labour Party. In the 1921 election, plural-member constituencies had been introduced and Fløistad headed the Social Democratic ballot for Aust-Agder. Gunnar Fløistad was now an Agrarian. Neither were elected. Many years later he served as a deputy representative during the term 1945–1949, but this time for the Conservative Party. In the 1949 election he was promoted to head the Conservative Party ballot for Aust-Agder, but Labour swept three of four seats with the last going to the Liberals. The Conservatives were outrun by the Agrarian Party too. Fløistad died in July 1953, some months before the next parliamentary election.

Fløistad was a board member of the trade union Norges lensmannslag, and chaired it locally in Aust-Agder from 1924 to 1939 and 1946 to 1948. Upon retiring here he became an honorary member. He also chaired Arendals Meieri (1930–1947, board member since 1907), Aust-Agder Melkecentral (1931–1948) and Aust-Agder Kraftverk (1942–1952, board member since 1934) and was a board member of Nedenes Sparebank (1927–1953), Arendal Museum (1933–1952) and Vestlandske Tidende. In 1947 he was decorated with the King's Medal of Merit in gold.
