= Emanuel Vigeland =

Norwegian artist

Emanuel Vigeland (2 December 1875 – 22 December 1948) was a multitalented Norwegian artist. He is known for a variety of decorations of Scandinavian churches and for Tomba Emmanuelle, his mausoleum at Slemdal in Oslo. His elder brother was sculptor, Gustav Vigeland.

== Background ==
August Emanuel Vigeland was born in Halsaa og Hartmark Municipality near the town of Mandal in Lister og Mandal county. Vigeland was born to a family of craftsmen. His parents were Elesæus Thorsen (1835–1886), a cabinetmaker and Anne Aanensdatter (1835–1907). In autumn 1894, he went to Oslo as a student at the Norwegian National Academy. In the spring of 1897 he debuted at the National art exhibition. Vigeland went to Copenhagen in the autumn of 1898 and was a student of Peder Severin Krøyer at Den Frie Studieskole. From October 1899 to February 1902, Vigeland stayed abroad, first as a student in Paris, then in Italy, Spain, and the UK.

== Career ==
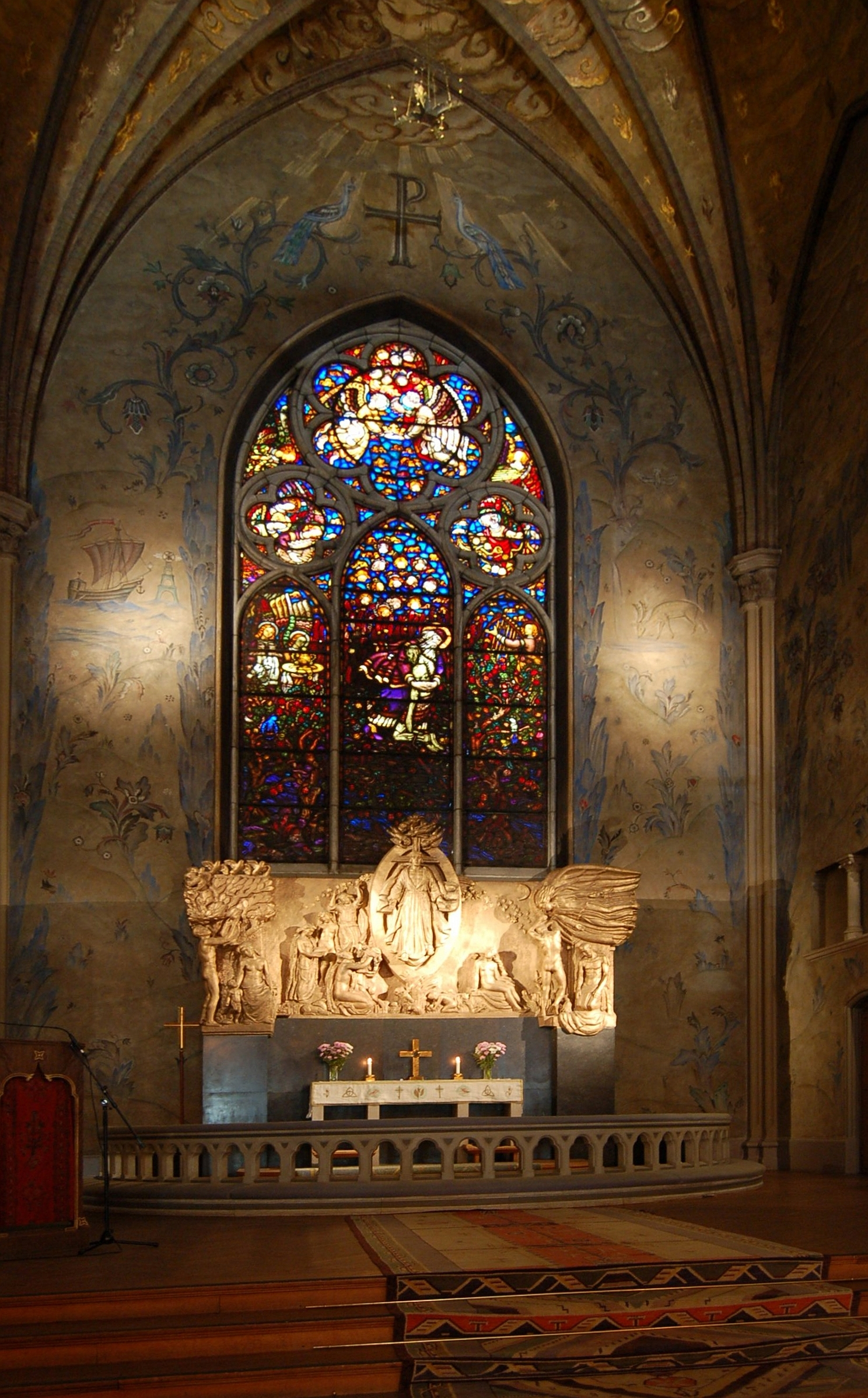
Stained glass above altar in Oscar's Church

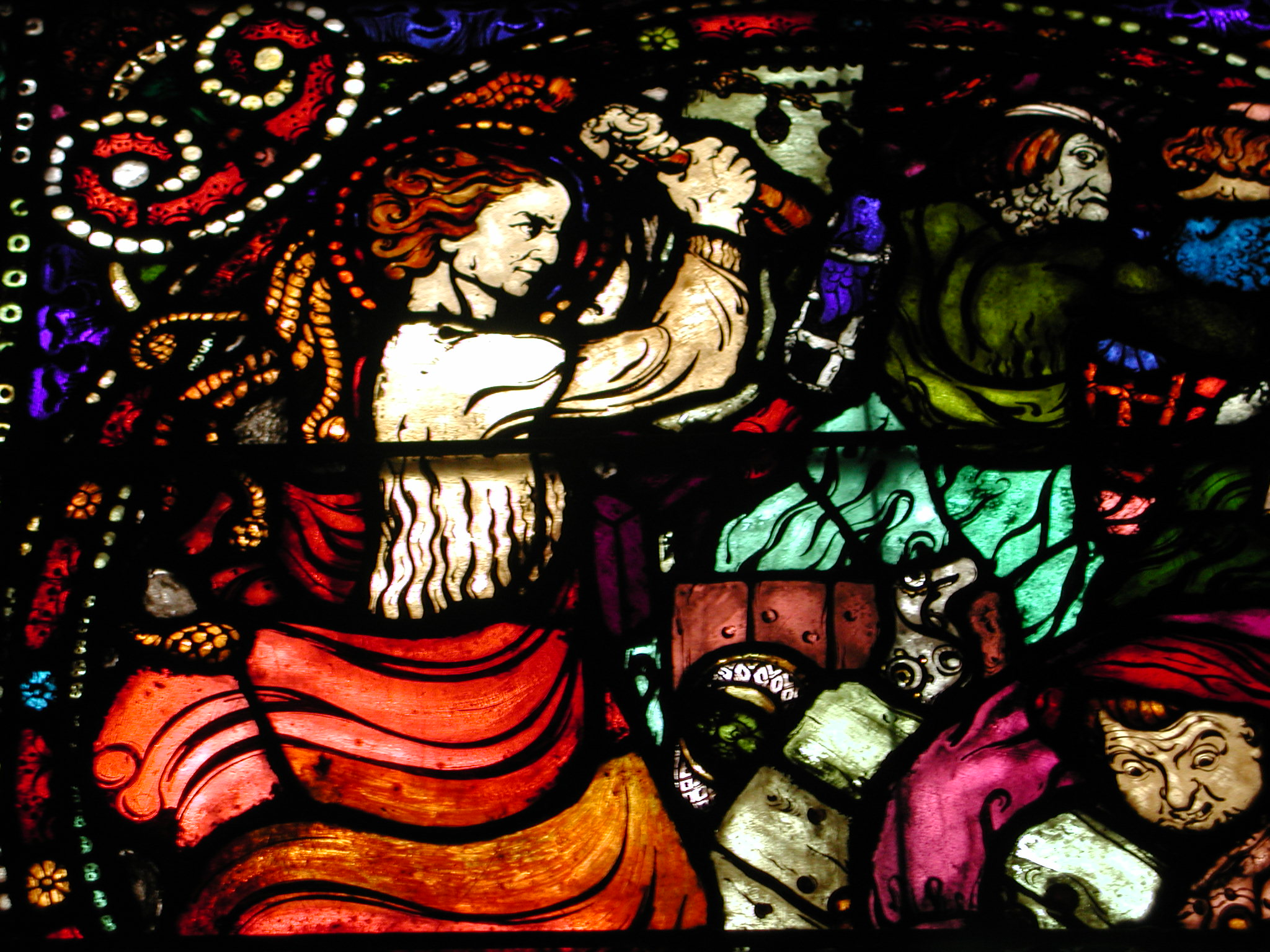
Detail from stained glass in Oslo Cathedral depicting Jesus overturning the tables of the money-changers in the Temple

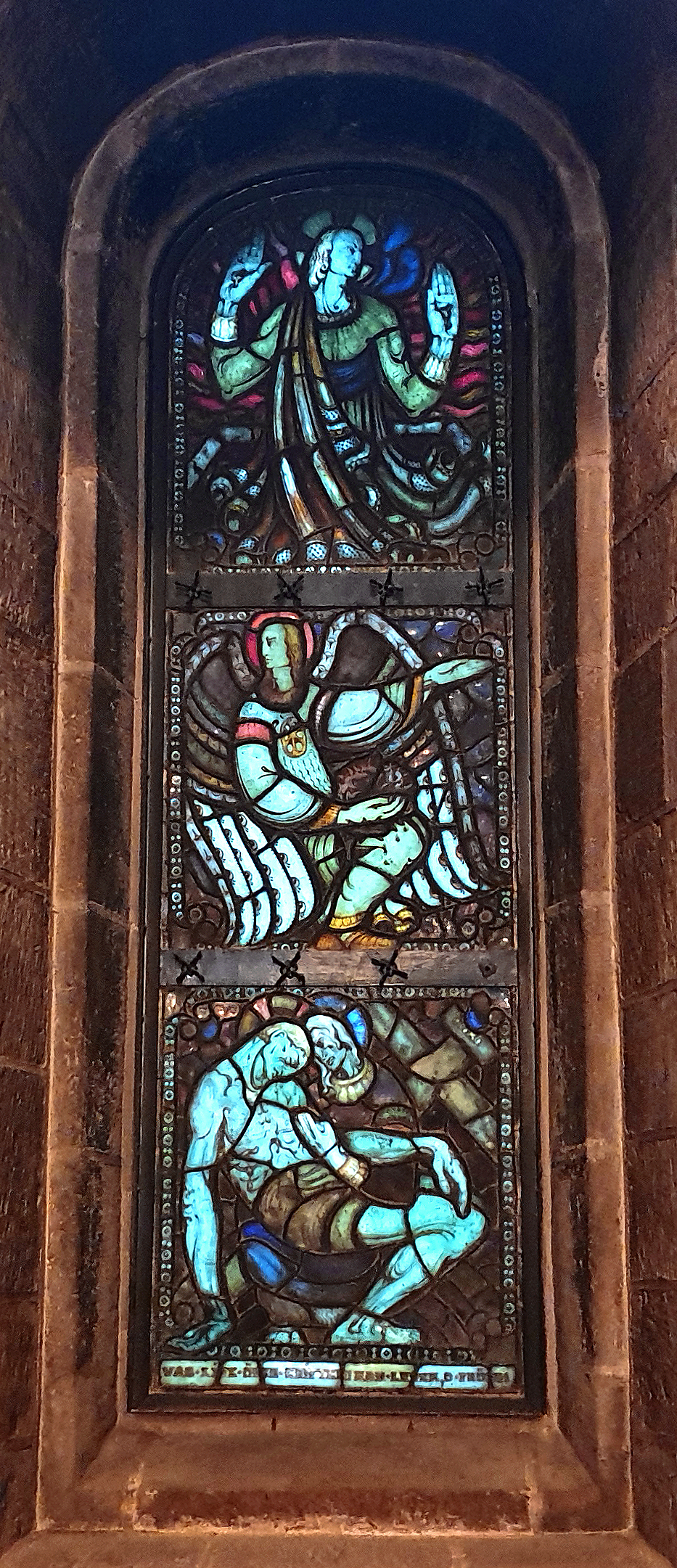
Stained glass, Lund Cathedral. Vigeland 1930.

His first solo exhibition was held at the Dioramalokalet on Karl Johan Street in Oslo during February 1902. In 1905, Vigeland traveled to Italy under a scholarship to study frescoes, a journey that also took him to Egypt and Jerusalem. In 1909, Vigeland was commissioned to decorate frescoes, stained glass and lighting equipment for the first Norwegian Crematorium (Det gamle kapell). The same year he was invited to participate in the competition for the decoration of fresco paintings and stained glass in the new assembly hall at the University of Oslo.

Mostly known for his paintings, Vigeland also produced frescos, stained glass and sculptures. Noteworthy sculptures include The Virgin and the Unicorn, installed in Nygårdsparken in Bergen. Many of his designs are inspired by Christianity, and he decorated the interior of a number of churches principally in Norway. Noteworthy were the design of the interiors, from the pulpit and altar to light fixtures and other decor, in Bryn Church in Bærum, (1911–14) and the mosaics and stained glass at Gjerpen Church at Skien (1919–21). Other notable example would include the chandeliers and wall lamps in the choir and the ship in the Stavanger Cathedral, the stained glass in the Århus Cathedral, the stained glass in Lund Cathedral and stained glass of Fredrikstad Cathedral in the Diocese of Borg.

From 1919-22, he ran a school for stained glass art at his studio at Slemdal. In the 1920s he was at the height of his fame, having conducted a series of successful missions abroad. Vigeland was acquainted with Swedish archbishop Nathan Söderblom and through this connection he was introduced to the Swedish People's Church Movement. Particularly extensive and prestigious was his work with glass paintings at Oscar's Church in Stockholm.

== Tomba Emmanuelle ==
Vigeland made of his mausoleum (Tomba Emmanuelle) his magnum opus. His mausoleum, which doubles as a museum, is located in Oslo. It is shaped like a small windowless church, which has overwhelming acoustics that make speaking out loud almost impossible. The inside walls and roof are covered in a giant fresco, Vita, depicting human life, love and death. Several sculptures of women giving birth adorn the floor. The entry to the mausoleum is very low and the urn containing the ashes of the artist is in a niche above the entry, thus forcing all visitors to bow to him when exiting. It is rumoured that Emanuel was annoyed by always being in the shadow of his better known brother Gustav Vigeland and that this gesture of morbid humour was his posthumous revenge.

In 1958, the mausoleum was opened to the public. It is run by the private foundation Emanuel Vigeland Museum. The amazing acoustics of the mausoleum can be heard in recordings by various artists:

- American folk artist Jay Brannan, who was allowed a private visit during which he was videotaped singing his composition, Death Waltz.
- Swedish/German group Mattimatti
- Danish black metal musician Myrkur, who recorded the live acoustic album Mausoleum (2016) there, featuring The Norwegian Girls Choir.
- Inuk throat singer Tanya Tagaq filmed the music video for her song Aorta inside Tomba Emmanuelle.
- Norwegian traditional singer Unni Løvlid – Vita, a solo vocal recording, Helio Records, 2005
- South Korean composer Okkyung Lee, solo performance on cello, Pica Disk, 2018
- vocal ensemble Kristin Bolstad + Stemmeklang, a cappella recording, 2L Records, 2019

== Personal life ==
In 1902, Emanuel Vigeland married Valborg Kristine Madsen (1879–1951). Their children were Maria Vigeland (1903–1983), Per Vigeland (1904–1968), and Imm Vigeland (1917-2004).

He was a grandfather of goldsmith Tone Vigeland.
