= Night Life (Outsidaz EP) =

Night Life EP

EP by Outsidaz
- Released: January 18, 2000
- Recorded: 1998–1999
- Genre: East Coast hip hop; hardcore rap
- Length: 28:35
- Label: Ruffhouse
- Producer: Chris Schwartz (exec.); Az Izz; Jim Jonsin; Pace Won; Rah Digga; Young Zee

Outsidaz chronology
Night Life EP (2000)	The Bricks (2001)

Professional ratings
Review scores
Source	Rating
AllMusic	2.5/5 stars
The Source	3/5 stars

Night Life is the debut EP by American New Jersey–based rap group the Outsidaz. It was released on January 18, 2000, via Rufflife Records. Audio production of the seven-track record was handled by Jim Jonsin, Ski, and few members of the band, with Chris Schwartz served as executive producer.

The album peaked at No. 67 on the Billboard Top R&B/Hip-Hop Albums chart and No. 19 on the Top Heatseekers chart. "The Rah Rah" was the lone single released from the album.

The record was dedicated to Outsidaz member Slang Ton who died in 1999.

== Track listing ==
No.	Title	Producer(s)	Length
1.	"Don't Look Now"	Ski	3:25
2.	"The Rah Rah"	Ski	4:21
3.	"Fuck Y'all Niggaz"	Az Izz; Young Zee (co.); Rah Digga (co.)	3:11
4.	"Rush Ya Clique" (featuring Eminem)	Az Izz	4:30
5.	"Money, Money, Money"	Az Izz; Jim Jonsin (co.)	4:06
6.	"It's Goin' Down"	Pace Won	4:30
7.	"Night Life"	Jim Jonsin	4:27
Total length:			28:35

== Personnel ==
Vocals

- Tyree Smith (Axe) – rap (tracks 1, 4–7)
- Aubrey King (Az Izz) – rap (tracks 4–5, 7)
- Brian Bostic (D.U.) – rap (tracks 5, 7)
- Denton Dawes (Denzy) – rap (tracks 5, 7)
- Marshall Mathers (Eminem) – rap (track 4)
- Nathaniel Longchamp (Nawshis) – rap (tracks 5, 7)
- Jerome Hinds (PaceWon) – rap (tracks 1–2, 4, 6–7)
- Rashia Fisher (Rah Digga) – rap (track 3)
- Salih Ibn Al Bayyinah Scaife (Slang Ton) – rap (track 4)
- Shakir Nur-al-din Abdullah (Yah Yah) – rap (tracks 6–7)
- Dewayne Battle (Young Zee) – rap (tracks 1–4, 5, 3–7)
- Vincent Carroll – additional vocals (track 5)

Technical credits

- Chris Schwartz – executive producer
- David Anthony Willis – producer
- Eric "Ibo" Butler – recording
- Ian Cross – mixing
- James Schaffer – mixing, recording, producer
- Jim Bottari – engineer
- Ken Johnson – recording
- Mike Goodchild – mixing, recording
- Peter Jorge – mixing, recording
- Warren Riker – mixing

== Charts ==
Chart (2000)	Peak position
US Top R&B/Hip-Hop Albums (Billboard)	67
US Independent Albums (Billboard)	15
US Heatseekers Albums (Billboard)	19
