= Nidingr (band) =

Norwegian black metal band

- Also known as: Audr (1992–1996)
- Origin: Borre, Norway
- Genres: Black metal; death metal
- Years active: 1992–present
- Labels: Karisma; Jester
- Members: Teloch; Blargh; Øyvind Myrvoll; Cpt. Estrella Grasa; Sir
- Past members: Per Ivar Ederklepp; Tjalve; Walter Moen; Seidemann; Tony Laureano; Hellhammer
- Website: www.nidingr.no

Nidingr is a Norwegian black metal band from Borre. Initially started as a solo project of guitarist Morten "Teloch" Iversen under the name Audr in 1992, the band is "known for its efficiently complex songwriting, ravaging, dissonant, with catchy riffs and breakneck tempos".

== History ==
In 1996, Audr changed its name to Nidingr and recorded a rehearsal tape after Blargh joined the band. The band released a demo in 1999 and their debut album, Sorrow Infinite and Darkness in 2005. The 1996 rehearsal tape was included in 2006 compilation album, Sodomize the Priest. The band's next release, Wolf-Father (2010), featured contributions from Mayhem and Dimmu Borgir drummer Hellhammer. In 2012, the band signed to Norwegian record label Indie Recordings, which released their album Greatest of Deceivers.

The band leader Teloch is currently the guitarist of Mayhem and the live band of Myrkur. He was previously involved in various acts of early Norwegian black metal scene and was a member of the bands such as 1349, God Seed, Gorgoroth, Orcustus and Ov Hell. The band also featured many members involved in these bands, as well as Dødheimsgard.

== Musical style ==
The band plays a complex variant of black and death metal. The band's album, Greatest of Deceivers, included blackened death metal and crust punk tracks, as well as the tracks that feature "complicated leads and tricky time signatures that hint to mathcore and jazz." Miles Raymer of Pitchfork also noted that "in terms of compositional ambition the songs are closer to the labyrinthine post-rock and post-hardcore bands of the mid to late 90s than the savagely straightforward black metal outfits that were operating around the same time."

== Members ==
Current members

- Teloch — guitars, bass (1992—present)
- Blargh — guitars, bass (1996—present)
- Øyvind Myrvoll — drums
- Cpt. Estrella Grasa — vocals (2003—present)
- Sir — bass (2013—present)

Past members

- Per Ivar Ederklepp — drums
- Tjalve
- Walter Moen — vocals
- Seidemann — bass (2006—2007)
- Tony Laureano — drums (2006-2007)
- Hellhammer — drums

Current live members

- Void — bass
- Sabizz — drums (2013—present)

Former live members

- Audun Wiborg — bass

== Discography ==
Studio albums

- Sorrow Infinite and Darkness (2005)
- Wolf-Father (2010)
- Greatest of Deceivers (2012)
- The High Heat Licks Against Heaven (2017)

Demos

- Rehearsal 1996 (1996)
- Demo '99 (1999)

Compilation albums

- Sodomize the Priest (2006)
