= Guttorm Fløistad =

Norwegian philosopher (born 1930)

Guttorm Fløistad (born 5 December 1930) is a Norwegian philosopher.

He was born in Arendal as a son of sawmill owner Ivar Fløistad (1900–1974) and Thordis Renskaug (1905–1954). He is married to teacher Kirsten Kathrine Kaspersen. He is a grandson of politician Guttorm Fløistad and great-grandson of politician Ivar Guttormsen Fløistad.

He was a professor of the history of ideas at the University of Oslo from 1973 to his retirement. He has published on the philosophy of Baruch Spinoza and Martin Heidegger, and on applied philosophy.
