= Maria Vigeland =

Norwegian painter and sculptor

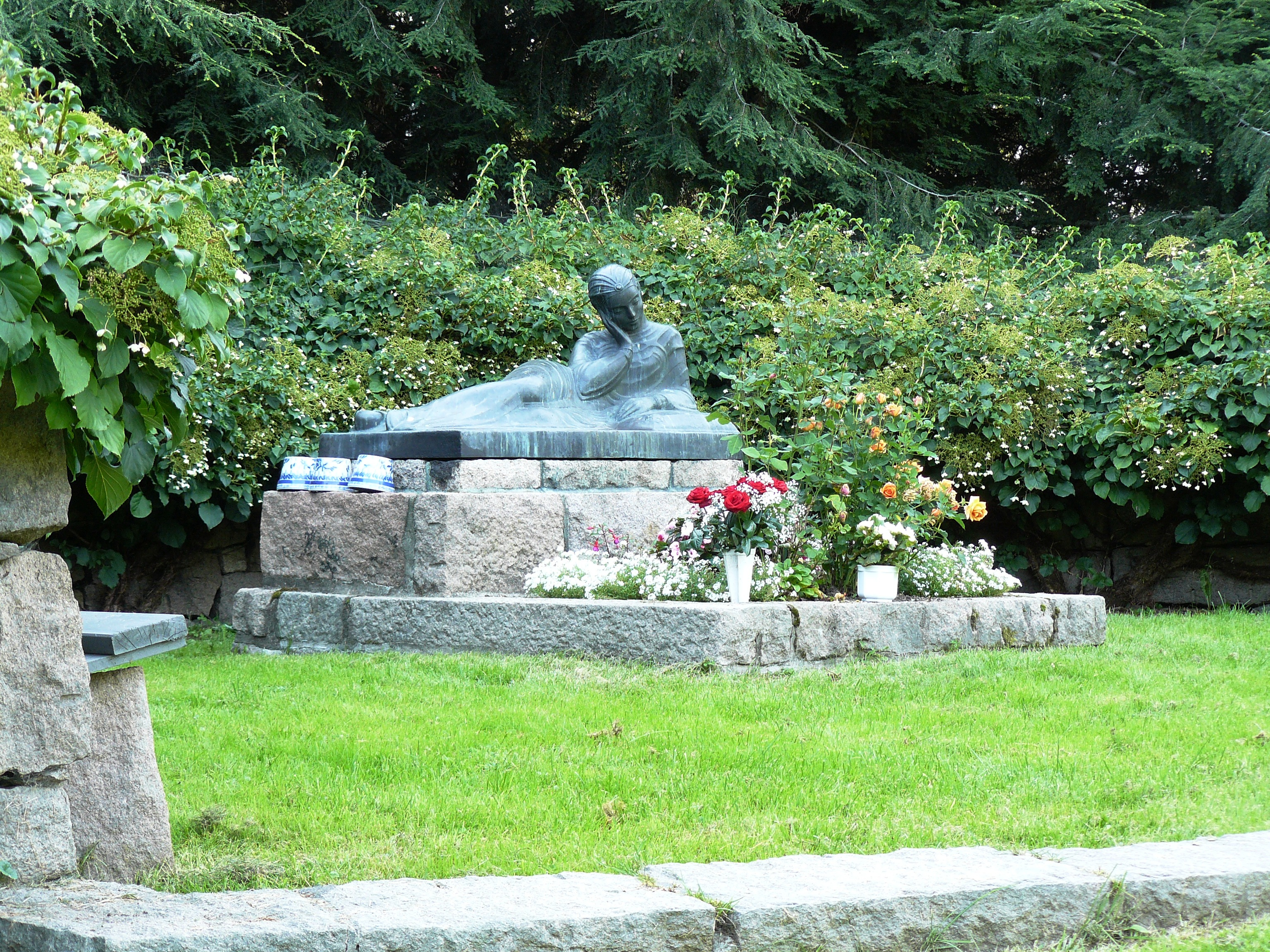
Hvilende Kvinne by Maria Vigeland

Maria Vigeland (13 March 1903 – 8 August 1983) was a Norwegian painter and sculptor.

== Biography ==
She was born in Copenhagen. She was the daughter of Emanuel Vigeland and niece of Gustav Vigeland. She attended the Norwegian National Academy of Craft and Art Industry where he studied under Eivind Nielsen 1920-25 and under Olaf Willums 1928–29. She was trained at the Norwegian National Academy of Fine Arts under Wilhelm Rasmussen in 1930. She later attended École des Beaux-Arts in Paris where she trained under Lucien Simon.

Her religious interests led her to decorating churches and making monuments. In her early years, she studied art in France and Italy. The studies would have particular significance for her stained glass. Vigeland decorated several burial chapels in Oslo, a crematorium in Drammen, an altarpiece and several pictures for Bredtveit Prison. She designed stained glass at various sites including Lovisenberg Church in the district of St. Hanshaugen in Oslo.

Her bronze statues Piken med fuglen (1953) is in Gunnarsbøparken and Piken med sjøpinnsvinet (1954) is on Camilla Colletts vei both in Tønsberg. She also designed the bronze monument Hvilende kvinne (1971) at Østre Aker Cemetery at Ulven in Oslo.
