= Pacewon =

American rapper and producer

- Also known as: Pace Won; Pace1; Pace 1; Pace One; Peacewon; Jerome Hinds
- Born: Jerome Derek Hinds Jr. August 23, 1974 (age 52); New Brunswick, New Jersey, U.S.
- Origin: Newark, New Jersey, U.S.
- Genre: Underground hip hop
- Occupation: Rapper
- Years active: 1997–present
- Labels: Ruffhouse; Detonator; Raw Poetix; Team Won Incorporated
- Formerly of: Outsidaz
- Website: www.teamwoninc.com

Jerome Derek Hinds Jr. (born August 23, 1974), known professionally as Pacewon (also spelled Pace Won), is an American rapper and producer. He rose to fame in the late 1990s as one of the prominent and founding members of rap group Outsidaz along with fellow rappers Young Zee, D.U., Rah Digga and others. The group would later make Detroit rappers Eminem and Bizarre of D12 honorary members of the group after they collaborated with members of the group.

== Career ==
=== Outsidaz ===
As a founding member of the Outsidaz, Hinds was one of the many MCs to gain a solo career after his group's appearance on the Fugees' successful The Score. With a smooth voice and a sly, clever tone, his raps were often relaxed and thoughtful amidst the large hip-hop crew's various styles. Despite the early solo attempts by many of his bandmates, Hinds waited until they had released their debut, Night Life, on Chris Schwartz's Rough Life Records. That, as well as guest appearances on records from Redman and Rah Digga, was enough to convince Schwartz to ask the MC for a solo record in 2002. With help from Wyclef Jean, Kurupt, and fellow Outsidaz member Young Zee, he put together Won, a collection of funky tracks courtesy of Jay-Z producer Ski that revolved around his charismatic voice and boastful rhymes. Later in the year, he collaborated with the UK trip hop act Morcheeba, who included the rapper on two tracks of Charango.

=== Solo ===
In 2004, Hinds released his second album, Telepathy, via Detonator Records, co-produced by himself. After a string of singles in the late 1990s, the rise of former crew member Eminem, and a few years of virtual absence, it seemed that the New Jersey underground rap collective Da Outsidaz would fade into obscurity. However, Hinds managed to find a producer for his gravelly vocals and one-liners in Mr. Green. On The Only Color That Matters Is Green, released in 2008, Mr. Green sets up Hinds' punch line-heavy flow with a barrage of piano loops and soulful horn samples.

Hinds released his third solo album, Team Won Inc, via Ascetic Music / Modulor, where he collaborated with his former bandmate D.U.

In 2012, Hinds once again collaborates with Mr. Green to release their second album, The Only Number That Matters Is Won, via Raw Poetix Records. This record is notable for collaboration with rappers such as Snoop Dogg and Masta Ace.

In 2015, Hinds founded Team Won Incorporated and released his fourth album via his own new record label. He cited the album as a group album introducing his group The Shady Corps.

=== The Shady Corps ===
The Shady Corporation, also known as the "Shady Corps", is a rap group composed of Denton Dawes ("Denzy"), Thomas Wlodarczyk ("Miilkbone"), DJ Scob, Ill Proceeja, and Hinds himself. It is modeled after the Marine Corps and is also an Eminem tribute band. Honoring and celebrating "real" hip hop while carrying on the tradition set forth by Eminem, they share a history that is mostly documented in their songs. On "Fine Line", Eminem explains conditions of their early days in the music industry.

Eminem and Hinds have collaborated on numerous songs together such as "Take the World", "Macosa", and "Rush Ya Clique". Hinds came up with the idea for the Shady Corps while writing the song "He Said It"... In the third verse of the song, Hinds states:

"Sometimes I feel my brother...

I let the music industry steal my brother... So I'm out for vengeance, screaming and blasting and... I'ma start a new group and name it after him... I'm starting up the Shady Corps..." Spitting that real hip-hop like this was Eighty-Four... That role model, nigga, that rah-rah, that crazy raw...

Music, people pay it more attention than they pay to y'all...

== Discography ==
=== Albums ===
==== Solo ====
- 1998 – The Pacewon Affect (unreleased)
- 2002 – Won
- 2004 – Telepathy
- 2008 – Team Won Inc.
- 2015 – The Shady Corps LP (as The Shady Corps)

==== Collaborative ====
- 2000 – Night Life EP (with Outsidaz)
- 2001 – The Bricks (with Outsidaz)
- 2008 – The Only Color That Matters Is Green (with Mr. Green)
- 2012 – The Only Number That Matters Is Won (with Mr. Green)
- 2026 – Built on Bars (By Shane Dollar)

=== Singles ===
- "I Declare War / Step Up" (1998)
- "Sunroof Top / Locked (12")" (2000)
- "Okay, Alright (12")" (2003)
- "Do My Thing" (2015)

=== Videos ===
- "I Declare War"
- "Children Sing"
- "Run Along"
- "Magneto"
