= Let Me Try Again (album) =

Studio album by Tammy Jones
- Released: 1975
- Label: Epic 80853
- Producer: Robin Blanchflower

Tammy Jones chronology
| Let Me Try Again (1975) | Love's a Carousel (1976) |

Let Me Try Again is a 1975 album by Tammy Jones. It contains her hit single "Let Me Try Again" and the follow up "While We're Still Young".

== Background ==
The album was produced by Robin Blanchflower and released on Epic EPC 80853 in 1975..

== Reception ==
The album was reviewed in the 5 July issue of Disc where it was rated as reasonable. The reviewer wrote that Jones managed to give the song she covered an injection of freshness even though she turned "I Am Woman" and "The Way We Were" into singalongs. The reviewer also noted the mum and dad appeal of the album.

The album wasn't well received by the reviewer in the 2 August issue of Record Mirror who said that Jones was straight out of the Julie Rodgers mould.

== Charts ==
The album debuted at No. 44 on the Music Week Top Albums chart for the week of 12 July. The following week it had dropped off the chart and was one the Next Ten chart at No. 54. By 26 July it was back in the Top Albums chart at No. 44.

== Track listing ==
=== A ===
1. "Let Me Try Again" – Caravelli, Michelle Jourdan, Paul Anka, Romuald, Sammy Cahn - 3:10
2. "I Am Woman" – R. Burton, H. Reddy - 2:38
3. "The Wedding" – J. Prieto, F. Jay - 2:48
4. "May You Always" – Larry Markes, D. Charles -2:20
5. "No Regrets" – C. Dumont, I. Taylor - 3:01
6. "While We're Still Young" – Paul Anka, Dessca, Sharder - 3:06

=== B ===
1. "The Way We Were" – M. Hamlisch, A & M. Bergman - 2:53
2. "If Only I Could Live My Life Again" – L. Amade, P. Delanoe, G. Becaud, E. Leighton - 2:22
3. "Can I Trust You?" – Vance, Snyder - Testa, Remigi - 2:43
4. "Behind Closed Doors" – Kenny O'Dell - 2:52
5. "My Happiness" – B. Bergentine, B. Peterson - 2:41
6. "My Way" – Anka, Thibaut, Revaux - 3:40

== Other details ==
- Released on the back of Tammy's success on the TV show 'Opportunity Knocks', winning six times in succession and notching up the highest votes ever recorded and features the top five single "Let Me Try Again" and the follow-up "While We're Still Young".
