= Give Me a Sign (disambiguation) =

Give Me a Sign may refer to:

- "Give Me a Sign", a song by Breaking Benjamin
- "Give Me a Sign", a bilingual French and English song by Ofra Haza
- Give Me a Sign (Charmed episode), episode 15 from season 2 of the TV series Charmed

== See also ==
- "Lord Give Me a Sign", 2006 song by American hip hop recording artist DMX from the album Year of the Dog... Again
