= Touch It (Busta Rhymes song) =

2005 song by Busta Rhymes

Single by Busta Rhymes

from the album The Big Bang
- Released: December 13, 2005
- Length: 3:34
- Label: Aftermath; Interscope
- Songwriters: Trevor James Smith Jr.; Kasseem Dean; Thomas Bangalter; Guy-Manuel de Homem-Christo
- Producer: Swizz Beatz

Busta Rhymes singles chronology
"Where's Your Money?" (2005)	"Touch It" (2005)	"Touch It" (remix) (2006)

Music video
- "Touch It" on YouTube

"Touch It" is a song by American rapper Busta Rhymes. Released on December 13, 2005, it was the first single from Rhymes' Aftermath/Interscope debut, The Big Bang. The song reached number one in New Zealand, and number six in the United Kingdom. The song features a minimalistic beat provided by Swizz Beatz, and a sample from the song "Technologic" by electronic duo Daft Punk. "Touch It" in turn was incorporated into Daft Punk's live album, Alive 2007.

== Background ==
The "Touch It" instrumental was originally created for Eve, but according to Swizz Beatz she turned it down as "she just wasn’t vibing on it at that particular moment". Swizz Beatz then offered it to Busta Rhymes, who was far more enthusiastic and "couldn't wait to take it".

== Chart performance ==
"Touch It"
Busta Rhymes performs a "Touch It" from The Big Bang

The release date for the single in the UK was 15 May 2006. However, due to UK chart rules allowing songs to chart on download sales alone, one week before the single's physical release, "Touch It" managed to make the top 40, entering at #23 on download sales only. After the physical single release, the song climbed to #6, its peak position. The song had a strong chart run initially, spending seven weeks inside the top 30 there, however, because the physical copies of the single were deleted, the single was withdrawn from the chart due to new chart rules stating that singles could only remain in the chart for two weeks after their physical deletion. This is why the record seemingly fell from the UK top 75 from the top 30. The song was also popular on the charts in the U.S., peaking at #16 on the Billboard Hot 100 and topping the chart in New Zealand.

== Charts ==
=== Weekly charts ===
Weekly chart performance for "Touch It"
Chart (2005–2021)	Peak position
Australia (ARIA)	14
Austria (Ö3 Austria Top 40)	50
Finland (Suomen virallinen lista)	10
Germany (GfK)	24
Hungary (Single Top 40)	36
Ireland (IRMA)	9
Italy (FIMI)	20
Netherlands (Dutch Top 40)	34
Netherlands (Single Top 100)	34
New Zealand (Recorded Music NZ)	1
Scottish Singles Sales (Official Charts)	12
Switzerland (Schweizer Hitparade)	23
UK Hip Hop/R&B (Official Charts)	2
UK Singles (Official Charts)	6
US Billboard Hot 100	16
US Hot R&B/Hip-Hop Songs (Billboard)	3
US Hot Rap Songs (Billboard)	2
US Rhythmic Airplay (Billboard)	21

=== Year-end charts ===
Year-end chart performance for "Touch It"
Chart (2006)	Position
UK Singles (OCC)	90
UK Urban (Music Week)	2
US Billboard Hot 100	73
US Hot R&B/Hip-Hop Songs (Billboard)	17

== Certifications ==
Certifications and sales for "Touch It"
Region	Certification	Certified units/sales
New Zealand (RMNZ)	Gold	5,000^{*}
United Kingdom (BPI)	Silver	200,000^{‡}
United States (RIAA) Mastertone	Gold	500,000^{*}
^{*} Sales figures based on certification alone.^{‡} Sales+streaming figures based on certification alone.

== Remix ==
"Touch It" (remix)

Single by Busta Rhymes featuring Mary J. Blige, Rah Digga, Missy Elliott, Lloyd Banks, Papoose and DMX

from the album The Big Bang (intended)
- Released: May 3, 2006
- Recorded: 2006
- Genre: Hip hop
- Length: 3:57
- Label: Aftermath; Interscope
- Songwriters: Smith; Dean; Bangalter; Homem-Christo; Mary J. Blige; Rashia Fisher; Melissa Elliott; Christopher Lloyd; Shamele Mackie; Earl Simmons
- Producer: Swizz Beatz

Busta Rhymes singles chronology
"Touch It" (2005)	"Touch It" (remix) (2006)	"I Love My Bitch" (2006)

Mary J. Blige singles chronology
"Enough Cryin" (2006)	"Touch It" (remix) (2006)	"Take Me as I Am" (2006)

Rah Digga singles chronology
"Make It Hot" / "See It in Your Eyes" (2005)	"Touch It" (remix) (2006)	"Gimme Dat" (2006)

Missy Elliott singles chronology
"We Run This" (2006)	"Touch It" (remix) (2006)	"Love Me or Hate Me" (remix) (2006)

Lloyd Banks singles chronology
"Karma" (2004)	"Touch It" (remix) (2006)	"Hands Up" (2006)

Papoose singles chronology
"Can't Stop the Rain" (2006)	"Touch It" (remix) (2006)	"Bang It Out" (2007)

DMX singles chronology
"Innocent Man" (2006)	"Touch It" (remix) (2006)	"We in Here" (2006)

"Touch It"
Busta Rhymes feat. Mary J. Blige, Rah Digga, Missy Elliott, Lloyd Banks, Papoose and DMX perform a remix of "Touch It"

After the release of "Touch It", a series of remixes were set into play. The main remix features Mary J. Blige, Rah Digga, Missy Elliott, Lloyd Banks, Papoose and DMX. The result was five popular versions of the song and a video, each featuring different well-known hip-hop artists. An EP was released on iTunes featuring four of the remixes on March 7, 2006. The final full-length remix had an accompanying video.

=== Remix video ===
In the opening of the video, the head cheerleader and the rest of the girls are in burgundy and silver outfits. Busta Rhymes then arrives and decides who runs the city. Upon the entrance of each performer, they mention something positive happening. After Bust and Spliff finish their battle (freestyle), the cheerleaders sing and step to the "Touch It" beat. An electronic machine makes a zapping-sound and a bolt of green lighting appears in the background.

In each scene, all the rappers wear colors that match the background. Usually, after one rapper finishes their verse the others appear and start strutting and dancing on beat. The screen shows two or more sides of the other backgrounds and their rappers. After Busta Rhymes, the other rappers appear in this order: Mary J. Blige in white, Rah Digga in pink, Missy Elliott in purple, Lloyd Banks in blue, Papoose in green and DMX in black (he has his hood up). Busta Rhymes and his friend, Spliff Star, appear in red at the beginning and in yellow at the end. Each singer appears with different outfits, such as Busta's white T-shirt, Papoose's, DMX's, Lloyd Banks' jackets, and the ladies' fur coats. During Mary J. Blige's part, her alter ego, Brooke Lynn, appears dressed in a matching white costume. Other cameo appearances in the music video are of Sean Paul, DJ Kay Slay, Deelishis, producer Swizz Beatz, Winky Wright, Félix Trinidad, Black Rob and Spliff Star.

At the 2006 BET Awards, Busta performed the Video Remix live on stage, along with will.i.am, Elliott, Banks, Blige, Papoose, and Rah Digga. DMX was absent for the performance, but his part was played on the screens onstage. The performance also featured a surprise final verse by Eminem, who began with some of Busta's lines from A Tribe Called Quest's "Scenario".

=== Official remixes and versions ===
- Touch It (Remix Version) [Featuring Mary J Blige, Missy Elliott, Rah Digga] (Dirty) – 3:57
- Touch It (Remix Version) [Featuring Mary J Blige, Missy Elliott, Rah Digga] (Clean) – 3:57
- Touch It (Remix Version) [Featuring Lloyd Banks, Papoose] (Dirty) – 3:57
- Touch It (Remix Version) [Featuring Lloyd Banks, Papoose] (Clean) – 3:57
- Touch It (Remix) [Featuring DMX] (Dirty) – 3:55
- Touch It (Remix) [Featuring DMX] (Clean) – 3:55
- Touch It (The Remix) [Featuring Mary J. Blige, Missy Elliott, Rah Digga, Lloyd Banks, Papoose and DMX] (Dirty) – 4:00
- Touch It (The Remix) [Featuring Mary J. Blige, Missy Elliott, Rah Digga, Lloyd Banks, Papoose and DMX] (Clean) – 4:00
- Touch It (Remix) [Featuring Arcángel and De La Ghetto] – 3:32

=== Dedication ===
Busta Rhymes' bodyguard and entourage member, Israel "Izzy" Ramirez, was fatally shot outside the set of the music video for "Touch It" during filming in Brooklyn on February 5, 2006. The case remains unsolved. The video for the remix is dedicated to Ramirez's memory, and includes a slideshow featuring images of him.

=== Nominations and success ===
Along with the video for the original version of the song, a new video was created, featuring abridged versions of all six guest artists' verses. The video also includes cameos from Brooke Valentine, DJ Kay Slay, Sean Paul, Swizz Beatz, Spliff Star, and boxing champions Félix Trinidad and Winky Wright, who had fought in May 2005.

It was nominated for Best Male Video, and Best Rap Video at the 2006 MTV Video Music Awards. Busta Rhymes himself placed it # 1 on his BET Top 25 countdown. It debuted on BET 106 & Park in the spring and received major airplay. The remix was also nominated for Best Rap Solo Performance at the 2007 Grammy Awards.
