= DMX: Soul of a Man =

2006 American reality television series

- Genre: Reality
- Created by: DMX
- Starring: DMX
- Theme music composer: DMX
- Opening theme: "Lord Give Me A Sign"
- Country of origin: United States
- Original language: English
- No. of seasons: 1
- No. of episodes: 6

Production
- Running time: 30 minutes

Original release
- Network: BET
- Release: July 12 – August 16, 2006

DMX: Soul of a Man is a reality television series that recorded the daily life of rapper DMX, and aired primarily on BET.

The six-episode series showcases various aspects of his personal and religious life. The theme song Lord Give Me A Sign is a single from his album "Year of the Dog...Again". The show features DMX, Tashera Simmons, Buddy Wood, Ali Samii, Jack Hudgins, and Randy Acker. Producer Swizz Beatz makes a cameo appearance.

== Theme songs ==
=== Opening themes ===
Title	Vocalist	Episode #
"Lord Give Me A Sign"	DMX	1-6

Additional scoring done by Russell "Aaddict" Howard. Music composing done by Zack "bizness" Burke, Pint, Lab Ratz, Brainz And Nate.

== Episodes ==
No.	Title	Original release date
1	"eXodus"	July 12, 2006
2	"eX-con"	July 19, 2006
3	"eXisting"	July 26, 2006
4	"eXternalization"	August 2, 2006
5	"eXiled"	August 9, 2006
6	"Finale: eXhilerated"	August 16, 2006

Each episode of the show offers a behind the scenes look into the life of DMX, as he travels from New York to Arizona, in hopes of finding peace, before his stint in jail for a traffic violation. As the rapper reflects on his past and questions the future, viewers get a glimpse of his personal experiences as a father, husband, and friend.
