= Francis Goya =

Belgian musician

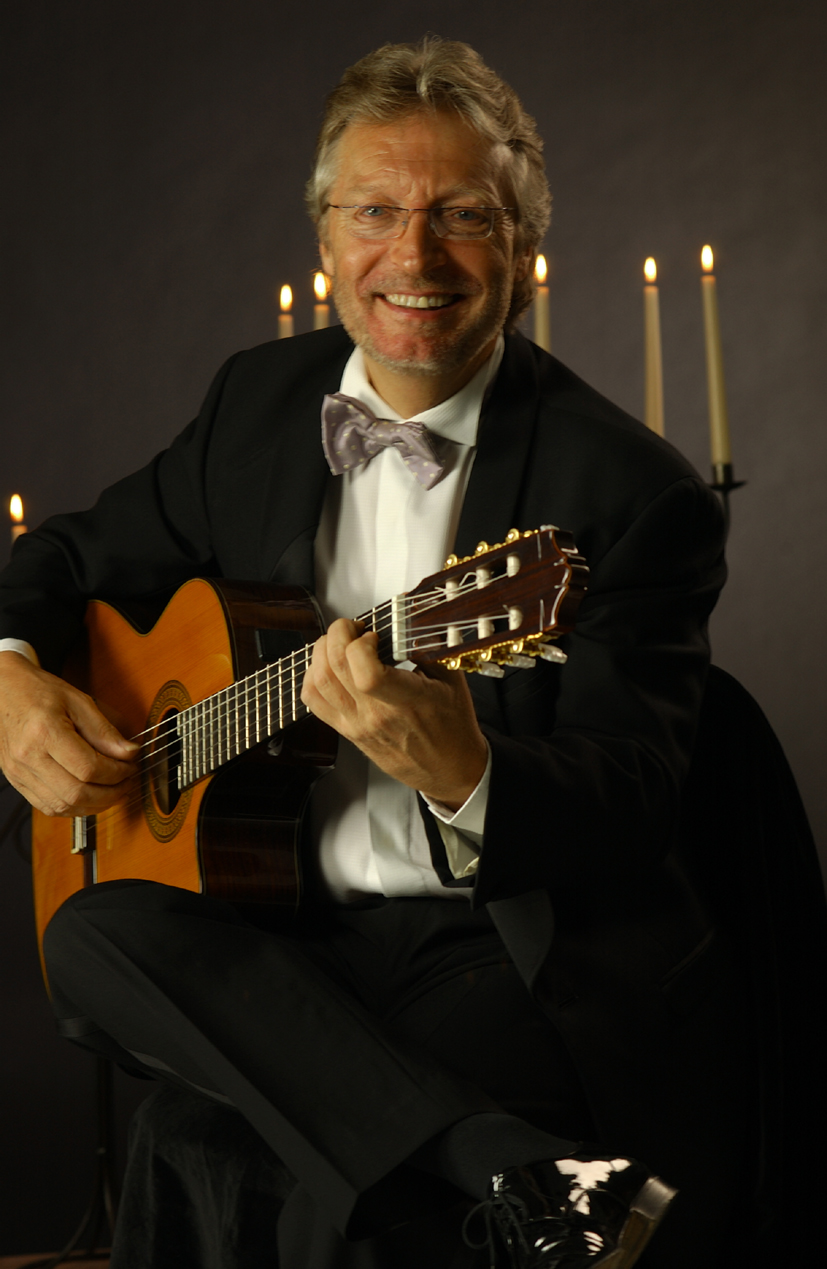
- Born: Francis Weyer; 16 May 1946 (age 80); Liège, Belgium
- Occupation: guitarist

Francis Goya (born François Edouard Weyer; 16 May 1946) is a Belgian classical guitar player and producer. He has recorded fifty albums, many of which have reached gold or platinum status. Francis went solo in 1975, changing his name to Goya. His first solo single, Nostalgia, became an international hit, reaching the top ten in Belgium and the Netherlands.

== Biography ==
Born to a family of musicians, he took a guitar in his hands for the first time at the age of 12. At 16, Francis Goya formed his first group (Les Jivaros) together with his brother, who played the percussion, and several friends. In 1966, he became acquainted with Lou Deprijck, who joined Francis’s rock group, The Liberty Six (Later, Lou was a producer for Plastic Bertrand and composed for him the song Ça plane pour moi, which gained success all over the world). In 1970, Francis Goya was invited to a professional soul music group J J Band, with which he recorded two albums, the second of them produced by Brian Bennett, percussionist for The Shadows. This LP was recorded in London for CBS. Thanks to JJ Band, Francis Goya took part in a tour of Europe and Africa. He also became a studio guitar player and played on the stage with performers of different styles, such as Demis Roussos, The Three Degrees, Vicky Leandros, and others.

=== Nostalgia ===
In 1975, he released his first solo LP, Nostalgia, which quickly reached top positions in the charts. Nostalgia was a tender and romantic melody written by Francis Goya and his father. That was the beginning of his international career. Francis Goya toured with his performances all over the world, from Asia to Latin America, South Africa, Russia etc. Between the tours, he recorded at least one new album; their number has already reached 35 LPs and CDs, and most of them have the status of a gold disc or platinum disc. As of today, Francis Goya has sold millions of his albums all over the world; this is quite a rare case for instrumental music. Francis Goya directed the Eurovision orchestra in Rome in 1991 and in Millstreet in 1993 during the Luxembourgish performances.

=== Latin American influence ===
Francis Goya has always admired Latin American music. In 1991, he decided to record, concurrently with instrumental music, a CD containing Brazilian songs (Bahia Lady). The timbre of his voice and passionate guitar-playing turned out to be a marvelous combination, and the public liked it. He decided to continue working in this way, and, in 1992 and 1993, released two new albums of the same style (Noche Latino and Festival Latino). 1994 was the year for “going back to the roots”, for releasing a new CD of instrumental music, and for a tour of over fifty concerts in the Netherlands. In 1996, a new musical CD in the New Age was released (Gondwana). In 1998 Francis Goya recorded beautiful songs of Jacques Brel, these were released on a CD and distributed all over Europe. Later, a duet album with Richard Clayderman was recorded.

=== Wind from the East ===
The Moscow Nights which was recorded in Moscow, was released in 1981 in all countries of the former Soviet Union, and won enormous success; this allowed Francis Goya to become a Western European star in Eastern Europe.

=== March 2001: first concerts in Estonia ===
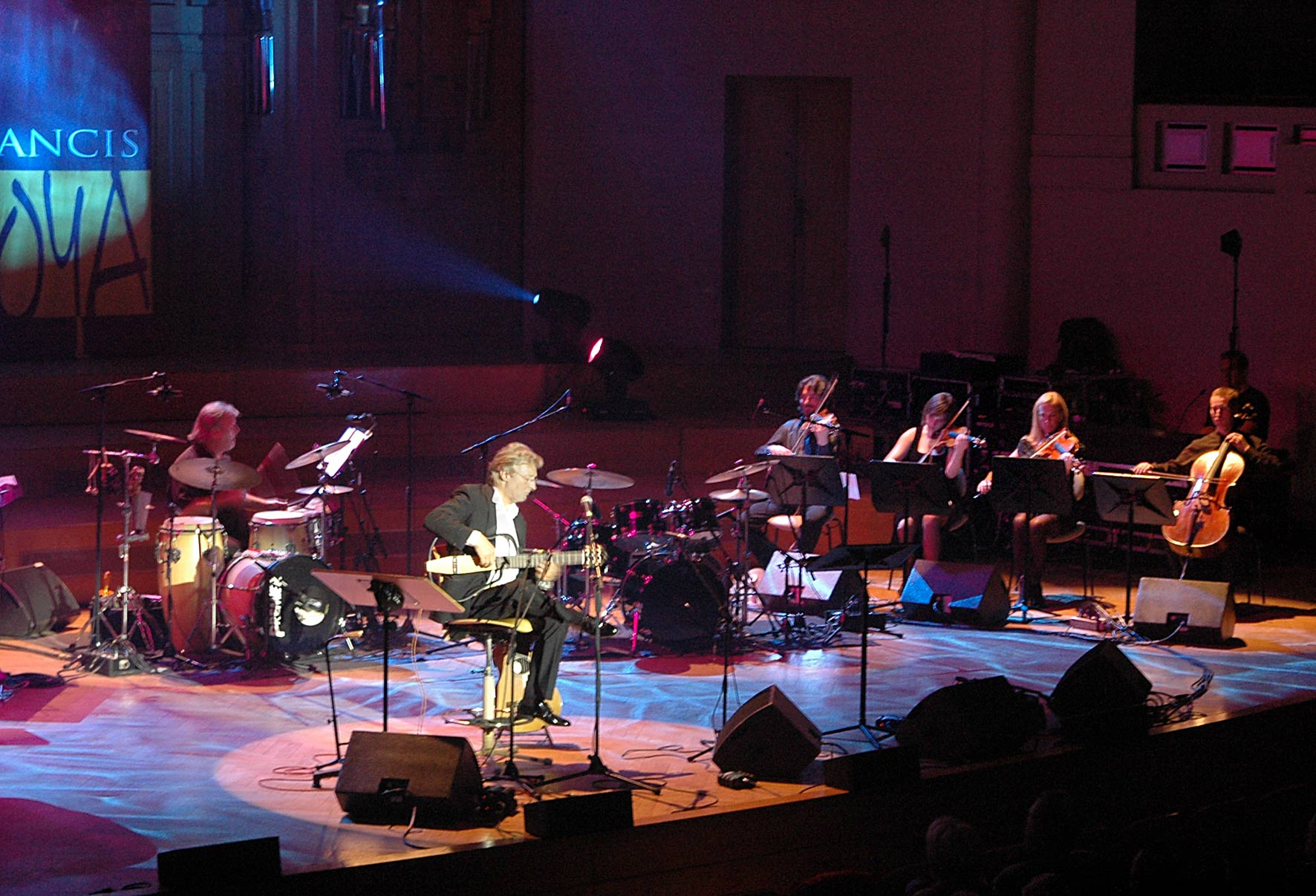
Francis Goya at a concert in Brussels in 2005

After twenty years of success in Eastern Europe, in 2001, Francis Goya was invited to give a concert in Estonia in the Tallinn Philharmonic Hall, with accompaniment of the Chamber Orchestra of the Philharmonic Hall, directed by Jean-Luc Drion, a pianist and a director, who had, by the time, been a friend of Francis Goya for 30 years. The first concert was such a success that Francis Goya had to prolong his stay in Estonia and give a second concert on the following day in the same Philharmonic Hall. After such first experience in Estonia, Francis Goya decided to record an instrumental album that included pieces by the great Estonian composer Raimond Valgre. That album was also a huge success in Estonia. Furthermore, the Russian album entitled A Tribute To Alexandra Pakhmutova which was recorded in Saint Petersburg was widely distributed in Korea, Taiwan and China.

His tours include;

- April 2004: A concert in Saint Petersburg (Russia)
- October 2005: Palais des Beaux Arts in Brussels (Belgium)
- March 2006: A concert in the Philharmonic Hall, Saint Petersburg (Russia)
- April 2006: A concert at Abbaye de Forest in Brussels (Belgium)
- May 2006: A tour of three concerts in Poland (Poznań, Kraków, and Warsaw)
- May 2006: Participation in Braine-l'Alleud Festival (Belgium). Et si on se faisait plaisir
- June 2006: Recording an album specially for China
- September 2006: A concert in l’Église St Étienne in Braine l’Alleud
- November 2006: A grand tour over the Baltic countries
- December 2006: concert in the Oktyabrsky Concert Hall in Saint Petersburg (Russia).
- March 2007: Concerts in Tallinn (Estonia), Vilnius (Lithuania), Riga (Latvia), Valmiera (Latvia), Tartu (Estonia), and Pärnu (Estonia)
- April 2007: A grand concert in Moscow
- May 2007: A gala concert in Cambodia for the benefit of humanitarian organizations (Lions Club)
- May 2007: A concert at the World of Guitar Festival in Kaluga (Russia)
- September 2007: A concert in Waterloo (Belgium)
- October 2007: A concert for the benefit of St Michel Oncological Charity Foundation in Nivelles (Belgium)
- October 2007: A grand tour over Russia
- March 2012: Concerts in Vilnius (Lithuania), Tallinn (Estonia), Riga (Latvia), Moscow, Saint Petersburg, Tyumen, Omsk, Novosibirsk, Ekaterinburg, Izhevsk and Kirov (Russia).
- March 2013: On the occasion of Women's Day, two concerts "Romantic Guitar" 7 in Saint Petersburg Russia, 8 in Tallinn Estonia
- 18 September 2013, Concert in Shenzhen, China
- June 2014: Concert in Sardegna with Charles Aznavour
- November 2014: Concert tour in Siberia, KHABAROVSK, YU-SAKHALINSK, VLADIVOSTOK, PETROPAVLOVSK-KAMCHATSKIY
- May 2015 : Ukraine and Belarus concert tour.
- September 2015: Bulgaria
- April 2016 : Israel
- October 2016 : Belgium
- September 2016 Marrakech - Morocco
- November 2016, Ukraine and Russia
- The concerts continue.
- August 2021, Estonia, Lithuania
- May, 2022, Finland
- Upcoming concerts.
- December 9 and 11, 2022 in New York

In 2006, rapper Busta Rhymes reproduced a sample from Francis Goya's old work Faded Lady, which became No.1 on the USA Top-100 under the title of "New York Shit" (album The Big Bang)

In 2007, the group Safri Duo (Falling Hight) used a sample from Tonight’s the Night piece, which was written by Francis Goya in 1976.

In January 2008, Francis Goya and his family decided to move to Marrakesh (Morocco). Francis Goya continued giving gala concerts in Canada, South Africa, Russia, and Estonia.

In 2010, Francis Goya opened his first musical school, Ateliers Art et Musique (Art and Music Studio) in Marrakesh.

In 2011, he established the Francis Goya Foundation for the cultural development of Moroccan children and teenagers from “problem” regions Site officiel de la Fondation Francis Goya with the assistance of the Belgian Ambassador to Morocco, Consul of Belgium in Morocco, and high officials of the State of Morocco.

2012: A grand tour over the major cities of the Baltic countries and Russia is planned.

== Atelier Art et Musique (Art and Music Studio) in Marrakesh (Morocco) ==
On the initiative of Francis Goya and his daughter Valérie, who also works for the Foundation, l'Atelier Art & Musique Francis Goya was established on 8 March 2010. Moral support of the Consulate of Belgium and Prefecture of Marrakesh and partnership with Yamaha, allowed commencing studies in instrumental and vocal disciplines. Francis Goya provides classes for everyone, from beginners to mature musicians, and in everything, from musical development to solfeggio, including multiple classes in playing the guitar, the piano, and the violin, and classes of dancing and singing. Over a hundred students of various levels enrolled for various courses.

== Francis Goya Foundation for cultural development of children and teenagers from “problem” regions ==
Francis Goya Foundation : Art and music for destitute children all over the world.

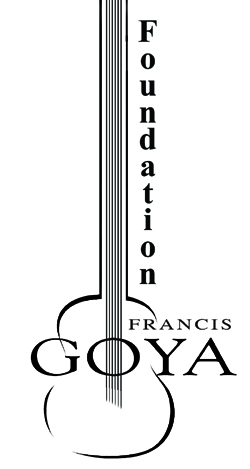
Logo Francis Goya Foundation for Childhood

Throughout his entire long career as a composer and a musician, Francis Goya has always taken part in charity campaigns aimed at collecting donations for the financing of orphanages and secondary schools in Cambodia, the department of urgent pediatrics of the Queen Fabiola Hospital (l’Hôpital Reine Fabiola) in Belgium, and Saint Michel Oncological Foundation in Brussels. When Francis Goya moved, a long time ago, to Morocco he saw that development of Moroccan young population needs support.

An idea occurred to him when he was traveling over the south regions of the country. He was playing the guitar, with his family around him, at a bivouac near a small village, when suddenly a crowd of children ringed round him and started listening too. The idea was developed further: Francis decided to establish a Foundation for revealing of new talents among children and teenagers from “problem” regions and helping them develop their musical talents. To establish the Francis Goya Foundation, support has been received from Francis Goya's Moroccan and European friends, who share the same values. The approach consists in arranging free concerts in order to collect funds to buy musical instruments and to finance singing and dancing classes for children. Schools, orphanages, and mountain regions are visited in order to discover young talents who would benefit from serious musical classes and gain and opportunity of studying abroad, and to find those who need long-term control and assistance. “When life is generous to us, there comes time to give and time to serve – the more so, because music makes hearts warmer. Today is an important day: we are laying the first stone to the base of the edifice, and we would like to use this opportunity to appeal to generosity of the donators for the financing of our ambitious projects, such as donation of musical instruments or taking the charge of conducting artistic classes for children and teenagers from “problem” regions (such as orphanages, hospitals, douars). I would like to thank you in advance for the coverage and publicity that you can give to this good initiative” – the speech of Francis Goya, President of the Francis Goya Foundation

Francis Goya has over 40 album releases to his credit.

== Discography ==
=== Singles ===
- 1975 - "Nostalgia"/"Nautilus"
- 1976 - "Concierto d'Aranjuez"/"Lovers melody"
- 1976 - "Maria Padilha"/"Daddy's bolero"
- 1976 - "Caf'Conc'" (aka "Cafe Concerto")/"Tangoya"
- 1977 - "Gipsy Wedding"
- 1978 - "Argentina"/"Natasha"
- 1978 - "Manolita"/"Natasha"
- 1981 - "Moscow nights"/"Song of the Dnjepr"

=== Albums ===
- 1975 - Nostalgia
- 1976 - Maria Padhila - (retitled Francis Goya 2 in some territories)
- 1977 - Sweet & Softly
- 1978 - Argentina - (retitled 16 Gouden Successen in some territories and 16 Droommelodieën in others, and released on CD as Melodies of Love in 1987)
- 1978 - Christmas Party - (released on CD as We Wish You a Merry Christmas in 1988 and Hollands Glorie Kerst in 2002)
- 1979 - Souvenirs aus Griechenland (with Les Helleniques)
- 1979 - Summernight Moods
- 1979 - Guitarra Romantica - (retitled Spaanse Romantiek in some territories - with 4 songs removed)
- 1979 - Goya By Candlelight - 20 Romantic Hits - (released on CD as Romantic Guitar of Francis Goya in 1985)
- 1980 - Italia Romantica
- 1980 - Moscow Nights
- 1981 - Pohjolan Yössä
- 1982 - Symphony of Love
- 1983 - Quiet Moments: 28 Instrumental Songs of Love (with Solitaire Orchestra)
- 1985 - Concerto For My Love (with Damian Luca) - (retitled Romantic Gala in some territories)
- 1986 - This is Francis Goya - (retitled The Sound of Francis Goya in some territories)
- 1986 - Romantic Moods
- 1987 - Concierto (with Laurens Van Rooyen)
- 1988 - Rendez-vous
- 1990 - Plays His Favourite Hits Vol.1
- 1990 - Bahia Lady (with Carmina Cabrera)
- 1991 - Magic Dreams (with the Norman Candler Strings) - all 10 songs originally appeared on the 12-song LP More Than Ever (year unknown)
- 1993 - Noche Latino (with Carmina Cabrera)
- 1994 - Festival Latino (with Carmina Cabrera)
- 1994 - The Very Best of
- 1994 - Together (with Peter Weekers) - (retitled The Hi-Fi Sound in some territories)
- 1996 - Gondwana
- 1998 - Jacques Brel
- 1998 - Plays His Favourite Hits Vol. 2
- 1999 - Francis Goya in Moscow
- 1999 - Latin Romance
- 1999 - Kesäunelmia
- 1999 - Best of Francis Goya
- 2000 - Together (with Richard Clayderman) - (reissued as Face to Face in 2005)
- 2000 - De Mooiste Sfeermelodieën
- 2001 - Pleased to meet You, Mr. Valgre
- 2002 - Hollands Glorie
- 2002 - A tribute to Alexandra Pakhmutova
- 2003 - Klassieke Droommelodieën
- 2003 - Mystical Reflexions
- 2004 - Rakkaudella
- 2004 - Intimité (with Jean-Luc Drion)
- 2004 - Magic Moments
- 2004 - Tribute To Canadian Composers (Richard Abel & Francis Goya)
- 2004 - Grand Collection
- 2008 - Wings for life
- 2019 - Kochak
- 2019 - Classical Dreams Melodies
- 2020 - The Sweet Guitar of Francis Goya

=== Others ===
- MTV Music History (Year not listed)
- Greatest Hits (Year not listed)
- Emotions (Year not listed)
