= Lena Martell =

Scottish singer (1940–2026)

Background information
- Born: Helen Thomson; 15 May 1939; Glasgow, Scotland
- Died: 5 October 2026 (aged 87)
- Occupation: Singer
- Instrument: Vocals
- Works: "One Day at a Time" (1979)

Helen Thomson (15 May 1939 – 5 October 2026), known professionally as Lena Martell, was a Scottish singer with a long career in theatre, television and musicals. She recorded 30 albums and had a number-one UK single with "One Day at a Time" in 1979.

== Life and career ==
Helen Thomson was born on 15 May 1939 (not 1940 as previously believed) in Glasgow, Scotland to Helen (née Muirhead) and David Thomson, and raised in Hamiltonhill area of the city. She began singing at the age of 11 with her eldest brother's band. She became a singer for the Billy McGregor Band at the Barrowland Ballroom, in Glasgow. After his death, she decided to pursue a career in music as a tribute. She released a number of standards in the 1970s on the Pye record label, drew crowds at cabarets and concert halls and became a major recording star with silver, gold and platinum awards. Much of her work took place aboard many cruise ships accompanied by her pianist George Paxton of Saltcoats, Scotland. Her cover of the song "One Day at a Time", written by Marijohn Wilkin and Kris Kristofferson, reached the top of the UK Singles Chart for three weeks in October 1979. She placed six albums in the UK Albums Chart between 1974 and 1980, including four that reached the top 20.

In the 1970s and 1980s her Saturday night TV shows for BBC Television ran over a period of 10 years, with evening audiences of over 12 million. Moving to the US, she sang in New York and Las Vegas with Frank Sinatra, Sammy Davis Jr. and others and toured the world performing in concert halls. She starred in musicals on Broadway, first when understudying for Barbra Streisand, and headlining at London`s West End theatres. Her successes at London Palladium equalled that of the box office of Shirley MacLaine and Bette Midler.

Although out of the limelight for a period while nursing her sick mother, eventually Martell returned to the music industry. She released a few albums on the ScotDisc label. Her double album One Day at a Time: An Anthology of Song was released on Castle Records in 2003.

Martell had surgery to replace a valve in her heart, and in March 2008 underwent a triple heart bypass operation.

Martell died on 5 October 2026. She was 87.

Throughout her career, her year of birth was consistently noted as 1940, but the order of service at her private funeral was shown to give her year of birth as 1939, which is borne out by the entries of both her birth and death on the National Records of Scotland.

== Discography ==
=== Albums ===
==== Studio albums ====
Year	Title	Details	Peak chart positions	Certifications
Year	Title	Details	UK	Certifications
1964	Some New Someone Blue	Released: 1964; Label: London	—	
1972	Presenting Lena Martell	Released: 1972; Label: Pye	—	
1972	The Touch of Lena Martell	Released: 1972; Label: Pye	—	
1973	This Is Lena Martell	Released: 1973; Label: Pye	—	
1974	That Wonderful Sound of Lena Martell	Released: 1974; Label: Pye	35	
1974	Songs	Released: 1974; Label: Pye	—	
1976	Country Style	Released: 1976; Label: Pye	—	
1977	Hello Misty Morning	Released: 1977; Label: Pye	—	
1977	From Lena Martell With Very Special Love	Released: 1977; Label: Pye	—	
1978	Somewhere in My Lifetime	Released: 1978; Label: Pye	—	
1979	Lena's Music Album	Released: October 1979; Label: Pye	4	BPI: Platinum
1982	Songs of Life	Released: 1982; Label: Ronco	—	
1982	Songs of Love	Released: July 1982; Label: Ronco	—	
1984	Today	Released: 1984; Label: Country House	—	
1985	The Love Album	Released: 1985; Label: Hallmark Marble Arch	—	
1991	Sometimes When I'm Dreaming	Released: 13 January 1992; Label: Scotdisc	—	
2005	Songs from a Woman's Heart	Released: 2005; Label: Scotdisc	—	
2006	Stand by Me	Released: 2006; Label: Scotdisc	—	
2007	The Rose	Released: 2007; Label: Scotdisc	—	
"—" denotes releases that did not chart or were not released in that territory.

==== Compilation albums ====
Year	Title	Details	Peak chart positions	Certifications
Year	Title	Details	UK	Certifications
1972	The World of Lena Martell	Released: 1972; Label: Decca	—	
1975	The Magic of Lena Martell	Released: 1975; Label: Pye	—	
1976	The Best of Lena Martell	Released: 1976; Label: Pye	13	BPI: Gold
1978	The Lena Martell Collection	Released: August 1978; Label: Ronco	12	BPI: Silver
1979	12 FM Golden Greats	Released: 1979; Label: Pye	—	
1980	By Request	Released: 1980; Label: Ronco	9	BPI: Gold
1980	Let the Music Play	Released: 1980; Label: One-Up	—	
1980	Spotlight on Lena Martell	Released: 1980; Label: PRT	—	
1980	Lena Martell	Released: September 1980; Label: Pickwick Super Stars	—	
1980	Beautiful Sunday	Released: November 1980; Label: Ronco	23	BPI: Gold
1981	Feelings	Released: March 1981; Label: Hallmark	—	
1981	Something Simple	Released: 1981; Label: Decca	—	
1981	The Best of Lena Martell	Released: 1981; Label: Reader's Digest	—	
1994	Feelings – The Best of Lena Martell	Released: 1994; Label: True Trax	—	
1996	The Best of Lena Martell – One Day at a Time	Released: 1996; Label: Pulse	—	
2004	My Homeland	Released: 2004; Label: Scotdisc	—	
2008	One Day at a Time: The Ultimate Collection	Released: January 2008; Label: Sanctuary	—	
"—" denotes releases that did not chart or were not released in that territory.

=== Singles ===
Year	Single	Peak chart positions		Certifications
Year	Single	IRE	UK	Certifications
1961	"Love Can Be"	—	—	
1962	"The Reason Why"	—	—	
1963	"Let the Music Play"	—	—	
1963	"I Wish You Well"	—	—	
1964	"I'm a Fool to Want You"	—	—	
1967	"The Pop Group Song"	—	—	
1967	"Somewhere My Love"	—	—	
1968	"In Time"	—	—	
1968	"Come September"	—	—	
1969	"It's Another World"	—	—	
1970	"Love Made a Fool of Me"	—	—	
1970	"For the Love of Him"	—	—	
1971	"I'm Going Home"	—	—	
1971	"Somewhere My Love" (re-release)	—	—	
1972	"It's Too Late Now"	—	—	
1973	"While We're Still Young"	—	—	
1973	"Four and Twenty Hours"	—	—	
1973	"A Scottish Trilogy"	—	—	
1974	"Billy"	—	—	
1974	"Hasta Mañana"	—	—	
1975	"After All Is Said and Done"	—	—	
1976	"Call Collect"	—	—	
1976	"Christmas Every Other Year (Six Weeks Every Summer)"	—	—	
1977	"Times Were"	—	—	
1977	"One Day at a Time"	—	—	
1978	"Somewhere in My Lifetime"	—	—	
1979	"One Day at a Time" (re-release)	27	1	BPI: Gold
1980	"Don't Cry for Me Argentina"	—	—	
1980	"Why Me (Why Me, Lord?)"	—	—	
1981	"Pray with Me"	—	—	
1984	"You're My Hero (The Wind Beneath My Wings)"	—	—	
"—" denotes releases that did not chart or were not released in that territory.

== See also ==
- List of artists who reached number one on the UK Singles Chart
- List of performers on Top of the Pops
- List of one-hit wonders on the UK Singles Chart
