= This Is Your Song (Don Goodwin song) =

Single by Don Goodwin
- B-side: "Help It Along"
- Released: December 1973 (U.S.)
- Recorded: 1973
- Length: 3:12
- Label: Silver Blue
- Songwriter: Paul Anka
- Producer: Johnny Harris • Paul Anka

"This Is Your Song" is a song written by Paul Anka, originally recorded as the B-side of his non-album single, "While We're Still Young", and produced by Arif Mardin in 1972, during Anka's short period on Buddah Records. That single fell just short of the top ten on the Canadian pop chart. But Anka offered the song to his protege, pop singer/songwriter Don Goodwin in 1973. Goodwin grew up in Aspen, Colorado, and was discovered by Paul Anka in Las Vegas.

The Goodwin cover version charted at No. 86 on the U.S. Billboard Hot 100. It also reached No. 44 on the Easy Listening chart. In Canada, it peaked at No. 34 pop and hit the top ten on the Adult Contemporary chart.

In the Netherlands, "This Is Your Song" was issued as the B-side of "Time to Cry".

== Background ==
The song is written by Paul Anka, who saw Don Goodwin at an audition at a Las Vegas hotel. Goodwin was then signed to Joel Diamond's Silver Blue Records after he heard a demo of the song. The song was co-produced by Anka. The song was released in Canada under the Polydor label. The single was followed by "Time to Cry", previously released by Anka in 1959.

Additionally, an album was released entitled "These Are Your Songs" with a personal note written by Paul Anka introducing Don Goodwin.

"THESE ARE YOUR SONGS"(LP / tracks):

side one:

1. "This Is Your Song" (# 10 RPM/AC Pop Singles; # 34 RPM Top Singles)

2. "I Guess It Doesn't Matter Anymore" (B-side of "Baby, Baby Do I")

3. "Help It Along" (B-side of "This Is Your Song")

4. "Diana" (# 36 RPM Pop/AC Singles; # 63 RPM Top Singles)

5. "I'll Never Be Away From You" (B-side of "Diana")

side two:

1. "Baby, Baby Do I" (# 26 RPM Pop/AC Singles)

2. "Time To Cry" (# 4(2) RPM Pop/AC Singles; 41(2) RPM Top Singles)

3. "How Can Anything Be So Beautiful"

4. "Good, Good Lovin'" (B-side of "Time To Cry")

5. Put Your Head On My Shoulder"

== Cover versions ==
Leslie Kendall recorded the song in late 1974, reaching No. 28 U.S. Adult Contemporary and No. 43 Canada AC.

== Chart history ==
Don Goodwin

| Chart (1973–74) | Peak position |
|---|---|
| Canada Top Singles (RPM) | 34 |
| Canada Adult Contemporary (RPM) | 10 |
| US Billboard Hot 100 | 86 |
| US Adult Contemporary (Billboard) | 44 |
| U.S. Cash Box Top 100 | 82 |

Leslie Kendall

| Chart (1974) | Peak position |
|---|---|
| Canada RPM Adult Contemporary | 44 |
| US Adult Contemporary (Billboard) | 28 |
