= Breaking Point (Central Line album) =

Studio album by Central Line
- Released: 9 January 1982
- Recorded: June and October 1981
- Studio: Scorpio Studios; Audio International Studios; Nova Sound Studios, London
- Genre: Brit funk; funk; soul; synth-funk; dance; R&B
- Length: 38:09
- Label: Mercury
- Producer: Roy Carter

Central Line chronology
Breaking Point (1982)	Choice (1984)

Singles from Breaking Point
- 1. "Walking Into Sunshine" Released: August 1981; 2. "Don't Tell Me" Released: January 1982

Breaking Point is the debut studio album by Britfunk band Central Line, released by Mercury Records in February 1982 in the United Kingdom. In the United States, it was released under the name Central Line with a different track listing and artwork. Recorded with producer Roy Carter, formerly of Heatwave, the album features a distinctly English style of synth-funk similarly to contemporaries Hi-Tension and Light of the World. The record was well-received and reached number 64 on the UK Albums Chart and 145 on the US Billboard Top LPs & Tape chart. The hit single "Walking Into Sunshine" was also remixed by Larry Levan and became a popular club hit in New York. In 2007, The Guardian included Breaking Point on their list of "1000 Albums to Hear Before You Die".

== Background and recording ==
Central Line, comprising Lipson Francis, Henry Defoe, Linton Beckles and Camelle Hinds, formed in London in April 1978. The line-up drew mostly from the defunct East London band TFB (Typical Funk Band), other members of which were drummer Errol Kennedy, later of Imagination, and trumpeter Kenny Wellington, later of Light of the World. The group's first single, "What We Got (It's Hot)", showcased a lively R&B-based dance sound, and led to the group touring with The Real Thing, Roy Ayers and Grover Washington Jr. Nonetheless, follow-up single "Sticks & Stones" flopped and the band altered their musical style for their February 1981 single "(You Know) You Can Do It", which became their first UK hit. With these singles, the group became pioneers of the early 1980s Britfunk sound, alongside Imagination, Light of the World and other groups.

Central Line recorded Breaking Point in June and October 1981 at Scorpio Studios, Audio International Studios and London's Nova Sound Studios. The band recorded with producer Roy Carter, formerly of Heatwave, who also remixed "(You Know) You Can Do It" for the album, which had originally been produced by Bob Carter, The album was mixed at Utopia Studios by Greg Walsh, Pete Smith and Pete Walsh; Smith was also present for the recording. In a contemporary interview with Brian Chin of Billboard, Beckles described the sounds of Central Line and their British contemporaries as an advancement on late 1970s British jazz-funk and said of the group's inspiration: "We're trying to establish something from the hearts and minds of blacks in England, how they feel about music and life. It's a very recent development: we're old enough to know our own direction."

== Composition ==
As with the group's British soul contemporaries Light of the World and Hi-Tension, the record exemplifies a style of synth-funk that is fused with an English-styled sensibility with dub characteristics. Writers vary between songs, with Beckles and Francis credited as contributing most. "Walking Into Sunshine" features lyrics of escapist yearning; writer Paul Lester wrote that, released as a single in summer 1981 in the aftermath of the riots in Brixton and Toxteth, the "seemingly innocuous" lyrics "captured the dispirited mood of the moment" with lines like "I can't stand it, this kind of life is not for me... I gotta get away." The version on the album is longer than the single mix, running to five minutes. Beckles said the song used "spiritual approach to writing", with its central metaphor a deliberately "ambigious [sic] term to relate to. Achievement is walking into sunshine." "Don't Tell Me", which was issued as the follow-up single, is funkier in comparison, while the title track is a "jazzily bounding" instrumental that interlays guitar, bass and keyboards and which increases its tempo after an 118bpm intro. James Hamilton of Record Mirror compared "I Need Your Love", with its "doodling" intro, to the work of Chic, while comparing "That's No Way to Treat My Love", with its faster tempo of 128bpm, to a fusion of Eddy Grant and Change.

== Release ==
"Of all the bands involved in the early 80s 'Brit Funk' revival, Central Line came closest to exporting the movement across the Atlantic."

—Colin Larkin

In the United Kingdom, Breaking Point was released by Mercury Records in February 1982 and was promoted in both trade and consumer press. The record spent five weeks on the UK Albums Chart, entering in February and peaking in its third week at number 64, and also topped the Record Business Disco Album charts. In the United States, the album was released as Central Line a month earlier on 9 January 1982; this version had different artwork and a shorter track listing, with "(You Know) You Can Do It" removed and a longer version of "Breaking Point" replacing the original. The album entered the Billboard Top LPs & Tape chart at number 174 in mid-January, and peaked at number 145 in early February.

On the UK Singles Chart, "Walking Into Sunshine" entered in August 1981 and peaked at number 42 whilst "Don't Tell Me" entered in January 1982 and peaked at number 55. "Walking Into Sunshine" was the band's biggest US hit, reaching number 14 on the Hot Soul Singles chart, and number 84 on the Billboard Hot 100. A remix by Larry Levan became a popular club record in New York City in 1981, where "R&B" was becoming the favoured descriptor of the producer's music over "disco"; writer Tim Lawrence wrote that the record "contributed to the growing impression that disco had never been more than a marketing term for a historically rooted sound." The track was also popular at The Loft where it was played by DJ David Mancuso, and Central Line played live at Paradise Garage – the nightclub where Levan was a resident DJ – alongside acts like Junior, Stephanie Mills and Cheryl Lynn. Early in 1982, Record Business described Central Line as becoming "the first British funk band to make inroads in America."

== Critical reception ==
Professional ratings
Review scores
Source	Rating
AllMusic	2/5 stars
Smash Hits	8/10
The Virgin Encyclopedia of R&B and Soul	3/5 stars

In a contemporary review for Smash Hits, Beverly Hillier described Central Line as being "amongst the forerunners of British dance music" and hoped the album would "help put them where they belong," highlighting the title track for being "the kind of brilliant instrumental that will become a dancefloor sensation." A reviewer for Aberdeen Evening Express, who had previously enjoyed "Walking Into Sunshine", praised the album and hailed Central Line for being "[f]our young Londoners showing the Americans how to play first class funk." Mike Hrano of the Harrow Midweek felt the "sharp funk" band deserved more success in Britain outside the "UK disco circuit", comparing them to successful Black British bands like Linx, Beggar & Co and Imagination. He nonetheless felt that, despite being "full of infectious choruses and catchy dance tunes," the album failed to do the group justice, writing: "Central Line are mid Atlantic, with an Anglo-American appeal that's frankly neither here or there."

In 2007, The Guardian included Breaking Point in their list of "1000 Albums to Hear Before You Die," with the caption: "Central Line, like their Brit-soul compatriots Hi-Tension and Light of the World, were trying to make slick synth-funk in the vein of Herbie Hancock or Quincy Jones, but anthems such as 'Walking Into Sunshine' constantly betray their Englishness, with a pleasingly punky, clunky brand of funk and a raw dub sensibility." In 2014, the newspaper included "Walking Into Sunshine" in its list "Britfunk: 10 of the best", with contributor Lester calling it "a new high in terms of a British version of American post-disco slickness" and highlighting its "sonic immaculacy and gorgeous escapist yearning." In a review for Uncut of Central Line's The Collection (2003), Marcello Carlin said that "Walking Into Sunshine" earned the band "immortality" and wrote that the compilation made "noticeable how much better" the material from Breaking Point was to the group's later work, describing "That's No Way to Treat My Love" and "Don't Tell Me" as "US funk-rivalling highlights."

== Track listing ==
=== Side one ===
1. "Walking Into Sunshine" (Linton Beckles, Lipson Francis, Roy Carter) – 5:02
2. "I Need Your Love" (Beckles, Francis, Anthony McCorkell) – 4:55
3. "Breaking Point" (Francis, Beckles) – 4:04
4. "Goodbye" (Hinds, Defoe, Steve Jeffries) – 3:55

=== Side two ===
1. "That's No Way to Treat My Love" (Beckles, Francis, Carter) – 4:50
2. "Don't Tell Me" (Beckles, Francis, McCorkell) – 5:36
3. "(You Know) You Can Do It" (Francis, Hinds, Beckles) – 4:45
4. "Shake It Up" (Beckles, Francis, McCorkell) – 4:25

=== US version ===
==== Side one ====
1. "Walking Into Sunshine" – 5:02
2. "I Need Your Love" – 4:55
3. "Breaking Point" – 5:44
4. "Shake It Up" – 4:25

==== Side two ====
1. "That's No Way to Treat My Love" – 4:50
2. "Don't Tell Me" – 5:36
3. "Goodbye" – 3:55

== Personnel ==
Adapted from the liner notes of Breaking Point

Central Line

- Linton Beckles – vocals, percussion
- Henry Defoe – lead and rhythm guitar
- Lipson Francis – keyboard
- Camelle Hinds – vocals, bass

Additional

- Dee Sealy – backing vocalist
- George Chandler – backing vocalist
- Jimmy Chambers – backing vocalist
- Central Line – design
- Mel Gaynor – additional drums
- Arun – lacquer cut
- Greg Walsh – mixing
- Pete Smith – mixing, recording
- Pete Walsh – mixing
- Peter Ashworth – photography
- Roy Carter – producer, remix (track 7), keyboards (track 8), guitar (track 8)
- Bob Carter – producer (track 7)
- Dennis Weinreich – recording
- Jake Le Mesurier – percussion (track 8)
- Danny Cummings – congas, percussion, bongos
- Steve Jeffries – keyboards (track 4)

== Charts ==
Chart (1982)	Peak position
UK Albums Chart	64
US Billboard Top LPs & Tape (Central Line)	145
