= Keep That Same Old Feeling =

12 single by Hot Cuisine
- A-side: "Keep That Same Old Feeling"
- B-side: "You and Me"
- Released: 1982
- Label: Kaleidoscope Records Limited KRLA 13 2560
- Composer: Hot Cuisine
- Producer: Roy Carter

"Keep That Same Old Feeling" is a 1982 single by the UK group Hot Cuisine. It was a hit for them that year in the UK on the dance chart.

== Background ==
"Keep That Same Old Feeling" was written by the group Hot Cuisine and produced by Roy Carter. It was backed with "You and Me" and released on Kaleidoscope KRL A13-2560.

In late July 1982 on a Saturday, Hot Cuisine drove from Sheffield in the morning to Tolworth in South-West London to do a set of all-day promotional gigs, starting at the Venue and then six more club appearances before driving back to Sheffield at day-break the following morning.

== Reception ==
The single was reviewed in the 24 July issue of Record Mirror where it was referred to as a simple high-pitched unison chanted and harmonized flowing kicker with 125 bpm. The reviewer also noted the twiddling synthesizer and catchy vocal pattern.

James Hamilton's assessment of the single in the 11 September issue of Record Mirror informed the readers that the record had a complete Rockers Revenge style remix and called it almost a remake. He noted the flanged flutter echo handclaps but said that it was unfortunate that the tempo wasn't changed.

== Charts ==
"Keep that Same Old Feeling" debuted at No. 65 on the Record Mirror Disco 45s chart for the week of 31 July. The record dropped down from No. 65 to No. 71 for the week of 7 August. For the week of 14 August, the record moved up from No. 71 to No. 49. The following week it dropped down to No. 59. It was still in the chart at No. 82 for the week of 28 August.
