= Let Me Try Again =

"Let Me Try Again" is a song that was composed by Caravelli, Michelle Jourdan, Paul Anka and Sammy Cahn. It has been recorded by Frank Sinatra and Tammy Jones.

== Frank Sinatra version ==
"Let Me Try Again (Laisse Moi Le Temps)"

Song by Frank Sinatra

from the album Ol' Blue Eyes Is Back
- A-side: "Let Me Try Again (Laisse Moi Le Temps)"
- B-side: "Send in the Clowns"
- Released: 1973
- Label: Reprise REP 1181
- Composers: Music by Caravelli, French lyric by Michelle Jourdan, English version by Paul Anka and Sammy Cahn
- Producer: Don Costa

=== Background ===
Working with producer Don Costa and arranger Gordon Jenkins, Frank Sinatra recorded "Let Me Try Again". Backed with Stephen Sondheim's "Send in the Clowns, it was released on Preprise single, REP 1181 in October 1973.

=== Airplay ===
==== Canada ====
Along with "Time in a Bottle" by Jim Croce and "Mind Games" by John Lennon, "Let's Try Again" was one of the three singles in the Adult section of the RPM Weekly "Action Sides" feature. They were singles which were projected to reach the top 25 of their respective charts, based on the early action of radio stations. The single was already on the playlists of CKLY in Lindsay, CHML in Hamilton, CFRB in Toronto, CKX in Brandon, CKAP in Kapuskasing, CHEC-FM in Lethbridge and CHFI-FM in Toronto.

=== Charts ===
==== United States ====
In 1973, the single reached No. 63 on the Billboard chart in the United States. It also made it to No. 23 on the Adult Contemporary chart.

==== Canada ====
"Let Me Try Again" debuted at No. 93 on the RPM Weekly RPM 100 Singles chart for the week of 24 November.

==== UK ====
In the UK it reached No. 52.

== Tammy Jones version ==
"Let Me Try Again"

Song by Tammy Jones

from the album Let Me Try Again
- A-side: "Let Me Try Again"
- B-side: "Just One Woman"
- Released: 1975
- Label: Epic S EPC 3211
- Composer: Caravelli/Romuald/Michelle Jourdan/Paul Anka/Sammy Cahn
- Producer: Robin Blanchflower

"Let Me Try Again" was a 1975 single by Tammy Jones. It was a Top Ten hit in the UK for her that year.

=== Background ===
Working with producer Robin Blanchflower and arranger Alan Tew, Tammy Jones recorded the Caravelli, Romuald, Michelle Jourdan, Paul Anka, Sammy Cahn composition, "Let Me Try Again". Backed with Ronnie Scott's "Just One Woman", it was released on Epic single S EPC 3211 in April 1975.

It was noted by Record Mirror in the publication's 26 April issue that there were three Tammy's in the chart listings. Tammy Wynette with her hit "Stand By Your Man" was in the Record Mirror chart again, Tammy Jones was in the same chart with "Let Me Try Again" and Tammi Lynn was breaking out with "Gonna Run Away from You".

It was suggested by Record Mirror in the publication's 3 May 1975 issue that the exposure Tammy Jones received in the television show, Opportunity Knocks helped push her record into the charts.

The song is included on Jones' album Let Me Try Again which was produced by Robin Blanchflower and released on Epic EPC EPC 80853.

=== Reception ===
The single was reviewed in the 19 April issue of Disc where it was called a big blustering ballad with Eurovision-like appeal. The reviewer also wrote that it beat songs that were entered but it still wasn't much.

According to the 31 May issue of Record Mirror, a romantic ballad in the springtime was a combination that worked for Tammy Jones and her song "Let Me Try Again" wasn't just another old Frank Sinatra number.

=== Charts ===
==== Record Mirror ====
"Let Me Try Again" was at No. 2 on the Record Mirror Star Breakers chart for the week of 19 April. It debuted at No. 30 on the Record Mirror British Top 50 Singles chart for the week of 26 April. It peaked at No. 5 for the week of 24 May. It was still in the chart at No. 43 for the week of 28 June.

==== Other UK charts ====
"Let Me Try Again" was one of the Music Week Star Breakers for the week of 12 April 1975.

For the week of 3 May, "Let Me Try Again" debuted at No. 24 in the Disc Top Thirty Singles chart.

"Let Me Try Again" was at No. 5 in the Music Week Sheet Music chart for the week of 28 June.

=== Television ===
Tammy Jones performed the song on BBC1 Top of the Pops on 1 May 1975 and 15 May 1975.
