= Neville Nash =

- Born: Neville Paulsen; South Africa
- Occupation: Singer
- Labels: Nash, Solid Records, Kaleidoscope Records Limited, Nitty Gritty Records, C.T.V. Records

Neville Nash is a South African singer who had hits in his country during the 1980s which include "Gimme the Love", "One of Those Nights" and "Feel It".

== Background ==
Nash was born Neville Paulesen in Ravenshead. Starting out as a singer in his teens, he sang with bands; Mama's Cream, Stonehenge, Bloodshed and Poison. He later joined the Pretoria-based group Miracles. He was discovered by Ralph Simon and Clive Calder and recorded for their label. After a lack of success, he formed his own label Nash Records.

He has been described by South African History Online as a soulful crooner who sang like a dream.

His song "Harmony" is used in a short film about the Elim Mission Massacre.

Nash worked with producer Tom Mkhize who also produced Adelle First.

== Career ==
Working with producer Mike Pilot, Nash recorded the Alison Lowry / Roy Clarke composition "Disco Lover". Backed with "Disco Locomotive", it was released on Trova S-113 in 1979.

Nash recorded "Gimme the Love" ("Give Me the Love"). It was a hit in South Africa where it got to No. 13 during its six-week run in 1980.

Working with producers Francis Goya and Bart van de Laar, Nash recorded "It's a Real Good Feeling". Backed with "Song For Mama", it was released on single, TTR WEAN 18.475 in March 1981. It made the charts in Holland, peaking at No. 19 on the Tip Parade Top 40 for the week of 11 April during its three-week run.

Nash recorded the single "Wind Me Up" which was produced by Roy Carter. It was released on the Kaleidoscope Records Limited label in 1982. It bubbled under the South African Singles chart from the week of 26 March to 16 April 1982.

Nash wrote the song "I Just Wanna Be with You" for South African singer Adelle First who he had discovered.

In 1985 Nash had a big hit with "One of Those Nights" The song appeared on his What's Your Name, What's Your Number? album. Also that year, he appeared on stage at the Concert in the Park event in a white suit and wearing a gold chain. He put on what was said to be an impressive performance. "One of Those Nights" was included on the various artists Concert in the Park album that was released on WEA in 1985.

Nash, along with Anneline Malebo, Mara Louw, Katie Pennington, The Angels, PJ Powers, Jean Rockwell, Selby Vaughn, Ebony, Street Kids, Amampondo, Sipho Gumede and Stimela went into RPM Studios to work with Charmaine Modjadji to record the Give Praise Where Praise Is Deserved an album which was a tribute to Bishop Desmond Tutu. It was released in 1985.

In 1986, year released his album Why?. A song from the album, "Feel It" was a hit for him.
