= Roy Carter (producer) =

English musician (born 1955)

- Born: Roy Anthony Carter; September 1955 (age 71)
- Genres: Soul, pop, R&B, funk
- Occupations: Musician, songwriter, producer
- Instrument: Guitar
- Years active: 1970s to present
- Formerly of: Clem Curtis & The Foundations; Heatwave; Central Line; Danny D. & Collusion

Roy Anthony Carter (born 1955) is an English musician, songwriter and music producer. He has written or co-written hits for Instant Funk, Central Line, Animal Nightlife, David Grant, and Jermaine Stewart. He has also been a member of groups, Clem Curtis & The Foundations, Heatwave, Central Line and Danny D. & Collusion. In later years he ran a television music production company.

== Background ==
Carter was a member of Clem Curtis & The Foundations, and along with fellow members David Christopher George, Valentine Pascal, Derek Lewis, and John Lumley-Savile was backing Clem Curtis.

Carter was part of the line up of Heatwave that also included Johnnie Wilder, Keith Wilder, Mario Mantese, Rod Temperton, Bilbo Berger and Billy Jones and played on their second album Central Heating. According to Jazz Rock Soul, Carter was with the band until 1979.

== Career ==
=== Clem Curtis & The Foundations ===
By the mid-1970s, Carter was part of Clem Curtis & The Foundations. With Curtis and the other members, Carter went to Australia for a tour in 1975. Unfortunately there were some problems with lead singer Clem Curtis being charged with a supposed assault by the New South Wales police which resulted in Curtis being handcuffed and locked in a cell.

Along with Valentine Pascal and Georges Delanbanque, Carter co-wrote the song "Amanda" which was the B side of "Make a Wish". The single which was released on Riverdale RR 100 was credited to Clem Curtis & The Foundations Ltd., was reviewed in the 29 May 1976 issue of Record Mirror. Carter also composed a piece of music called "The Foundations Theme".

Carter, John Savile, Valentine Pascal, Clem Curtis and Georges Delanbanque performed the John Macleod and Dave Meyers composition, "Where Were You When I Needed Your Love" for Eurovision '77. It was a favorite to win, but the electricians went on strike and their performance wasn't televised. They did secure a third place with "Where Were You When I Needed Your Love" behind the second placer "What Do You Say To Love" by Mary Mason and "Rock Bottom" by Lynsey de Paul as the winner. "Where Were You When I Needed Your Love" was released as a single on Summit SU 100 in March 1977.

=== Heatwave ===
According to his interview with Anthony Bozzola on 30 July 2013, Carter joined Heatwave in 1977. He replaced Heatwave member Jesse White who was murdered.

He contributed rhythm guitar, bass guitar, Fender Rhodes and acoustic piano to Heatwave's Central Heating album that was released in 1978.

=== Central line ===
Carter produced Central Line's single, "Walking into Sunshine" which was released late July / early August 1981.

Carter produced the self-titled album for Central Line which was released on Mercury SRM-1-4033 in late 1981. One of the Feature Picks, the album was reviewed by Cash Box in the magazine's 26 December issue. With the reviewer praising London r&b bands, Central Line was called "the true cream of the genre" with "Walking into Sunshine" singled out as a testament to that. Other picks were "Goodbye" and "Shake It Up." That same week it made its debut in the Cash Box Black Contemporary Top 75 Albums.

He produced Central Line's version of "Nature Boy" which spent eight weeks in the UK charts, peaking at no. 21 in January 1983.

On the week of 6 August 1983 his composition "Lovely Day", recorded by Central Line, made its debut at 89 in the Music Week The Next 25 chart. Spending three weeks in the charts, it peaked at no. 81.

His production, "Time for Some Fun" by Central Line made its debut in the Music Week The Next 25 chart at no. 99 on the week of 26 November 1983.

With Jermaine Stewart, Narada Michael Walden and Jeffrey Cohen, he co-wrote the song "Jody" which made it to no. 9 on the Dance chart in 1986.

=== Further activities ===
Carter remixed the Hot Cuisine song "Ride on a Rhythm" which was written by Biddu, Ron Roker and Anne Dudley. Dudley, Biddu produced the song. It was released on Kaleidoscope Records Limited in March 1982. James Hamilton reviewed it in the 20 March issue of Record Mirror. Even though Hamilton wrote that the song was bland, he did say that it thudded along with everything under careful control. He also noted Roy 'Mr Magic' Carter's salvaging remix attempt. It debuted at No. 62 on the Record Mirror Pop Oriented Dance chart for the week of 10 April 1982. It peaked at No. 54 for the week of 8 May.

Carter produced the Hot Cuisine single "Keep That Same Old Feeling" which was released on the Kaleidoscope Records Limited label in 1982. It was a dance hit, peaking at No. 49 on the Record Mirror Disco 45s chart for the week of 14 August.

Carter produced the single "Wind Me Up" for singer Neville Nash which was released on the Kaleidoscope Records Limited label in 1982. It bubbled under the South African Singles chart from the week of 26 March to 16 April 1982.

With Pete Wingfield, Carter co-produced the debut, self-titled album for Second Image which was released in 1983. Also in the same year, Whodini released their self-titled album. Carter produced the tracks "Underground" and "Yours for a Night". According to a Rap Reviews article dated 22 September 2020, the attempts that Carter and co-producer Willesden Dodgers made to give snappy percussion and slinky funk to "Yours for a Night" made Whodini sound like a parody of New Edition.

He co-wrote "Who Took Away the Funk" with Josephine James for Instant Funk. It charted in the US, making it to no. 70 in the Billboard Black singles chart.

Along with Andy Polaris, Billy Chapman, Flid, Leonardo Chignoli and Paul Waller, he co-wrote "Mr. Solitaire" for Animal Nightlife. Making its debut in the Uk charts on 8 August 1984, it spent thirteen weeks in the charts, peaking at no. 25. The following year he had a hand in composing their song "Preacher Preacher" which spent two weeks in the charts, peaking at no. 67.

He produced the single "Blown Away" for the group Darts that was released in late May 1985.

With David Grant he co-wrote the song "Change" which became a hit for Grant in 1987 and spent five weeks in the UK charts from 25 July to 22 August, peaking at no. 55.

Carter was booked to appear at the Norfolk Motorhome Show 2018, billed as Memories of the Four Tops, Tameeka Jackson and Roy Carter. His old group Clem Curtis & The Foundations was on the same bill. However, Clem Curtis had died the previous year.
