= Johnny Wakelin =

English recording artist (born 1939)

- Born: 1939 (age 86–87); Brighton, East Sussex, England
- Genres: Rock and roll, reggae, R&B, pop
- Occupation: Singer
- Instrument: Vocals
- Years active: 1974–present
- Label: Pye Records

Johnny Wakelin (born 1939) is an English recording artist best known for songs like "Black Superman" and "In Zaire", both celebrating boxer Muhammad Ali.

== Career ==
Wakelin had his first outings in clubs in his hometown but without big success. Discovered by Pye record producer Robin Blanchflower, the man who launched Carl Douglas to the top of the UK Singles Chart with "Kung Fu Fighting", and working with Steve Elson and Keith Rossiter in addition to Blanchflower, Wakelin set about writing songs that would, he hoped, "catch people's eye"

=== "Black Superman (Muhammad Ali)" ===
Wakelin wrote a tribute to the boxing champion Muhammad Ali who fought on 30 October 1974 in Kinshasa, Zaire, against George Foreman in a matchup known as The Rumble in the Jungle. Ali gained victory in the eighth round. Wakelin used a reggae style at a time when West Indian music was growing in popularity. The new song was Wakelin's "Black Superman (Muhammad Ali)" released in late 1974.

In January 1975 the song reached number seven on the singles charts of both the UK and Australia. By October of the same year, it had reached number one in Canada on the RPM Singles Chart. It also spent six months in the US Billboard Hot 100 in more than one chart run in 1975, eventually peaking at No. 21 in September of that year.

=== Later songs ===
1975 brought a further single, "Cream Puff," backed by "Gotta Keep on Going"; it flopped, but both songs would be incorporated into Wakelin's March 1976 album, Reggae, Soul & Rock 'n' Roll.

A bigger success was "In Zaire", also about the 1974 fight, which reached the charts in many parts of Europe in 1976, including #4 in the UK Singles Chart.

After few further releases ("Africa Man", "You Turn Me On", "Dr. Frankenstein's Disco Party") his success cooled down. He re-recorded his hit "In Zaire" in different versions which had a little success. He stayed active as a songwriter, and continued to release albums.

Wakelin sang "Where Seagulls Fly", the Brighton & Hove Albion F.C. anthem released for their appearance in the 1983 FA Cup Final.

== Discography ==
=== Albums ===
- Black Superman (1975)
- Reggae, Soul & Rock 'n' Roll (1976)
- In Zaire (1976)
- African Man (1976)
- Double Trouble (1978)
- Gems from the Pen (1984)
- Rock 'n' Country Blues (1996)
- From Ali to the Naz (1997)
- Sway with Me (2005)
- In Africa (2005)
- Right Before My Eyes (2006)
- No Smoking (2007)

=== Singles ===
Year	Single	Peak chart positions									
Year	Single	UK	AUS	AUT	BE (FLA)	CAN	GER	IRE	NL	NZ	US
1974	"Black Superman (Muhammad Ali)" (as Johnny Wakelin & the Kinshasa Band)	7	7	—	—	1	—	9	—	21	21
1975	"Tennessee Hero (Elvis)"	—	50	—	—	—	—	—	—	—	—
1975	"Cream Puff"	—	—	—	—	—	—	—	—	—	—
1976	"Reggae – Soul – And Rock 'n' Roll"	—	—	—	—	—	—	—	—	—	—
1976	"In Zaire"	4	25	2	2	—	2	10	2	—	—
1976	"Africa Man"	—	—	8	24	—	10	—	—	—	—
1977	"Doctor Frankenstein's Disco Party"	—	—	—	—	—	—	—	—	—	—
1978	"Afro Afrique"	—	—	—	—	—	—	—	—	—	—
1979	"Lay Down and Rock Me"	—	—	—	—	—	—	—	—	—	—
1979	"Grand Theft"	—	—	—	—	—	—	—	—	—	—
1983	"Where Seagulls Fly"	—	—	—	—	—	—	—	—	—	—
1986	"Bruno"	—	—	—	—	—	—	—	—	—	—
1988	"Get Off the Street" (Germany-only release)	—	—	—	—	—	—	—	—	—	—
1989	"One Million to One" (Germany-only release)	—	—	—	—	—	—	—	—	—	—
"—" denotes releases that did not chart or were not released in that territory.

== See also ==
- List of performers on Top of the Pops
- List of people from Brighton and Hove
- List of 1970s one-hit wonders in the United States
