= Where's Your Money? =

Single by Busta Rhymes featuring ODB

from the album The Big Bang (intended)
- Released: September 27, 2005
- Recorded: 2005
- Genre: East Coast hip hop
- Label: Aftermath/Interscope
- Songwriters: T. Smith; R.T. Jones
- Producer: Hillie Hill

Busta Rhymes singles chronology
"Don't Cha" (2005)	"Where's Your Money?" (2005)	"Touch It" (2005)

Ol' Dirty Bastard singles chronology
"Got Your Money" (1999)	"Where's Your Money?" (2005)

"Where's Your Money?" is a single by Busta Rhymes featuring ODB. It is produced by Hill, who has produced songs for Nas, "Purple", and "Black Zombies" off the 2002 The Lost Tapes. "Where's Your Money" was released on September 27, 2005. It was supposed to be the first single off The Big Bang but was cancelled.

== Charts ==
Chart (2005)	Peak position
US Hot R&B/Hip-Hop Songs (Billboard)	65
