= Central Line (band) =

English R&B and soul band

- Origin: London, England
- Genres: R&B
- Years active: 1978–1984; 2024–2025
- Label: Mercury
- Spinoffs: The Style Council; Londonbeat
- Past members: Steve Salvari; Camelle Hinds; Henri Defoe; Linton Beckles; Lipson Francis; Jake Le Mesurier; Mel Gaynor; Michael F Murphy; Dee Sealy; Jimmy Chambers; Steve Jeffries; Roy Carter; Danny Cummings; George Chandler

Central Line is an R&B and soul band from London, England that disbanded in 1984, though they played again in 2025. They recorded two albums with Mercury in the 1980s and had two hit singles in the United States and one top 40 hit in Britain.

== Career ==
=== 1970s ===
The band was formed in March 1978, and were signed to Mercury Records early in 1979 by John Stainze. The original founding members were Steve Salvari, Camelle Hinds, Lipson Francis and Henry Defoe. Hinds, Francis and Defoe were previously in a band called TFB (Typical Funk Band), which had contained members that would go on to form Light of the World. TFB also contained the drummer Errol Kennedy, who later joined Imagination. Salvari joined TFB after the departure of trumpeter Kenny Wellington in late 1976 who joined Light of the World, as their second keyboard player and the band members then stood at Salvari, Hinds, Francis, Defoe and Kennedy. The band gigged for about a year then broke up. Francis and Defoe went to work with a bass player who was in Boney M., and Salvari and Hinds staying together to work on various projects.

In early 1978, four of the TFB members got back together, and expanded the previous format by recruiting Linton Beckles (born Linton Charles Beckles, 17 December 1955 – 3 April 2015) and Kim "Jake" Le Mesurier (younger son of English actors John Le Mesurier and Hattie Jacques and brother of longtime Rod Stewart guitarist Robin Le Mesurier). The band decided they needed a new identity, and Defoe came up with the name Central Line, because the band were now running down a central line of funk and soul.

They toured with Roy Ayers, Grover Washington, Fat Larry's Band and the Real Thing. Central Line released their debut single, "Wot We Got Its Hot" to a good reception, but their second single "Sticks & Stones" did not fare so well. They finished the year appearing on BBC Television's, Linda Lewis' Roadshow.

=== 1980s ===
On the week of 3 October 1981, Cash Box had "Walking in the Sunshine (remix)" was at no. 1 in the Northeast Dance Music Chart. Two weeks later on the 17th of that month while still at no. 1 on the Northeast Dance Music chart, "Walking in the Sunshine" debuted at no. 90 in the Cash Box Top 100 Singles chart.

Their self-titled album which was produced by Roy Carter was released on Mercury SRM-1-4033 in late 1981. One of the Feature Picks, the album was reviewed by Cash Box in the magazine's 26 December issue. With the reviewer praising London r&b bands, Central Line was called "the true cream of the genre" with "Walking into Sunshine" singled out as a testament to that. Other picks were "Goodbye" and "Shake It Up." The album also made its debut at no. 62 in the Cash Box Black Contemporary Top 75 Albums chart that week.

Despite a club hit with "Walking into Sunshine" which sold well in the United States, and a UK top 40 hit with "Nature Boy", consistent mainstream success eluded them, and they disbanded in August 1984.

== Work outside the group ==
Salvari left in early 1980. After working with Barry White, Robert Palmer and Sheena Easton, he continued in the music industry as a record producer. Mel Gaynor left after their debut album was released to join Simple Minds, and soon after Henri Defoe enjoyed a writing collaboration with Michael Finbarr Murphy.

Bassist Hinds later formed Hindsight with Defoe, and also played bass in the Style Council, as well as forming the Walkers with trumpet player Canute Wellington, and releasing "(Whatever Happened to) the Party Groove" / "Sky's the Limit" in 1983.

== Later years ==
Le Mesurier died in Spain in the 1990s from an accidental drug overdose.

Beckles died in London from complications of pneumonia on 3 April 2015. He was 59. His son is footballer Omar Beckles of Leyton Orient.

Lipson Francis died on 29 June 2018.

In 2025, a version of the band played live again.

== Original members ==
- Steve Salvari – Vocals, keyboards
- Camelle Hinds – Vocals, bass
- Lipson Francis – Vocals, keyboards
- Henri Defoe – Vocals, guitar
- Jake Le Mesurier – Drums, percussion
- Linton Beckles – Vocals, percussion
- Mel Gaynor – Drums, percussion
- Michael Finbarr Murphy – Guitars, keyboards
- Roy Carter – Keyboards, guitar
- Steve Jeffries – Keyboards
- George Chandler – Backup vocals
- Dee Sealy – Backup vocals
- Jimmy Chambers – Backup vocals

== Discography ==
=== Albums ===
Year	Title	Label	Chart positions		
Year	Title	Label	US	US R&B	UK
1981	Central Line	Mercury Records	145	32	—
1981	Breaking Point	Mercury Records	—	—	64
1983	Choice	Mercury Records	—	—	—
"—" denotes releases that did not chart or were not released in that territory.

=== Singles ===
Year	Title	Chart positions			
Year	Title	US Pop	US R&B	US Dance	UK
1979	"Wot We Got (It's Hot)"	—	—	—	—
1980	"Sticks & Stones"	—	—	—	—
1980	"You Can Do It (You Know)"	—	—	—	67
1981	"That's No Way to Treat My Love"	—	—	—	—
1981	"Walking into Sunshine"	84	14	5	42
1982	"Don't Tell Me"	—	—	—	55
1982	"You've Said Enough"	—	54	11	58
1982	"Nature Boy"	—	—	—	21
1983	"Surprise Surprise"	—	—	—	48
1983	"Time for Some Fun"	—	49	39	99
1983	"Lovely Day"	—	—	—	81
1984	"Betcha Gonna"	—	—	—	—
"—" denotes releases that did not chart or were not released in that territory.
