= I Love My Bitch =

"I Love My Chick"

Single by Busta Rhymes featuring Kelis and will.i.am

from the album The Big Bang
- Released: June 6, 2006
- Recorded: 2006
- Length: 3:47
- Label: Aftermath; Interscope
- Songwriters: Trevor Smith Jr.; William Adams; Keith Harris
- Producer: will.i.am

Busta Rhymes singles chronology
"Touch It" (remix) (2006)	"I Love My Chick" (2006)	"New York Shit" (2006)

will.i.am singles chronology
"Beep" (2006)	"I Love My Chick" (2006)	"Fergalicious" (2006)

Kelis singles chronology
"Bossy" (2006)	"I Love My Chick" (2006)	"Blindfold Me" (2006)

"I Love My Bitch" known as "I Love My Chick" in its edited version is a song by Busta Rhymes featuring will.i.am (who also produced the track) and Kelis, released as the second single from Busta Rhymes' seventh studio album, The Big Bang (2006).

The release date for the single in the United Kingdom was July 10, 2006. However, due to the UK chart rules allowing songs to chart on download sales alone, one week before the single's physical release, it was Busta Rhymes' second consecutive hit to make the top 40, entering at number 23 on download sales only, the same position that "Touch It" had charted at. Upon its physical release, the single became his second consecutive top ten solo hit, peaking at number eight there, two positions lower than "Touch It" had charted.

== Music video ==
The music video "I Love My Chick" is based on the film Mr. & Mrs. Smith, directed by Benny Boom. Busta Rhymes (a.k.a. Trevor Smith) plays Mr. Smith and Gabrielle Union plays Mrs. Smith. will.i.am and Dr. Dre also appear in the video, but for unknown reasons, Kelis does not. It reached number one on BET's 106 & Park.

== Track listings and formats ==
European CD maxi single

1. "I Love My Chick" (Clean Version)
2. "I Love My Bitch" (Dirty Version)
3. "Touch It" (Ultimate Remix featuring Mary J. Blige, Missy Elliott, DMX, Rah Digga, Lloyd Banks and Papoose)
4. "I Love My Chick" (Video)
5. "I Love My Bitch" (Video)

UK CD single

1. "I Love My Chick" (Clean Version)
2. "Cocaina"

UK 12" single

1. "I Love My Chick" (Clean Version)
2. "I Love My Bitch" (Dirty Version)
3. "Cocaina"

Special UK and European single

1. "I Love My Bitch" (Dirty Version)
2. "Touch It" (Ultimate Remix featuring Mary J. Blige, Missy Elliott, DMX, Rah Digga, Lloyd Banks and Papoose)

== Charts ==
=== Weekly charts ===
Chart (2006)	Peak position
Australia (ARIA)	22
Australian Urban (ARIA)	7
Austria (Ö3 Austria Top 40)	71
Belgium (Ultratip Bubbling Under Flanders)	4
Belgium (Ultratip Bubbling Under Wallonia)	6
Brazil (ABPD)	53
Germany (GfK)	38
Ireland (IRMA)	18
Netherlands (Dutch Top 40)	33
Netherlands (Single Top 100)	43
New Zealand (Recorded Music NZ)	8
Romania (Airplay 100)	54
Scottish Singles Sales (Official Charts)	19
Switzerland (Schweizer Hitparade)	22
UK Singles (Official Charts)	8
UK Hip Hop/R&B (Official Charts)	2
US Billboard Hot 100	41
US Hot R&B/Hip-Hop Songs (Billboard)	18
US Hot Rap Songs (Billboard)	8
US Rhythmic Airplay (Billboard)	16

=== Year-end charts ===
Chart (2006)	Position
UK Singles (OCC)	124
UK Urban (Music Week)	20
US Hot R&B/Hip-Hop Songs (Billboard)	79
