= Black Superman (Muhammad Ali) =

- 7" vinyl single cover

Single by Johnny Wakelin and the Kinshasa Band

from the album Black Superman
- B-side: "In Mazatlan"
- Released: November 15, 1974 (UK); June 28, 1975 (US)
- Recorded: 1974
- Genre: Reggae
- Length: 3:32
- Label: Pye
- Songwriter: Johnny Wakelin
- Producer: Robin Blanchflower

Johnny Wakelin and the Kinshasa Band singles chronology
"Hungarian Superman (Joe Bugner)" (1972)	"Black Superman (Muhammad Ali)" (1974)	"Tennessee Hero (Elvis)" (1975)

"Black Superman (Muhammad Ali)" is a song by English songwriter Johnny Wakelin from his album of the same name. The song reached #7 on the UK Singles Chart and #21 on the Billboard Hot 100 in 1975.

"Black Superman (Muhammad Ali)" is a reggae version of Wakelin's song "Hungarian Superman (Joe Bugner)" (a homage to the Hungarian-born British-Australian boxer by that name) with the lyrics modified to pay tribute to boxer Muhammad Ali.

== Charts ==
=== Weekly charts ===
Chart (1974–75)	Peak position
Australia (Kent Music Report)	7
Canada RPM Top Singles	1
UK Singles Chart	7
US Billboard Hot 100	21

=== Year-end charts ===
Chart (1975)	Rank
Australia (Kent Music Report)	16
