= Mr. Solitaire =

Song
- A-side: "Mr. Solitaire"
- B-side: "Lazy Afternoon"
- Released: 1984
- Length: 5:15 (12")
- Label: Island Records IS 193 (7"), Island Records 12IS 193 (12")
- Composer: Nightlife / Roy Carter
- Producer: Michael Brauer

UK chronology
"Native Boy" (1983)	"Mr. Solitaire" (1984)	"Preacher Preacher" (1985)

"Mr. Solitaire" was a 1984 single for UK group Animal Nightlife. It became a hit for them that year, registering on multiple charts.

== Background ==
"Mr. Solitaire" was the fourth single for Animal Nightlife. It was released in July, 1984. Making the Top 30 chart, it was also the first real success the group had and it got them their first appearance on Top of the Pops. The song was co-written by Roy Carter who also handled the arrangements. Michael Brauer produced the recording. The B side of the single was "Lazy Afternoon".

The song appears on the Video Music 3 compilation that was released in 1984.

== Charts ==
The single made its debut at no 51 in the No 1! Next 25 chart on the week of September 8, 1984. The following week it had dropped off of the Next 25 chart, but it debuted at no. 24 in the magazine's Disco / Dance Singles chart. On the week of September 22, it was back in the Next 25 chart at no. 56. It was also at no. 20 on the Disco / Dance Singles chart. It debuted in the no. 42 in the No. 1 U.K. Singles chart on the week of September 29. On the week of October 13, 1984, the single peaked at no. 24 on the No 1! magazine U.K. Singles chart. At that week, it was also at no. 18 on the magazine's Disco / Dance Singles chart.

During the single's thirteen week run on the National UK chart, it peaked at no. 25.
