= Tammy Jones =

Welsh singer

- Also known as: Helen Wynn
- Born: Helen Wyn Jones; 12 March 1944 (age 82); Bangor, Gwynedd, North Wales
- Genre: Pop
- Instrument: Voice
- Years active: 1960s, 1970s
- Labels: CBS, Epic, Decca Records

Tammy Jones (born Helen Wyn Jones, 12 March 1944), is a Welsh singer from Bangor, Gwynedd, North Wales.

== Background ==
Jones began singing at an early age, winning many Eisteddfod competitions, and was soon established as a regular on both radio and television in her native Wales, singing in both English and Welsh.

Appearances on BBC Wales TV shows such as Hob Y Deri Dando and Clywch, Clywch followed, as well as her own TV show, called Tammy. Her first Welsh record was released in 1965 under the title "Helen Wyn a Hebogiaid y Nos". Then followed a record of duets with Aled Hughes, Caneuon Aled a Helen Wyn.

== Musical career ==
=== 1960s ===
In 1966, she recorded the album Caneuon i'r Plant (Songs for Children) as Helen Wyn, then "Moliannwn"/"Scarlet Ribbons" as Tammy Jones. In 1967, she recorded "Edelweiss"/"All The Love in the World", and the LP The World of Tammy Jones.

In 1968, she recorded the album, Gwenno Penygelli/Twll Bach y Clo. In 1969 she released her first single record on CBS Records: "Lai Lai Lai" / "Pren Helyg" in Welsh, and "Lai Lai Lai" / "Willow Tree" in English.

Throughout the 1960s, Jones worked as a cabaret artiste, performing ballads such as "No Regrets", "My Way" and "The Day That the Rains Came Down". With a voice trained for opera at the Guildhall School of Music, London, this was her forte for many years.

Guest spots followed on English television with Benny Hill, Tom Jones, The Bachelors, Dick Emery and Morecambe and Wise, as well as appearances at the London Palladium and the Royal Variety Performance in front of Princess Anne. Cabaret appearances were both national and international, with visits to Poland, Israel, Zimbabwe, America, Canada, Africa, Europe, Australia, New Zealand and Argentina.

=== 1970s ===
==== "Let Me Try Again" ====
She was ‘discovered’ through the popular ITV talent show, Opportunity Knocks, which she won for six consecutive weeks in 1975. Her participation resulted in the most recorded votes ever on the show. This produced her biggest hit, "Let Me Try Again", which was produced by Robin Blanchflower. It reached No. 5 on the UK Singles Chart. The song was included on her album of the same name.

==== Further activities ====
In 1975, Jones was the best selling UK female artist of the year based on her international record sales.

Working with producer Robin Blanchflower and arranger Alan Tew, Jones recorded "While We're Still Young". Backed with the Blanchflower / Tew composition, "Just You And I", it was released on Epic S EPC 3394 in 1975. It debuted at No. 6 on the Record Mirror Star Breakers chart for the week of 9 August.

In 1976, Jones released a single entitled "Love's A Carousel", a song that she performed in BBC TV's A Song for Europe at the Royal Albert Hall, a competition to select the UK's representative for the Eurovision Song Contest. Competing against Frank Ifield and Tony Christie, Jones finished in sixth place out of the twelve contestants. The winners were Brotherhood of Man, who went on to win the Eurovision title in the final at The Hague with "Save Your Kisses for Me". Jones released an album of the same name soon after, but neither the single nor album made the UK charts.

This was followed up by Jones winning the first Opportunity Knocks satellite show via a television link up with Australia. She had albums released in the UK with 30 piece orchestral backing and, in 1976, was voted the second best female vocalist in Britain.

Jones appeared in summer shows, and played lead roles in pantomimes, with many well known artists such as Les Dawson, Marti Caine, Jim Davidson, Hope and Keen, The Krankies, Craig Douglas and Charlie Drake.

=== Later years ===
After living in New Zealand for over ten years, Jones has now returned to live in Wales.
