= Walking into Sunshine =

Single by Central Line

from the album Breaking Point
- A-side: "Walking into Sunshine"
- B-side: "That's No Way to Treat My Love"
- Released: 1981
- Length: 3:17
- Label: Mercury MER 78
- Composer: (Linton Beckles/Lipson Francis/Roy Carter)
- Producer: Roy Carter

"Walking into Sunshine" is a 1981 single by British band Central Line. It became a hit for the group that year, charting in both the UK and the US.

== Background ==
"Walking into Sunshine" appears to be the earliest example of Roy Carter's songwriting to make the national charts. Carter was a member of Clem Curtis & The Foundations, and while with the band, he composed the song "Amanda" with Valentine Pascal and Georges Delanbanque which was the B side of the single "Make a Wish", released in 1976 on the Riverdale label. He also composed "The Foundations Theme". He was later a member of Heatwave and was with them until 1979. Central Line already had some chart success with "(You Know) You Can Do It". They then collaborated with the former Heatwave guitarist Carter to have him produce "Walking into Sunshine". Carter co-wrote the song with band members; keyboardist Lipson Francis and percussionist Linton C. Beckles.

"Walking into Sunshine " bw "That's No Way to Treat My Love" was released in the UK in 7-inch format on Mercury MER 78. A 12" limited edition Larry Levan special mix was released in the US on Mercury MDS-4013. "Walking into Sunshine" on side 1 was 8:10 long and "Walking into Sunshine" on side 2 was 5:45 long.

The song brought them success. They followed it up with "Don’t Tell Me" which also made the charts.

== Reception ==
According to Barry Lederer's Disco Mix column in the October 17 issue of Billboard, Bo Crane's Musical Report which was compiled by members of the Florida Record Pool had listed "Walking into Sunshine" / "That's No Way to Treat My Love" by Central Line as one of the up-and-coming records in their area.

== Airplay ==
According to the September 12 issue of Billboard, the single was one of the playlist top add-ons at WXLO in New York. It was reported by Cash Box in the Black Radio Highlights section of the October 3 issue that Central Line was getting airplay at WBMX in Chicago. The October 24 issue of Billboard reported the single as a prime mover on the playlist of WKTU-FM in New York City. The October 31 issue of Billboard reported that it was a breakout in the Northeast region, and a top add-on to the playlist of WXKS -FM (KISS- 108) in Boston.

== Charts ==
"Walking into Sunshine" made its debut at no. 72 in the Music Week Top 75 Singles chart on the week of August 15, 1981.

Spending a total of nine weeks in the main UK chart, it peaked at no. 42 on September 9.

On the week of September 26, the 12-inch version of "Walking into Sunshine" (Mercury MDS 4013) made its debut at no. 66 in the Billboard Disco Top 80 chart. The following week, it had moved up to no. 49. The following week it had similar progress, moving up to no. 38. The following week (October 17), the single increased pace, moving up twenty places to no. 18. Having been in the chart for nine weeks, the single reached its peak position of no. 5 on the week of November 21, and held that spot for another week.

The single was at no. 1 on the Cash Box Dance Music chart (October 3) which was based on the top-selling sales of 12-inch records compiled from sales reports of the northeast area of the retailers who specialized in the 12-inch format.

It also charted in the Netherlands Top 40, where it peaked at no. 25 on week 3.

== Popular culture ==
The song appears in video game Grand Theft Auto V on the Space 103.2 radio station.
