= In the Ghetto (Busta Rhymes song) =

Single by Busta Rhymes featuring Rick James

from the album The Big Bang
- Released: 2006
- Recorded: 2005 (archives from 2004, 2001)
- Genre: Hip hop; funk
- Length: 3:53
- Label: Aftermath/Interscope
- Songwriter(s): Rick James
- Producer(s): DJ Green Lantern; Dr. Dre (additional production)

Busta Rhymes singles chronology
"New York Shit" (2006)	"In the Ghetto" (2006)	"Hurt" (2007)

Rick James singles chronology
"You & I" (1992)	"In the Ghetto" (2006)

"In the Ghetto" is the fourth and final single from Busta Rhymes' album The Big Bang, and features R&B singer Rick James. It was produced by DJ Green Lantern and Dr. Dre.

== Song information ==
Busta Rhymes in the outro.

The song samples James' "Ghetto Life" from his Street Songs album. At the end of the song Green Lantern threw in a sample of Rick James at the 2004 BET Awards in which he exclaims, "Never mind who you thought I was... I'm Rick James. Bitch!"

== Music video ==
The video for the song was filmed between July 17–19, 2006, in New York, Baltimore and Los Angeles and was directed by Chris Robinson of HSI Productions. Pre-production and casting by Robin Frank Management, Snoop Dogg, MC Eiht, Westurn Union, Daz Dillinger, Warren G, Spliff Star, Rah Digga, DJ Green Lantern, Papoose and Ty James, the daughter of Rick James, made video cameo appearances.

== Remixes ==
The official remix of the song features Rick James, and Ludacris as a new addition. It contains the original instrumental and the same portions from Rick James, while all the parts from Busta Rhymes and Ludacris are new. It was included in Ludacris' 2006 mixtape, Pre-Release Therapy.

== Charts ==
Chart	Position
US Hot R&B/Hip-Hop Songs (Billboard)	50
