= We in Here =

Single by DMX featuring Swizz Beatz

from the album Year of the Dog… Again
- Released: April 11, 2006
- Recorded: 2005
- Genre: Hardcore hip-hop
- Length: 3:54
- Label: Ruff Ryders; Sony Urban; Columbia
- Songwriter(s): Earl Simmons; Kasseem Dean; Joaquin Dean; Clarence Reid; Willie Clarke
- Producer(s): Swizz Beatz

DMX singles chronology
| "King Thing" (2004) | "We in Here" (2006) | "Lord Give Me a Sign" (2006) |

Swizz Beatz singles chronology
| "Whuteva" (2005) | "We In Here" (2006) | "New York Shit" (2006) |

"We in Here" is a song by American rapper DMX, released in June 2006 as the lead single from his sixth studio album, Year of the Dog... Again (2006). The song features vocals and production from longtime friend and collaborator Swizz Beatz. The song is also known as a diss track towards his old label Def Jam Recordings.

== Background ==
The song was produced by Swizz Beatz, who also contributed vocals on the chorus, various ad-libs between verses, and a short introductory passage at the beginning. The beat contained the trademark Swizz Beatz siren throughout, as well as horn sounds and pounding drums. The song samples Clarence Reid's "Nobody but You Babe".

=== Rihanna diss ===
Towards the end of verse three, a short diss is sent towards Rihanna: "And for the record, what you gonna do to fill up my spot? I ain't gon' front, that Pon de Replay shit was kinda hot, not! How you gonna jack Will Smith for a beat? That's like tryna jack me for the streets! It ain't happenin'!", This was probably because Rihanna signed to Def Jam Recordings, the label DMX left because of creative differences.

== Charts ==
| Chart | Peak position |
|---|---|
| U.S. Billboard Bubbling Under R&B/Hip-Hop Singles | 25 |
| U.S. Billboard Pop 100 | 90 |
