= The Big Bang (Busta Rhymes album) =

Studio album by Busta Rhymes
- Released: June 13, 2006
- Recorded: 2005–06
- Genres: East Coast hip-hop; hardcore hip-hop
- Length: 62:48
- Labels: Flipmode; Violator; Aftermath; Interscope
- Producers: Dr. Dre (also exec.); Busta Rhymes (also exec.); Black Jeruz; DJ Green Lantern; DJ Scratch; J Dilla; Jellyroll; Swizz Beatz; Mark Batson; Mr. Porter; Nisan Stewart; Sha Money XL; Timbaland; will.i.am; Erick Sermon

Busta Rhymes chronology
It Ain't Safe No More (2002)	The Big Bang (2006)	Back on My B.S. (2009)

Singles from The Big Bang
- 1. "Touch It" Released: December 13, 2005; 2. "I Love My Bitch" Released: June 6, 2006; 3. "New York Shit" Released: July 10, 2006; 4. "In the Ghetto" Released: July 13, 2006

The Big Bang is the seventh studio album by American rapper Busta Rhymes. It was released on June 13, 2006, by Aftermath Entertainment, Flipmode Records and Interscope Records. Production for the album took place during 2005 to 2006 at several recording studios and was handled by Dr. Dre, Swizz Beatz, Mark Batson, DJ Scratch, J Dilla, Timbaland, Mr. Porter, will.i.am, Sha Money XL, JellyRoll, Black Jeruz, Nisan Stewart and DJ Green Lantern. The official cover artwork was revealed on May 7, 2006. The tracklisting was released on the 15th.

The album debuted at number one on the US Billboard 200 making it Busta's first number one album, selling 209,000 copies in its first week, and certified gold by RIAA.

== Background ==
The Big Bang is Busta Rhymes's first album without his signature dreadlocks he had for most of his career as he transitioned into a new look with a short Caesar haircut and a muscular physique. It is his only release under Dr. Dre's Aftermath Entertainment record label. Full production of the album came from Dr. Dre, Swizz Beatz, will.i.am, Mr. Porter, Erick Sermon, Green Lantern, Timbaland, J Dilla and DJ Scratch. Featured guests include Nas, Stevie Wonder, Rick James, Kelis, Raekwon, Q-Tip, Missy Elliott, Marsha Ambrosius & LaToiya Williams. Five singles have been released for the album: "Touch It", "Touch It Remix", "I Love My Bitch", "New York Shit" and "In the Ghetto". Music videos were released for all of them. The finalized version of the "Touch It Remix", for which a video was shot, was not included on the final album.

== Reception ==
Professional ratings
Aggregate scores
Source	Rating
Metacritic	64/100
Review scores
Source	Rating
AllMusic	2/5 stars
Entertainment Weekly	A−
HipHopDX	3.5/5 stars
Los Angeles Times	2/4 stars
NME	8/10
Pitchfork	2.4/10
RapReviews	8/10
Rolling Stone	2/5 stars
Uncut	3.5/5 stars
XXL	(XL)

The tracks "I'll Hurt You" featuring Eminem and "Where's Your Money?" featuring Ol' Dirty Bastard both leaked but received lukewarm responses. The first single was "Touch It" and reached number sixteen on the Billboard Hot 100 chart. "Touch It" featuring a sampled portion of Daft Punk's "Technologic", also garnered a major remix. The second single "I Love My Chick" features Kelis and will.i.am. Stevie Wonder plays piano and sings on "Been Through the Storm". The song "Get Down" was featured in the movie "Step Up 2: The Streets" but was not included on the soundtrack.

== Legacy ==
Busta Rhymes was really pleased with the album: "I would not have changed The Big Bang album for the world. It's still one of my if not the favorite album of mine from a lyrical standpoint, a conceptual standpoint and a musical standpoint." He praised the Dr. Dre produced song Legends of the Fall Off for the "gravediggin beat with the shovel in the dirt" calling it "unbelievable". He also praised You Can't Hold a Torch, Don't Get Carried Away and Gold Mine. He also said "The only thing I probably would have changed is I Love My Chick would not have been on that album. I probably would have put "I Love My Chick" on another album that it would have been more appropriate for."

The song Legend of the Fall Offs received further notice from hip-hop fans alike especially for its production. Mitch Findlay from hnhh said: "While hardly a banger in the traditional sense, Dre proves why he's one of hip-hop's most cinematic producers, deftly arranging foley-esque heartbeats and shovels into the mix. Once again, the line between hip-hop and horror are blurred, though few would be quick to hit either Busta or Dre with the “horrorcore” label. Yet “Legend Of The Fall Offs” seems tailor made for an equally disturbing visual component. But why is such a simple beat so evocative? Is it the melodic structure, which employs repetitive use of the same few notes? For whatever reason, the sound of a piano's lowest octave seems to evoke a profound sense of hopelessness. Dr. Dre understands that better than most." On his Dr. Dre's top 10 haunting beats, he said: "A masterclass in minimalism, Dr. Dre closed out Busta Rhyme's Aftermath debut The Big Bang in a truly disturbing fashion. Conjuring imagery of a moonlit cemetery, Busta plays the role of Death himself, ushering in the bleak tidings to those already lost. With a shovel making for the main percussive track, Dre's steady piano and cricket-fueled ambiance cast a spell of existential dread. Throw in a man legitimately pleading for his life in vain, and "Legend Of The Fall Offs" makes for the darkest song of Busta's career."

Dan Weiss from Billboard Magazine said: "Dr. Dre oversaw Busta's 2006 semi-comeback The Big Bang, which ends with an inspired horrorcore piece that uses Dre's dirgelike tendencies to its advantage. While Busta buries an unnamed rival in thick subliminal disses, the beat itself is literally comprised of shovels and dirt, followed by a pretty horrifying skit in which Busta buries a dude alive as the instrumental has foreshadowed the entire time. Gangsta bloodshed is rarely that thrilling or interesting, and ultimately this track could’ve taken on many more dimensions if a thespian like Eminem was at the helm, but hip-hop's never seen anything like it before or since and that alone makes it perfectly Busta."

== Commercial performance ==
The album became Busta's first and only album to debut at number one on the charts with over 209,000 copies sold during the first-week of release. On August 30, 2006, the album was certified gold for shipments of over 500,000 units. The album has sold 823,000 copies as of November 22, 2011 The album became Busta Rhymes' highest-charting album in the UK, debuting on the UK albums chart at number nineteen. His previous highest album peak was #3 for the album When Disaster Strikes, almost ten years before the release of The Big Bang.

== Track listing ==
The Big Bang
No.	Title	Writer(s)	Producer(s)	Length
1.	"Get You Some" (featuring Q-Tip and Marsha Ambrosius)	Trevor Smith; Andre Young; Marsha Ambrosius; Mark Batson; Dawaun Parker; Che Pope	Dr. Dre; Batson	3:45
2.	"Touch It"	T. Smith; Kasseem Dean; Thomas Bangalter; Guy-Manuel de Homem-Christo	Swizz Beatz	3:34
3.	"How We Do It Over Here" (featuring Missy Elliott)	T. Smith; Melissa Elliott; Young; Parker; Pope	Dr. Dre	3:36
4.	"New York Shit" (featuring Swizz Beatz)	T. Smith; George Spivey; K. Dean; Douglas Lucas; Francois Weyer	DJ Scratch	5:22
5.	"Been Through the Storm" (featuring Stevie Wonder)	T. Smith; Michael Clervoix; Robert Smith; Devone Vines; Felix Cavaliere; Carman Moore	Sha Money XL; Black Jeruz; Dr. Dre^{[a]}; Busta Rhymes^{[b]}	4:06
6.	"In the Ghetto" (featuring Rick James)	James	DJ Green Lantern; Dr. Dre^{[a]}	3:53
7.	"Cocaina" (featuring Marsha Ambrosius)	T. Smith; Ambrosius; Young; Batson; Mike Elizondo; Pope	Dr. Dre; Batson	3:32
8.	"You Can't Hold the Torch" (featuring Q-Tip and Chauncey Black)	T. Smith; Kamaal Fareed; James Yancey; Minnie Riperton; Leon Ware; Richard Rudolph	J Dilla	3:39
9.	"Goldmine" (featuring Raekwon)	T. Smith; Erick Sermon; Corey Woods	Sermon; Dr. Dre^{[a]}	3:45
10.	"I Love My Bitch" (featuring will.i.am and Kelis)	T. Smith; William Adams; Keith Harris	will.i.am	3:47
11.	"Don't Get Carried Away" (featuring Nas)	T. Smith; Nasir Jones; Young; Lionel Holoman; Parker	Dr. Dre	3:30
12.	"They're Out to Get Me" (featuring Mr. Porter)	T. Smith; Denaun Porter	Mr. Porter	5:02
13.	"Get Down"	T. Smith; Timothy Mosley; Nisan Stewart	Timbaland; Stewart	3:40
14.	"I'll Do It All" (featuring LaToiya Williams)	T. Smith; David Drew	Jellyroll	5:02
15.	"Legend of The Fall Offs"	T. Smith; Young; Gayle Moran	Dr. Dre	4:40
Total length:				62:48

Leftover Tracks

- "Touch It (Remix)" (featuring Mary J. Blige, Rah Digga, Missy Elliott, Lloyd Banks, Papoose and DMX)
- "Where's Your Money?" (featuring Ol' Dirty Bastard)
- "Rough Around the Edges" (featuring Nas)
- "I'll Hurt You" (featuring Eminem)
- "Always Love Thy Family" (featuring Yummy Bingham)
- "The Big Bang"
- "You Know About Me" (featuring Spliff Star)
- "Easily I Approach" (featuring Spliff Star)
- "I Knock You Out" (featuring The Notorious B.I.G.)

Notes

- ^{^[a]} signifies an additional producer
- ^{^[b]} signifies an orchestra producer

Sample credits

- "Touch It" samples "Technologic" by Daft Punk.
- "Been Through the Storm" samples "Everlasting Love" by Felix Cavaliere.
- "In the Ghetto" samples "Ghetto Life" by Rick James.
- "You Can't Hold the Torch" samples "Inside My Love" by Minnie Riperton.
- "Goldmine" samples "Love and Happiness" by Al Green.
- "Legend of the Fall Offs" samples "Do You Ever" by Return to Forever.
- "New York Shit" samples "Faded Lady" by SSO.

== Credits ==
- "Get You Some"
  - Keyboards: Mark Batson
- "How We Do It Over Here"
  - Keyboards: Dawaun Parker & Che Vicious
- "Been Through the Storm"
  - Arranger: Jose A. Molina
  - Conductor: Jose A. Molina
  - Orchestra Production: Busta Rhymes
  - Keyboards: Mark Batson, Dawaun Parker & Mike Elizondo
  - Cellos: Christopher Glansdorp, Claudio Jaffe, David W. Cole & Ross T. Harbaugh
  - Violins: Alfredo Oliva, Carol A. T. Cole, Dina Kostic, Geremy C. Miller, Glen Basham, Gustavo A. Correa, Huifang Chen, Joan E. Faigen, John DiPuccio, Kurt Coble, Lazlo Pap, Mei Mei Luo, Orlando J. Forte, Scott Flavin, Tina M. Raimondi & Yien Hung
- "In the Ghetto"
  - Saxophone: Jason Freese
  - Trombone: Francisco Torres
  - Trumpet: Ron Blake
  - Horn Arrangements: Dawaun Parker
  - Additional keyboards: Dawaun Parker
- "Cocaina"
  - Keyboards: Mark Batson
  - Guitar: Mike Elizondo
  - Additional keyboards: Che Vicious
- "You Can't Hold the Torch"
  - Additional Keyboards: Dawaun Parker
  - Scratching: Busta Rhymes
- "Goldmine"
  - Additional Keyboards: Dawaun Parker & Che Vicious
- "I Love My Bitch"
  - Moog Bass: will.i.am
  - Drums: will.i.am
  - Bass: Keith Harris
  - Fender Rhodes: Keith Harris
  - Synthesizer: Keith Harris
  - Clarinet: Keith Harris
- "Don't Get Carried Away"
  - Keyboards: Lionel Holoman & Dawaun Parker
- "Legend of The Fall Offs"
  - Keyboards: Dawaun Parker

== Charts ==
=== Weekly charts ===
Chart (2006)	Peak position
Australian Albums (ARIA)	42
Austrian Albums (Ö3 Austria)	29
Belgian Albums (Ultratop Flanders)	43
Belgian Albums (Ultratop Wallonia)	42
Canadian Albums (Billboard)	6
Dutch Albums (Album Top 100)	27
French Albums (SNEP)	18
German Albums (Offizielle Top 100)	10
Italian Albums (FIMI)	60
New Zealand Albums (RMNZ)	11
Scottish Albums (Official Charts)	31
Swiss Albums (Schweizer Hitparade)	6
UK Albums (Official Charts)	19
UK R&B Albums (Official Charts)	1
US Billboard 200	1
US Top R&B/Hip-Hop Albums (Billboard)	1
US Top Rap Albums (Billboard)	1

=== Year-end charts ===
Chart (2006)	Position
US Billboard 200	106
US Top R&B/Hip-Hop Albums (Billboard)	23

== Certifications ==
Region	Certification	Certified units/sales
United Kingdom (BPI)	Silver	60,000^{^}
United States (RIAA)	Gold	823,000
^{^} Shipments figures based on certification alone.
