= Steve McDonald (Celtic music) =

New Zealand singer (born 1950)

Steve McDonald (born 9 September 1950) is a New Zealand composer, singer, and instrumentalist who performs in the Celtic fusion musical style. He performed in rock bands Timberjack, Dizzy Limits, and Human Instinct before embarking on a solo career. He has composed musical scores for television shows and documentaries. Beginning in the early 1990s, McDonald has explored his Scottish heritage through a series of Celtic recordings. He is published on the Etherean Music music label.

== Solo albums ==
- Spinfield (Hearts of Space Records)
- Sons of Somerled
- Stone of Destiny (album)
- Winter in Scotland: A Highland Christmas
- The Message (Steve McDonald album)
- Highland Farewell
- Legend (Steve McDonald album)
