= New York Shit =

2006 single by Busta Rhymes

Single by Busta Rhymes featuring Swizz Beatz

from the album The Big Bang
- Released: July 10, 2006
- Recorded: 2006
- Genre: Hip-hop; East Coast hip-hop
- Length: 3:01
- Label: Aftermath; Interscope
- Songwriters: Trevor Smith; Kasseem Dean; George Spivey; Douglas Lucas; Francois Weyer
- Producer: DJ Scratch

Busta Rhymes singles chronology
"I Love My Bitch" (2006)	"New York Shit" (2006)	"In the Ghetto" (2006)

Swizz Beatz singles chronology
"We in Here" (2006)	"New York Shit" (2006)	"It's Me Bitches" (2007)

"New York Shit" is a song by American rapper Busta Rhymes, released July 10, 2006 as the third single from his seventh studio album The Big Bang (2006). The song, produced by DJ Scratch, contains a sample of "Faded Lady" by Soul Sensation Orchestra. Additionally, the song features vocals from Swizz Beatz, a longtime collaborator of Busta Rhymes.

== Music video ==
The music video for the song, directed by Benny Boom, features scenes of Busta Rhymes performing live in HOT 97's Summer Jam on June 4, 2006, and shows various places of New York City, including cameo appearances by fellow NYC acts such as Rakim, Q-Tip, Slick Rick, and RZA, among others, as well as images of deceased artists, namely the Notorious B.I.G., Big Pun, Ol' Dirty Bastard, and Jam Master Jay.

== Remixes ==
- Roll My Shit - Curren$y
- A.D.D. Pt.2 - Wale
- New Jerz Shit (Remix) - Joe Budden
- Return of the Mac (a.k.a. New York Shit) - Prodigy
- New York Shit (Marley Marl Remix) (featuring KRS-One)
- New York Shit (Freestyle) - Mashonda
- New York Shit (Remix) (featuring Swizz Beatz, Nas, Papoose, Labba and M.O.P.)
- Down South Shit (featuring Slim Thug, Three 6 Mafia and Rick Ross)
- Dade County Shit (featuring Pitbull, Smitty and C-Ride)
- L.A. Shit - Jay Rock (featuring Kendrick Lamar)
- BK Shit - Gravy and A-Smash
- New York Shit (Legend Remix) (featuring Rakim, DMX and Jadakiss) (Unofficial, consists of verses from other songs, like The Watcher)
- H-Town Shit - Brooke Valentine (featuring Bun B)
- London Shit - Pyrelli
- Midwest Shit (featuring Kanye West, Lupe Fiasco, Common and Twista)
- New York Shit (Freestyle) - Hi-Tek
- New York Shit (featuring Jean Grae and Talib Kweli)
- LIve My LIfe (featuring StarRJ The Feenom and Lo)
- Tokyo Shit - Kashi Da Handsome
- Manchester Shit - Broke'n'English
- P.A. Shit - Freeway
- JA Shit - The Bulletproof Army
- Miami Shit - Rick Ross
- GolfBoyShit - Tyler, the Creator

== Charts ==
Chart (2006)	Peak position
US Hot R&B/Hip-Hop Songs (Billboard)	77
