= While We're Still Young =

"While We're Still Young" is a single by Paul Anka. It was a chart hit for him. It has been recorded several times by other artists who have had varying degrees of success with it. "While We're Still Young" was composed by Eric Charden, Yves Dessca and Paul Anka.

== Paul Anka version ==
"While We're Still Young"

Song by Paul Anka
- A-side: "While We're Still Young"
- B-side: "This Is Your Song"
- Released: 1972
- Length: 3:56
- Label: Buddah BDA-337
- Composer: Anka/Couckroun
- Producer: Arif Mardin

=== Background ===
Working with producer Arif Mardin, Paul Anka recorded "While We're Still Young". Backed with Anka's composition, "This Is Your Song", it was released on Buddah BDA-337 in 1972.

=== Charts ===
in Canada, "While We're Still Young" debuted at No. 96 on the RPM Weekly RPM 100 Singles chart and No. 63 on the RPM Weekly Adult Contemporary Playlist for the week of 3 March 1973. It peaked at No. 61 on the RPM 100 Singles chart for the week of 21 April. It peaked at No. 8 on the RPM Weekly Adult Contemporary Playlist for the week of 28 April.

== Wayne Newton version ==
"While We're Still Young"

Song by Wayne Newton

from the album While We're Still Young
- A-side: "While We're Still Young"
- B-side: "Just Yesterday"
- Published: 1973
- Length: 4:03
- Label: Chelsea 78-0116
- Composer: (P. Anka-R. Chackroun)

=== Background ===
Working with producer Wes Farrell and arranger John Bahler, Wayne Newton recorded his version of "While We're Still Young". Backed with "Just Yesterday", it was released on Chelsea 78-0116 in 1973. It is included on Newton's While We're Still Young album. It was reported in the 10 March 1973 issue of Record World that Newton had released his version of Paul Anka's song "While We're Still Young" on the Chelsea label.

=== Charts ===
In the US, Newton's version of "While We're Still Young" peaked at No. 107 in the Billboard Bubbling Under the Hot 100 chart and No. 121 on the Record World 101 - 150 singles chart for the week of 10 March 1973.

== Tammy Jones version ==
"While We're Still Young"

Song by Tammy Jones

from the album Let Me Try Again
- A-side: "While We're Still Young"
- B-side: "Just You And I"
- Released: 1975
- Length: 3:06
- Label: Epic S EPC 3394
- Composer: (Paul Anka/Dessca/Sharder)
- Producer: Robin Blanchflower

=== Background ===
Working with producer Robin Blanchflower and arranger Alan Tew, Tammy Jones recorded "While We're Still Young". Backed with the Blanchflower / Tew composition, "Just You And I", it was released on Epic S EPC 3394 in 1975. The song appears on her Let Me Try Again album.

=== Charts ===
It debuted at No. 6 on the Record Mirror Star Breakers chart for the week of 9 August.
