= Lord Give Me a Sign =

Single by DMX

from the album Year of the Dog... Again
- Released: August 21, 2006
- Recorded: 2006
- Genre: Christian hip-hop
- Length: 3:28
- Label: Ruff Ryders; Sony Urban; Columbia
- Songwriter(s): E. Simmons; S. Storch
- Producer(s): Scott Storch

DMX singles chronology
"We in Here" (2006)	"Lord Give Me a Sign" (2006)	"Come Thru' (Move)" (2006)

"Lord Give Me a Sign" is a song by American rapper DMX, released as the second single from his sixth studio album Year of the Dog... Again (2006).

== Song information ==
Even though the album's cover has the RIAA Parental Advisory sticker, this song is entirely free of profanity. This is most likely due to DMX's reputation. DMX has since decided to return to rap after being encouraged by Mase to wait for God's calling to do so. It is also rumored that DMX made this song because he needs a sign to preach or stay rapping. The song was produced by Scott Storch.

=== Meaning ===
The song is about how DMX struggles with "trials and tribulations" throughout his life, all the while seeking strength from God to win the battles he faces.

=== Music video ===
The video of the song shows DMX in a desert, perhaps trying to reenact the story of how Jesus spent forty days and nights in the desert. It also shows pictures of hurricane stricken Louisiana and other emotive images.

== In popular culture ==
- The song has been used as the main theme for DMX: Soul of a Man.
- It has been featured in advertisements for the CBS television series The Unit
- In the trailer for the movie Alpha Dog.
- This song is also featured in an episode in season 4 of The Wire
- In episode 15 ("Blinders") in season 1 of Friday Night Lights.
- The song was played during the end credits of the 2009 film Not Easily Broken.

== Charts ==
Chart (2006)	Peak position
Germany (GfK)	31
Switzerland (Schweizer Hitparade)	65
UK Singles (OCC)	111
US Bubbling Under Hot 100 (Billboard)	22
US Hot R&B/Hip-Hop Songs (Billboard)	70
