= Animal Nightlife =

UK musical group

- Origin: United Kingdom
- Genres: Pop, jazz
- Years active: 1980–1988
- Labels: Innervision, Island, Virgin
- Past members: Andy Polaris (vocalist); Leonardo Chignoli (bassist); Steve Brown (guitarist); Billy Chapman (saxophonist); Paul Waller (drummer)

Animal Nightlife was a British group in the 1980s. It consisted of Andy Polaris on vocals, Leonardo Chignoli on bass, Steve Brown on guitar, Billy Chapman on saxophone and Paul Waller on drums.

== History ==
Founded in 1980 in the London night club scene, their sound has been described as white funk or cool jazz – a 1980s dance sound that is rooted in blues, soul, R&B and jazz.

They are described by one reviewer as "a staunchly Labour collective" whose instrumentals tended to impart escapism.

The group started as friends who enjoyed the nightlife at various clubs, including Blitz and Le Beat Route. They decided to create a group with their "love of swing, jazz, and funk", but needed a lead vocalist. They joined up with Andy Polaris, who at the time was Boy George's roommate. By 1983, they had opened for bands like Blue Rondo à la Turk and gained a following in gay clubs.

Their debut single, "Love Is Just The Great Pretender" and the follow-up "Native Boy", came out on the Innervision label. The latter entered the UK Singles Chart at Number 60 in 1983.

In August 1984, they reached Number 25 with "Mr. Solitaire", their most successful release. They hit the chart again in July 1985 with a re-recording of "Love is Just the Great Pretender", which reached Number 28.

Their first album, Shangri-La, was released on Island Records a month later in August 1985. The band ended its recording career in 1988 after the release of their second non-compilation album, Lush Life, on Virgin subsidiary 10 Records. A "best of" album was released on the Music Club label in 2000.

In November 2016, Shangri-la was re-issued in a deluxe two-CD edition by Cherry Red.

Frontman Andy Polaris resurfaced in 2013 creating fashionable window displays in Dalston's Oxfam shop.

== Discography ==
=== Albums ===
==== 1985: Shangri-La ====
1. "Native Boy"
2. "Waiting for the Bait to Bite"
3. "Perfect Match"
4. "Love is Just the Great Pretender '85"
5. "Insomniazz"
6. "Lazy Afternoon"
7. "Between Lovers"
8. "After Hours"
9. "Basic Ingredients"
10. "Throw in the Towel"
11. "Bittersweet"
12. "Mr Solitaire"

Shangri-la was released on Island Records (ILPS 9830). It entered the UK Albums Chart on 24 August 1985, and remained in the chart for six weeks, reaching number 36. The original vinyl release did not include 'Lazy Afternoon' or 'Mr Solitaire'.

The 2016 re-release featured 10 songs on each disc, with disc 2 having several remixes.

==== 1987: The Right Stuff / Tu Menti / Boys with the Best Intentions (DJ edit) ====
This 1987 release was a three track compilation album with only the third track by Animal Nightlife.

1. "The Right Stuff" by Bryan Ferry
2. "Tu Menti" by CCCP - Fedeli Alla Linea
3. "Boys with the Best Intentions" (DJ edit) by Animal Nightlife

The album was released by Virgin Records.

==== 1988: Lush Life ====
1. "Why Couldn't Your Black Heart Tell a White Lie"
2. "Always Your Humble Slave"
3. "TV Scene"
4. "Sweet Smell of Success"
5. "Boys With the Best Intentions"
6. "Luck"
7. "The War I Lost"
8. "Mouth"
9. "Last Hotel of the World"
10. "Breakaway"

==== 2000: Unleashed - The Best of Animal Nightlife ====
This CD was released on the Music Club label and featured 17 tracks.

1. "Mr. Solitaire"
2. "Preacher, Preacher"
3. "Love is Just the Great Pretender '85"
4. "After Hours"
5. "Between Lovers"
6. "Native Boy"
7. "Lazy Afternoon"
8. "I Was Yours But It's All Over Now (Throw In The Towel)"
9. "Basic Ingredients"
10. "Waiting For The Bait To Bite"
11. "Perfect Match"
12. "Insominazz"
13. "Who's Fooling Who"
14. "Bittersweet"
15. "You've Lost Me"
16. "Girl at Large"
17. "Mr. Solitaire" (US Remix)

=== Singles ===
==== 1983: Native Boy ====
Released on Inner Vision label in 1983, the single had two mixes of "Native Boy".

1. "Native Boy" (Cosmopolitan Mix)
2. "Native Boy" (Metropolitan Mix)

==== 1983: The Mighty Hands of Love ====
Released on Inner Vision label in 1983, the single had two versions of "The Mighty Hands of Love".

1. "The Mighty Hands of Love" (parts 1 & 2)
2. "The Mighty Hands of Love" (Perversion)

The labels on the record refer to track 2 as the "Mighty Mix" as opposed to the "Perversion" that's listed on the sleeve.

==== 1984: Mr. Solitaire ====
Released by Island Records, this single featured one track on Side A and one on Side B.

1. "Mr. Solitaire"
2. "Lazy Afternoon"

==== 1985: Say You, Say Me / Preacher Preacher ====
Released by Ricordi, the record featured Lionel Richie on side A with Animal Nightlife on Side B.

1. "Say You, Say Me" by Lionel Richie
2. "Preacher, Preacher" by Animal Nightlife

==== 1985: Part Time Lover / Love is Just the Great Pretender ====
Also released by Ricordi, the record featured Stevie Wonder on Side A and Animal Nightlife on Side B.

1. "Part Time Lover" by Stevie Wonder
2. "Love is Just the Great Pretender" by Animal Nightlife

==== 1987: Boys with the Best Intentions ====
Recorded in 1987, it features two versions of "Boys with the Best intentions".

1. "Boys with the Best Intentions"
2. "Boys with the Best Intentions" (Dub version)

==== In the charts ====
Animal Nightlife had four singles in the UK Singles Chart during the 1980s.

Date of chart entry	Title	Label and reference	Highest position	Weeks on chart
13 August 1983	"Native Boy (Uptown)"	Innervision A3584	60	3
18 August 1984	"Mr. Solitaire"	Island Records IS 193	25	12
6 July 1985	"Love Is Just the Great Pretender"	Island Records IS 200	28	6
5 October 1985	"Preacher, Preacher"	Island Records IS 245	67	1

=== EPs ===
==== 1985: Preacher, Preacher ====
Released on Island Records, the EP featured 3 tracks.

1. "Preacher, Preacher"
2. "Bitterwseet"
3. "Preacher, Preacher" (Altered)

==== 1988: Always Your Humble Slave ====
Released on Virgin records, the EP featured 4 tracks.

1. "Always Your Humble Slave" (7" version)
2. "Boys with the Best Intentions" (12" version)
3. "Always Your Humble Slave" (Big Bang)
4. "Badlands"

== Band members ==
- Andy Polaris - vocals (1980–1988)
- Sally Gissing - vocals (1980–1981)
- Lynn Harding - vocals (1980–1981)
- Leah Seresin - vocals (1981–1983)
- Chrysta Jones - vocals (1981–1983)
- Billy Chapman - saxophone (1980–1988)
- Declan John Barclay - trumpet (1980–1983)
- Steve Brown - guitar (1980–1988)
- Steve Shanley - bass (1980–1983)
- Leonardo Chignoli - bass (1984–1988)
- Michael "Mac" McDermott - percussion (1980–1983)
- Dee C. Lee - vocals (occasional)
- Marc "Yellowcoat" Kingman - backing vocals (occasional)
- Paul Waller - drums (1980–1986)
