= Year of the Dog... Again =

Studio album by DMX
- Released: August 1, 2006
- Recorded: 2005–May 2006
- Genres: Hardcore hip-hop; East Coast hip-hop; gangsta rap; gospel rap
- Length: 54:26
- Labels: Ruff Ryders; Columbia; Sony Urban
- Producers: Swizz Beatz; Chad Elliott; Eddie "Shy Boogs" Timmons; Dame Grease; Scott Storch; Shok; Teflon; Elite; Sean Garrett

DMX chronology
Grand Champ (2003)	Year of the Dog... Again (2006)	The Definition of X: The Pick of the Litter (2007)

Singles from Year of the Dog... Again
- 1. "We in Here" Released: April 11, 2006; 2. "Lord Give Me a Sign" Released: September 3, 2006

Professional ratings
Aggregate scores
Source	Rating
Metacritic	60/100
Review scores
Source	Rating
AllMusic	2.5/5 stars
The A.V. Club	B−
Entertainment Weekly	B
The Guardian	3/5 stars
Now	3/5 stars
RapReviews	6/10
Rolling Stone	3/5 stars
Spin	1/5 stars
Stylus Magazine	B+
XXL	L (3/5)

Year of the Dog... Again is the sixth studio album by American rapper DMX. It was released on August 1, 2006, by Ruff Ryders Entertainment, Sony Urban Music, and Columbia Records. The album was mostly produced by Swizz Beatz, Scott Storch, with additional production by others. It features guest appearances from Busta Rhymes, Styles P, Amerie, and Jadakiss.

Year of the Dog... Again was supported by two singles: "We in Here" and "Lord Give Me a Sign". The album received generally positive to mixed reviews from music critics but was a moderate commercial success. It debuted at number two on the US Billboard 200 and number one on the US Top R&B/Hip-Hop Albums charts, selling 125,000 copies in its first week. It became DMX's first album to not debut at number one on the Billboard 200.

== Critical reception ==
At Metacritic, the album got a score of 60 out of 100 based on "mixed or average reviews". XXL gave it an "L" score equivalent to three stars out of five and stated, "Clearly, X's poetic touch remains intact. But Year of the Dog relies too heavily on nostalgia, ignoring how hip-hop and DMX himself have changed over the years. Lyrically, the project sounds as if the Dog has been living in isolation for years, rarely shifting from his trademark style. Sadly, if X doesn't learn a few new tricks, things might never be the same…again." HipHopDX gave it a score of 2.5 out of 5 and said, "The album fairly consistent of what DMX has become - lost. Much like his outlandish antics and brushes with the law, X is all over the place on wax, battling incoherence and sane thinking." AllHipHop gave it a score of three-and-a-half out of five stars and said, "DMX is flawless as DMX. He has carved his own niche, perfecting his brand of unfiltered aggression. Legions of DMX loyalist will not be disappointed." About.com also gave it a score of three-and-a-half out of five stars and said, "Despite all the crises occurring in X's personal life, he still finds a way to preserve the breadth and depth of his powerful voice; his voice alone is capable of propelling the album. While the canine theme is hard to mistake, forgiveness, redemption and, ultimately, the presence of a supreme being present themselves as a subtext in X's canine mind. It seems like the dog has found his way home, finally."

== Commercial performance ==
Year of the Dog... Again debuted at number two on the US Billboard 200 chart, selling 126,000 copies in first week, debuting behind NOW 22. This became DMX's sixth US top-ten album and his first album to not debut at number one. In its second week, the album dropped to number nine on the chart, selling an additional 47,000 copies. As of September 2012, the album has sold 346,000 copies in the United States.

== Track listing ==
Credits adapted from the album's liner notes.

No.	Title	Writer(s)	Producer(s)	Length
1.	"Intro"	Earl Simmons; Damon Blackman	Dame Grease	1:32
2.	"We in Here" (featuring Swizz Beatz)	Simmons; Kasseem Dean; Joaquin Dean	Swizz Beatz	3:54
3.	"I Run Shit" (featuring Big Stan)	Simmons; K. Dean; Dennis Joyner	Swizz Beatz	3:56
4.	"Come Thru (Move)" (featuring Busta Rhymes)	Simmons; K. Dean; Trevor Smith	Swizz Beatz	3:42
5.	"It's Personal" (featuring Jadakiss and Styles P)	Simmons; Jason Phillips; David Styles; Eriberio Serrano; Franklin Crum	The Tuneheadz	3:44
6.	"Baby Motha" (featuring Janyce)	Simmons; K. Dean; Felton Pilate	Swizz Beatz	4:41
7.	"Dog Love" (featuring Amerie and Janyce)	Simmons; Chad Elliott; Eddie Timmons; Amerie Rogers; Siedah Garrett; Clif Magness	Chad "Dr. Ceuss" Elliott; Eddie "Shy Boogs" Timmons	3:42
8.	"Wrong or Right? (I'm Tired)" (featuring Bazaar Royale)	Simmons; Christopher Sanford; Hanan Rubinstein; Anthony Parrino	Elite	5:24
9.	"Give 'Em What They Want"	Simmons; Scott Storch	Scott Storch	2:46
10.	"Walk These Dogs" (featuring Kashmir)	Simmons; Blackman; Ellen Lomax; LeRoy Bell; Casey James	Dame Grease	2:56
11.	"Blown Away" (featuring Jinx and Janyce)	Simmons; Stonewall Odom; Patrick Gallo; Steve McDonald	Divine Bars	4:02
12.	"Goodbye"	Simmons; Brian Palmer; Sergio Moore; Lesette Wilson	Da Gutta Fam	4:50
13.	"Life Be My Song"	Simmons; Blackman	Dame Grease	4:02
14.	"The Prayer VI"	Simmons	DMX	1:30
15.	"Lord Give Me a Sign"	Simmons; Storch	Scott Storch	3:28

Sample credits

- "We in Here" contains samples of "Nobody But You Babe," written by Willie Clarke and Clarence Reid, as performed by Clarence Reid.
- "Baby Motha" contains a sample of "(Let Me Put) Love On Your Mind", written by Felton Pilate, as performed by Con Funk Shun.
- "Walk These Dogs" contains samples of "Set Me Free", written by LeRoy Bell and Casey James, as performed by Teddy Pendergrass.
- "Blown Away" contains samples from "Light From A Distant Shore" and "Fallen Flowers", written by Steve McDonald, as performed by Hollie Smith.

== Charts ==
=== Weekly charts ===
Chart (2006)	Peak position
Australian Albums (ARIA)	70
Australian Urban Albums (ARIA)	8
Austrian Albums (Ö3 Austria)	23
Belgian Albums (Ultratop Flanders)	39
Belgian Albums (Ultratop Wallonia)	67
Canadian Albums (Billboard)	4
Dutch Albums (Album Top 100)	70
French Albums (SNEP)	43
German Albums (Offizielle Top 100)	7
Irish Albums (IRMA)	15
New Zealand Albums (RMNZ)	37
Scottish Albums (Official Charts)	31
Swiss Albums (Schweizer Hitparade)	7
UK Albums (Official Charts)	22
UK R&B Albums (Official Charts)	4
US Billboard 200	2
US Top R&B/Hip-Hop Albums (Billboard)	1
US Top Rap Albums (Billboard)	1

=== Year-end charts ===
Chart (2006)	Position
US Top R&B/Hip-Hop Albums (Billboard)	70

== Certifications and sales ==
Region	Certification	Certified units/sales
Russia (NFPF)	Gold	10,000^{*}
^{*} Sales figures based on certification alone.
