= Caravelli =

French musician

Caravelli (born Claude Vasori; 12 September 1930 – 1 April 2019) was a French orchestra leader, composer and arranger of orchestral music.

== Biography ==
He was born on 12 September 1930 in Paris. The son of an Italian father and a French mother, Vasori was initially instructed in music by his mother in piano and voicing/harmony at seven years old, and later, when he was thirteen he began to attend the Paris Conservatoire. At twenty he was professionally touring, accompanying singers on piano, and at 26 years old he started as an orchestra conductor.

Vasori took his stage name in 1956 from the newly introduced twin-jet Caravelle from Sud Aviation. This plane was the first jet created for the short-haul market. The first Caravelle entered service for Air France on May 9, 1959. He made it more Italianate in honor of his father's origins, changing the last letter: “CARAVELLI et son Violons Magiques/& his Magnificent Strings”.

In 1959 with the help of the French jazz musician Ray Ventura, he obtained a contract to form his own orchestra oriented to popular music. He signed a contract with the French record label Versailles. His first album Dance Party was recorded. Under licenses these early recordings were released internationally (20th Century Records in the USA, Ariel in Argentina, Fermata in Brazil, and Discophon in Spain). In 1962, he composed Et Satan conduit le bal original soundtrack under his real name, French film starred by young Catherine Deneuve. In 1963, he composed "Accroche-toi Caroline!" which was used by the BBC as the theme to the Vision On television series.

The Versailles label was acquired by Columbia Records in 1964. The wider distribution of their product led to gold records in France, Japan, Israel and South America. In Brazil his first released CBS album was titled Voyage Musical, in Argentina Merci Cherie.

With his orchestra he also made recordings with Maurice Chevalier and Charles Trenet (La mer/Beyond the Sea) among other singers. In 1970 he composed the music for the film L'Homme Qui Vient De La Nuit, starred by Ivan Rebroff, and in the same period recorded an album in USA. His first Japan Live Concert is recorded in 1972 by CBS.

In 1973, one of his own compositions was included in the Frank Sinatra album Ol' Blue Eyes Is Back: “Laisse moi le temps” / “Let Me Try Again”, original French lyrics by Michel Jourdan, English lyrics by Paul Anka. This song was previously presented in competition at the Festival Internacional de la Canción de Viña del Mar, Chile, by singer Romuald representing France and obtaining the second prize (a Chile song was the winner), although it was considered the best song by critics and people. Making a delayed justice, a few years ago, it was proclaimed the Best Song in the history of this Festival, in its 41st Anniversary, something unusual for a non-first prize in any song contest. This song was also covered by Raymond Lefevre.

In 1978, he composed and recorded the title song of "Goldorak et les 2 Mazingers", for the Japan anime/cartoon. In 1981 he toured the Soviet Union with his orchestra performing in Riga and Moscow with great success (all concerts were sold out). The summer of following year, he returned to the country, this time to make a record for the Melodiya label with Russians musicians and female singers (in his style without lyrics). This record In Moscow included 12 tracks, the majority written by young pop Russian composers, with a couple of traditional tunes. Two of the pieces were recorded in Paris with his own orchestra. In 1983 Caravelli plays Seiko Matsuda was recorded in Japan.

In the middle 1980s, in order to update his sound he used rhythm arrangements by his son Patrick Vasori (born c.1950) using musicians such as Gilles Gambus and Serge Planchon, who also played keyboards with the orchestra. In November and December 2006, he recorded an album titled A New Day Has Come with his Grand Orchestre in Brussels, Belgium, for Reader's Digest.

Japan being a country in which he has a following, Caravelli is one of the few Western artists who have been invited to conduct the Japanese TV Network's NHK Orchestra, In November 2001, he was touring Japan with an orchestra composed of 32 musicians (tour N° 7 ), invited by the Sony Foundation (the previous tour was in 1996). At this time, Sony Music Japan assembled a 2-CD set Caravelli plays Michel Polnareff and ABBA, being the first (Polnareff) a selection from 1960 and 1970 albums (including his cover of "Love Me, Please Love Me") and the second (ABBA) a selection from 1970's recordings. In December 2003, he toured Japan again; the six concerts were sold out.

He died in Cannet on 1 April 2019, at the age of 88.

== Albums ==
US

- Michelle (1967)
- San Remo Greatest Hits (1967)
- Parisian Strings (1967)
- Portrait for Paris (1967)

Japan

- Francis Lai's Greatest Hits (1971)
- Simon & Garfunkel Greatest Hits (1972)
- Plays Adamo (1973)
- Plays Michel Polnareff (1974)
- Golden Love Sounds (1974)
- Live in Tokyo (1974)
- Beautiful Sunday (1976)
- Live in Japan '76 (1976)
- Plays Janis Ian (1976)
- Caravelli Fashionable Menu 32 (1977) 2 LP set
- Plays Abba (1980)
- La Lecon a Deux(1981)
- Plays Seiko (1983)
- Sur une Balancoire (1983)
- Plays Julio Iglesias (1985)
- Rainbow (1985)
- Concert Caravelli (1986)
- Douce France (1986)
- Midnight Blue (1987)
- Best Screen Themes (1987)
- Tango Album (1987)
- Only You (1987)
- Tenderly (1988)
- Soiree Classique (1989)
- Blue Rondo (1989)
- Best of Screen & Musical Themes (1996)
- Caravelli's Valentine Songs (1998)
- Rare Collection (1999) 2 CD set
- Concert Memorial '99 (1999)
- Christmas Carols (1999)
- In Moscow(1999) Melodiya

- Dites le avec ... Caravelli/Carnet de bal (2014)
- C'est joli la mer ... (2014)
