= Robin Blanchflower =

- Occupations: Music industry executive, record producer
- Years active: 1970s–?

Robin Blanchflower was a music executive, record producer and arranger. He played a major part in Carl Douglas' song "Kung Fu Fighting" becoming a hit.

== Background ==
Blanchflower for a period of time was the UK A&R director for CBS Records. He was also the managing director for the UK operation of Ariola Records. At some stage he was marketing manager of A&M Records, a position he held for four-and-a-half years. he became Pye's A&R manager for two years. While in that position, he signed artists such as Prelude, Carl Douglas, Jimmy Jones and The Brotherhood of Man. He is credited with discovering musician Johnny Wakelin.

== Career ==
=== 1970s ===
Blanchfield was sales manager for A&M Records. He was part of the London team that included Michael De May (promotion), Derek Green (publishing head) and Terry O'Neil (publishing) who were to attend the A&M Regionals on 9-12 October in Chicago.

Michelle Fisher was a singer and former beauty queen from Poole, Dorset who was in a group called Wild Country. She worked with Martin Shaer who produced her debut single, "Who Can Tell" which was released on Pye in 1974. Working with Michelle Fisher, Blanchfield produced her next single "When You Walk in the Room" bw "Love Is a Sweet Thing" which was released on the Pye label in May 1974.

Working with The Casuals, Blanchflower produced their single "The Witch" bw "Good Times" which was released on Dawn Records in 1974.

After Carl Douglas and Biddu had recorded "I Want to Give You My Everything" and "Kung Fu Fighting", the songs were taken to producer Blanchflower. Biddy had intended "I Want to Give You My Everything" to be the A side and "Kung Fu Fighting" to be the B side. It was on Blanchflower's insistence that "Kung Fu Fighting" was to be the A side. After some slow sales which upset Biddy, the song began making a move in the dance clubs. It debuted at No. 42 in August 1974. It September, it got to No. 1.

He produced "Take Away the Sunshine" for Tom Waite. The song was released on Pye in August 1974.

Blanchflower produced the song "Black Superman (Muhammad Ali) for Johnny Wakelin. The song reached No. 7 in the UK and No. 21 in the US.

Working again with Michelle Fisher, Blanchflower produced her singles "Patched Up Broken Heart", released in 1975 and a Van McCoy, Joe Cobb composition, "Soothe Me with Your Love", also released in 1975.

Blanchflower produced Tammy Jones' song "Let Me Try Again" which was released in 1975 on the Epic label. The song got to No. 5 in the UK.

It was reported in the 30 July 1977 issue of Billboard that Blanchflower who had been artist manager for CBS UK and then for the last ten months A&R director had left his position with the company. He had now secured the position of managing director at Ariola Eurodisc U.K. He was quoted as saying that the German-owned Arolia company was expanding fast internationally and they already had offices in the U.S., Austria, France, the Benelux, Brazil and Mexico. It was an obvious step to set up an independent operation in the UK and it was hoped that the UK operation would be fully functional by September. English magazine Music Week reported the same thing in their 21 January 1978 issue that Blanchflower was leading an operation to set up an independent operation in the UK for the West German record label Ariola. By September 1978, at ten months into the operation with Blanchflower in the position of managing director, Ariola UK had achieved sales in excess of 750,000 singles and albums.

Working with producers Del Newman and Georges Garvarentz, Blanchflower co-produced the single "Golden Lady" for The Three Degrees. The song peaked at No. 56 in the UK.

=== 1980s ===
In 1979, the German Benelsmann company had taken over Arista. It was reported in the 1 March 1980 issue of Music Week that it had gotten around to announcing its plans for the future of UK Ariola and Arista operations. Robin Blanchflower was to remain at Ariola as managing director. Charles Levison was to stay at Ariola and was in the position of managing director. Andrew Pryor had been appointed to the position of managing director of the marketing division. The three of them who were pictured on the font cover of the magazine, were on the board of the New Benelsmann Record Company (NRBC). The article also stated that Blanchflower and Levison had the responsibility of handling UK talent acquisition and the exploitation of their recordings in foreign areas. Accordioning to the Dooley column elsewhere in the magazine; "Andrew Pryor well deserves his elevation, but the virtual demotions of Charles Levison and Robin Blanchflower to production company heads hardly does credit to their wider-ranging abilities".

==== Kaleidoscope Records Limited ====
It was reported in the 15 September 1980 issue of Record Business that Blanchflower had resigned from his position at Ariola Records UK to launch his Kaleidoscope Records label in a joint venture with the CBS Records organization.

It appears that the first single released was "Dancin' Me to Ecstasy" by Hot Cuisine. Debuting at No. 77 on the Record Mirror UK Disco chart for the week of 31 January 1981, it peaked at No. 53 for the week of 28 February.

Roy Carter produced the Neville Nash single "Wind Me Up". It was released on Kaleidoscope Records Limited in 1982. It bubbled under the South African Singles chart from the week of 26 March to 16 April 1982.
