= Busta Rhymes production discography =

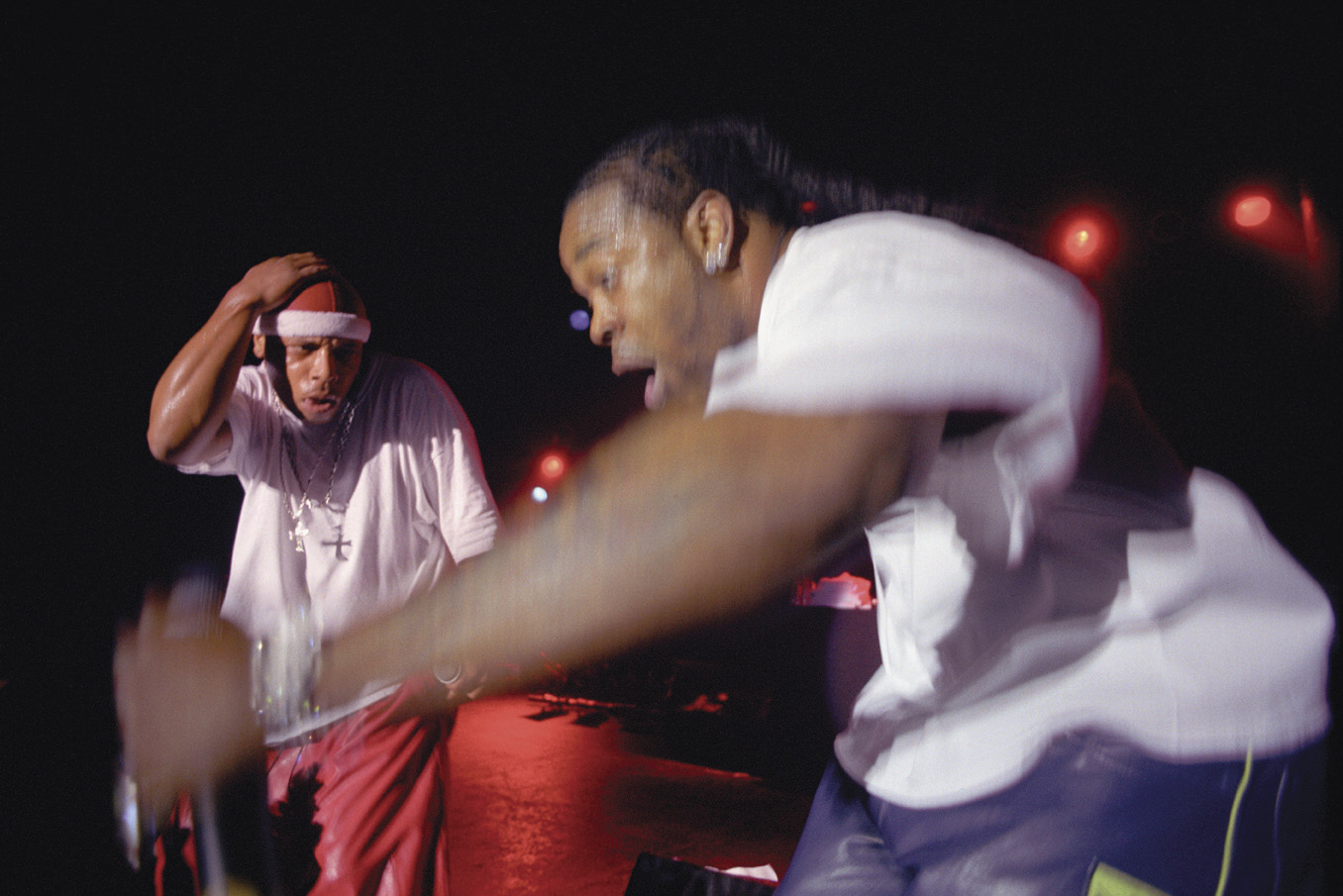
Busta Rhymes in 2002

The following is a production discography of American rapper and record producer Busta Rhymes. It includes a list of songs produced, co-produced and remixed by year, title, artist and album.

== Production credits ==
List of songs produced and/or co-produced, with other performing artists, showing year released and album name
Year	Song	Artist	Album	Notes
1991	"Sound of the Zeekers @#^**?!"	Leaders of the New School	A Future Without a Past...	N/A
1991	"Teachers, Don't Teach Us Nonsense!!"	Leaders of the New School	A Future Without a Past...	produced w/ Leaders of the New School
1991	"Monday We'll Be Together"	Leaders of the New School	Strictly Business (Original Motion Picture Soundtrack)	produced w/ Leaders of the New School
1991	"The Beauty Shop"	Nikki D	Daddy’s Little Girl	produced w/ Leaders of the New School
1991	"Shining Star"	Nikki D	Daddy’s Little Girl	produced w/ Leaders of the New School
1993	"Bass Is Loaded"	Leaders of the New School	T.I.M.E. (The Inner Mind's Eye)	N/A
1993	"Noisy Medication"	Leaders of the New School	T.I.M.E. (The Inner Mind's Eye)	N/A
1993	"The Difference"	Leaders of the New School	T.I.M.E. (The Inner Mind's Eye)	N/A
1993	"Keep Steppin' On"	Another Bad Creation	It Ain't What U Wear, It's How U Play It	N/A
1993	"Strive to Be"	Another Bad Creation	It Ain't What U Wear, It's How U Play It	N/A
1993	"Wicked Act"	Buju Banton, Busta Rhymes	Voice of Jamaica	N/A
1993	"Can't Get Any Harder" (C&C Remix)	James Brown	Universal James	produced w/ Leaders of the New School
1994	"Straight Loonie"	Keith Murray	The Most Beautifullest Thing in This World	produced w/ Erick Sermon & KP
1994	"Looking at the World"	Rampage	Red Oktoba	N/A
1994	"Do You Want It"	Rampage, Busta Rhymes	Red Oktoba	N/A
1994	"Come wit It"	Rampage	Red Oktoba	N/A
1996	"Abandon Ship"	Busta Rhymes, Rampage	The Coming	N/A
1996	"Woo Hah!! Got You All in Check"	Busta Rhymes	The Coming	produced w/ Rashad Smith
1997	"Wild Hot"	Busta Rhymes, A Tribe Called Quest	Rhyme & Reason (Original Motion Picture Soundtrack)	produced w/ The Ummah
1997	"Rampage Outro"	Rampage, Busta Rhymes, Spliff Star, DJ Scratch	Scout's Honor… by Way of Blood	produced w/ DJ Scratch
1997	"Intro"	Busta Rhymes, Dolemite	When Disaster Strikes...	produced w/ DJ Scratch
1997	"Turn It Up (Remix)/Fire It Up"	Busta Rhymes	When Disaster Strikes... and Music from the Motion Picture Can't Hardly Wait	co-produced w/ Spliff Star
1997	"Turn It Up"	Busta Rhymes	When Disaster Strikes...	N/A
1997	"There's Not a Problem My Squad Can't Fix"	Busta Rhymes, Jamal	When Disaster Strikes...	N/A
1998	"The Imperial Intro"	Flipmode Squad	The Imperial	N/A
1998	"Last Night"	Flipmode Squad	The Imperial	N/A
1998	"Freestyle"	Flipmode Squad	The Mix Tape, Volume III: 60 Minutes of Funk (The Final Chapter)	N/A
1998	"On Your Marks, Get Set, Ready, Go!"	Busta Rhymes	The Rugrats Movie: Music from the Motion Picture	N/A
1998	"This Means War!!"	Busta Rhymes, Ozzy Osbourne	Extinction Level Event: The Final World Front	N/A
2000	"Harriet Thugman"	Rah Digga	Dirty Harriet	N/A
2000	"Curtains"	Rah Digga	Dirty Harriet	N/A
2000	"Fire"	Busta Rhymes	Anarchy	N/A
2000	"Ready for War"	Busta Rhymes, M.O.P.	Anarchy	N/A
2006	"Been Through the Storm"	Busta Rhymes	The Big Bang	co-producer w/ Dr. Dre; prod. by Sha Money XL & Black Jeruz
2013	"Pardon My Ways"	Busta Rhymes, Q-Tip	The Abstract and the Dragon	N/A
2013	"Thank You"	Busta Rhymes, Q-Tip, Kanye West, Lil' Wayne	The Abstract and the Dragon	N/A
2020	"E.L.E. 2 Intro"	Busta Rhymes, Chris Rock, Rakim, Pete Rock	Extinction Level Event 2: The Wrath of God	produced w/ Nottz
2020	"Outta My Mind"	Busta Rhymes	Extinction Level Event 2: The Wrath of God	produced w/ Dready
2020	"E.L.E. 2 The Wrath of God"	Busta Rhymes	Extinction Level Event 2: The Wrath of God	produced w/ Nottz
2020	"Deep Thought"	Busta Rhymes	Extinction Level Event 2: The Wrath of God	N/A
2020	"You Will Never Find Another Me"	Busta Rhymes, Mary J. Blige	Extinction Level Event 2: The Wrath of God	N/A

== Remixes ==
List of songs remixed, with other performing artists, showing year released and album name
Year	Song	Artist	Album	Notes
1994	"Beware of the Rampsack" (Smak-U-Bak Rampsack Mix)	Rampage	N/A	remixed and add. prod. w/ Alge Rashad
2007	"Oh My God" (The Super Busdown Remix)	Mark Ronson, Lily Allen, Busta Rhymes	N/A	N/A
2007	"I Got It from My Mama" (Busta Rhymes Remix)	will.i.am	N/A	N/A
2010	"C'mon (Catch 'Em By Surprise)"	Tiësto, Diplo, Busta Rhymes	N/A	prod. w/ Tiësto & Diplo
