= Total Devastation: The Best of Busta Rhymes =

2001 album by Busta Rhymes

Greatest hits album by Busta Rhymes
- Released: October 2, 2001
- Recorded: 1991–2000
- Genre: Hip hop
- Label: Flipmode Records/Elektra Records/Rhino Records
- Producer: Busta Rhymes, Nottz, Swizz Beatz, Rashad Smith, DJ Scratch, Easy Mo Bee, Darrell "

Busta Rhymes chronology
Anarchy (2000)	Total Devastation: The Best of Busta Rhymes (2001)	Genesis (2001)

Total Devastation: The Best of Busta Rhymes is a greatest hits album by American hip-hop artist Busta Rhymes. It received a score of five out of five from Allmusic. It includes songs from his four platinum albums, "Turn It Up (Remix)/Fire It Up" and two songs from the 1991 LP A Future Without a Past recorded with his hip-hop group Leaders of the New School. The compilation in this form is a US exclusive; in the rest of the world (namely Europe, Germany and Australia), it was released in altered form by Warner Music Group and re-titled Turn It Up! The Very Best of Busta Rhymes.

Professional ratings
Review scores
Source	Rating
Allmusic	5/5 stars
Blender	3/5 stars
Robert Christgau	(3-star Honorable Mention)
The Rolling Stone Album Guide	4/5 stars

== Track listings ==
=== Total Devastation ===
No.	Title	Length
1.	"Case of the P.T.A." (With Leaders of the New School)
2.	"Sobb Story" (With Leaders of the New School)
3.	"Woo Hah!! Got You All in Check"
4.	"Everything Remains Raw"
5.	"Do My Thing"
6.	"It's a Party" (Featuring Zhané)
7.	"Put Your Hands Where My Eyes Could See"
8.	"One" (Featuring Erykah Badu)
9.	"Turn It Up (Remix)/Fire It Up"
10.	"Dangerous"
11.	"Rhymes Galore"
12.	"Do the Bus a Bus"
13.	"What's It Gonna Be?!" (Featuring Janet Jackson)
14.	"Gimme Some More"
15.	"Party is Goin' on Over Here"
16.	"Tear da Roof Off"
17.	"Get Out!!"
18.	"Bladow!!"

=== Turn It Up! ===
Turn It Up! The Very Best of Busta Rhymes

Greatest hits album by Busta Rhymes
- Released: April 2, 2002
- Recorded: 1991–2001
- Genre: Hip hop
- Label: Warner Music Group/Rhino Records
- Producer: Busta Rhymes, Nottz, Swizz Beatz, Rashad Smith, DJ Scratch, Easy Mo Bee, Darrell "Delite" Allamby

Busta Rhymes chronology
Genesis (2001)	Turn It Up! The Very Best of Busta Rhymes (2002)	It Ain't Safe No More (2002)

Professional ratings
Review scores
Source	Rating
Allmusic	link

No.	Title	Length
1.	"Turn It Up/Fire It Up" (Remix)
2.	"Woo Hah!! Got You All in Check"
3.	"Gimme Some More"
4.	"What's It Gonna Be?!" (Featuring Janet Jackson)
5.	"Dangerous" (album version; German edition features the Soul Society Remix)
6.	"Put Your Hand Where My Eyes Could See"
7.	"It's a Party" (Featuring Zhane)
8.	"One" (Featuring Erykah Badu)
9.	"Do My Thing"
10.	"Do the Bus a Bus"
11.	"Party Is Goin' On Over Here"
12.	"Get Out!!"
13.	"Sobb Story"
14.	"Tear da Roof Off"
15.	"Everything Remains Raw"
16.	"Rhymes Galore"
17.	"Turn It Up" (Soul Society Remix Extended)

German edition bonus tracks
No.	Title	Length
18.	"There's Not a Problem My Squad Can't Fix" (C.L.A.S. Remix)
19.	"Do the Bus a Bus" (Diamond Dee Remix)
20.	"What's It Gonna Be?!" (Junk Food Remix)
