= The International Zone Coaster =

Single by Leaders of the New School

from the album A Future Without a Past...
- Released: 1992
- Recorded: 1991
- Genre: Hip hop
- Length: 5:05
- Label: Elektra
- Songwriter(s): John Dajani, John Gamble, Bryan Higgins, James Jackson, Dante Ross, Busta Rhymes

Leaders of the New School singles chronology
"Sobb Story" (1991)	"The International Zone Coaster" (1992)	"What's Next" (1993)

Music video
- "The International Zone Coaster" on YouTube

"The International Zone Coaster" is the third single from Leaders of the New School debut album, A Future Without a Past.... The song peaked at number one on the U.S. Hot Rap Singles chart in 1991.
