= Sob Story =

Sob Story may refer to:

In music:

- Sob Story, a 1994 album by Gaunt (band)
- Sob Story, a 2013 album by Spectrals, produced by Chet "JR" White
- "Sob Story", a 1985 song by The Bolshoi
- "Sob Story", a 2018 song by Clarence Clarity
- "Sob Story", a 1983 song by Minor Threat

In other uses:

- Sob Story, a 2007 novel by Carol Anne Davis

== See also ==
- Appeal to pity
- "Sobb Story", a 1991 song by Leaders of the New School
