= Raw (Alyson Williams album) =

1989 studio album by Alyson Williams

Studio album by Alyson Williams
- Released: 1989
- Label: Def Jam
- Producers: Alvin Moody; Russell Simmons; Vincent Bell

Alyson Williams chronology
Raw (1989)	Alyson Williams (1992)

Raw is the debut album by American singer Alyson Williams, released in 1989 on the Def Jam Recordings record label. It contains the singles "Sleep Talk" (UK No. 17) "My Love Is So Raw" (UK No. 34) and "I Need Your Lovin'" (UK No. 8).

== Critical reception ==
Professional ratings
Review scores
Source	Rating
AllMusic	4/5 stars

In a retrospective review for AllMusic, Craig Lytle said that "[Williams] comes up with one outstanding effort after another as she covers the spectrum of R&B, jazz, dance, and rap."

== Track listing ==
No.	Title	Writer(s)	Length
1.	"Just Call My Name"	Denzil Miller; Ken Curry; Phillip Ingram	6:05
2.	"We're Gonna Make It" (featuring Ted Mills)	Alvin Moody; Ted Mills; Vincent Bell	3:42
3.	"I Looked Into Your Eyes"	Frederick Gordon	5:28
4.	"Not On the Outside"	Larry Roberts; Sylvia Robinson	4:35
5.	"Masquerade"	Abdul Kalig	4:51
6.	"I'm So Glad" (featuring Chuck Stanley)	Gordon	4:39
7.	"My Love Is So Raw" (featuring Nikki D)	Moody; Nichelle Strong; Bell	5:08
8.	"On the Rocks"	Maurice Wingate	3:49
9.	"Still My No. 1"	Moody; Tony Adderly	4:44
10.	"I Need Your Lovin'"	Gordon; Bell	4:58
11.	"Sleep Talk"	Moody; Russell Simmons; Bell	5:27
12.	"Make You Mine Tonight" (featuring Chuck Stanley)	Clarence Hayes; Bell	4:47
13.	"How to Love Again" (featuring Oran "Juice" Jones)	Gordon; Bell	4:40

Note

- Tracks 12 and 13 feature on the CD version only.

== Personnel ==
Adapted from AllMusic.

- Tony Adderly – drum programming
- Toyce Anderson – stylist
- Chandra Armstead – background vocals
- James Austin – bass, drums
- Vincent Bell – drum programming, percussion, producer, vocal arrangement
- Joe Blaney – engineer, mixing
- Blue Magic – guest artist, background vocals
- Steve Breck – keyboards
- Jocelyn Brown – guest artist, background vocals
- Priscilla Burrel – background vocals
- Mike Campbell – guitar
- John Cooksey – drums
- Bruce Davidson – photography
- Dennis Davis – drums
- Max Ehrmann – liner notes
- Lisa Fischer – guest artist, background vocals
- Mike Ford – bass
- Michael Gabriel – drums, keyboards
- Fredrick Gordon – keyboards, piano, strings, vocal arrangement
- Omar Hakim – drums, guest artist
- Connie Harvey – background vocals
- Vincent Henry – saxophone
- Rod Hui – engineer
- Phillip Ingram – background vocals
- Fran Jay – background vocals
- Barry Sonjohn Johnson – bass
- Oran "Juice" Jones – guest artist, primary artist
- Abdul Kalig – producer, programming
- Frederick Lewis – photography
- Peter Lord – keyboards
- Tommy McConnell – drum programming, engineer
- Denzil Miller – guitar, keyboards, producer, programming
- Ted Mills – primary artist, producer
- Alvin Moody – bass, engineer, producer, vocal arrangement
- Wendell Morrison – background vocals
- Najee – guest artist, saxophone
- Nikki D – featured artist, primary artist
- Paul Pesco – guest artist, guitar
- Marc Raboy – make-up, photography
- Eric "Vietnam" Sadler – producer
- Bill Saxon – saxophone
- Tony Sellari – art direction
- Christopher Shaw – assistant engineer
- Hank Shocklee – producer
- Russell Simmons – drum programming, producer, vocal arrangement
- Chuck Stanley – primary artist, background vocals
- Ty Stephens – background vocals
- Bill Stephney – producer
- Annette Taylor – background vocals
- Lee Truesdale – background vocals
- Elai Tubo – drum programming, remastering
- Alyson Williams – liner notes, performer, primary artist, vocal arrangement, background vocals
- Maurice Wingate – keyboards, producer, alto sax, vocal arrangement
- Abdul Zurhi – guitar

== Charts ==
=== Weekly charts ===
Chart (1989–1990)	Peak position
UK Albums (Official Charts)	29
US Top R&B/Hip-Hop Albums (Billboard)	25

=== Year-end charts ===
Chart (1989)	Position
US Top R&B/Hip-Hop Albums (Billboard)	80
Chart (1990)	Position
US Top R&B/Hip-Hop Albums (Billboard)	52

== Certifications ==
Region	Certification	Certified units/sales
United Kingdom (BPI)	Gold	100,000^{^}
^{^} Shipments figures based on certification alone.
