= Calm Down (Busta Rhymes song) =

Single by Busta Rhymes featuring Eminem

from the album Extinction Level Event 2: The Wrath of God (Reloaded)
- Released: July 1, 2014
- Recorded: 2012–2013
- Genre: Hip hop; Hardcore Hip Hop
- Length: 5:55
- Label: The Conglomerate; Empire
- Songwriters: Trevor Smith; Marshall Mathers; Elijah Molina; Christopher Wallace; Earl Nelson; Bobby Relf; Lawrence Muggerud; Eric Schrody
- Producers: Scoop DeVille; Eminem (add.)

Busta Rhymes singles chronology
"Thank You" (2013)	"Calm Down" (2014)	"Devil" (2015)

Eminem singles chronology
"Headlights" (2014)	"Calm Down" (2014)	"Guts Over Fear" (2014)

"Calm Down" is a song by American rapper Busta Rhymes from the album Extinction Level Event 2: The Wrath of God. The song features Eminem and was produced by Scoop DeVille. It was released for digital download on July 1, 2014, by The Conglomerate Entertainment and Empire Distribution.

== Background ==
In September 2013, Busta Rhymes confirmed the collaboration in an interview with XXL, saying: "I’ve got a six-minute record with Eminem that sounds like we are respectfully trying to battle each other in a way that you probably never heard us battle in our entire careers on a record. So it's lot of real incredibly golden moments for us on this project." In January 2014, the song's producer Scoop DeVille spoke about the song in an interview with Vlad TV, saying that it would "destroy the streets of New York" and "bring back Busta in a major way."

In July 2014, during an interview with Power 106, Busta explained that as he and Eminem kept going "back and forth" in a competitive, battling manner, the song went from three minutes and eight seconds to 6 minutes. Busta continued: "We [were] like, 'Yo, listen, it's one thing to say F the rules, but it's another thing to say we're O.D.ing," and called the song a "special," "beautiful piece of art."

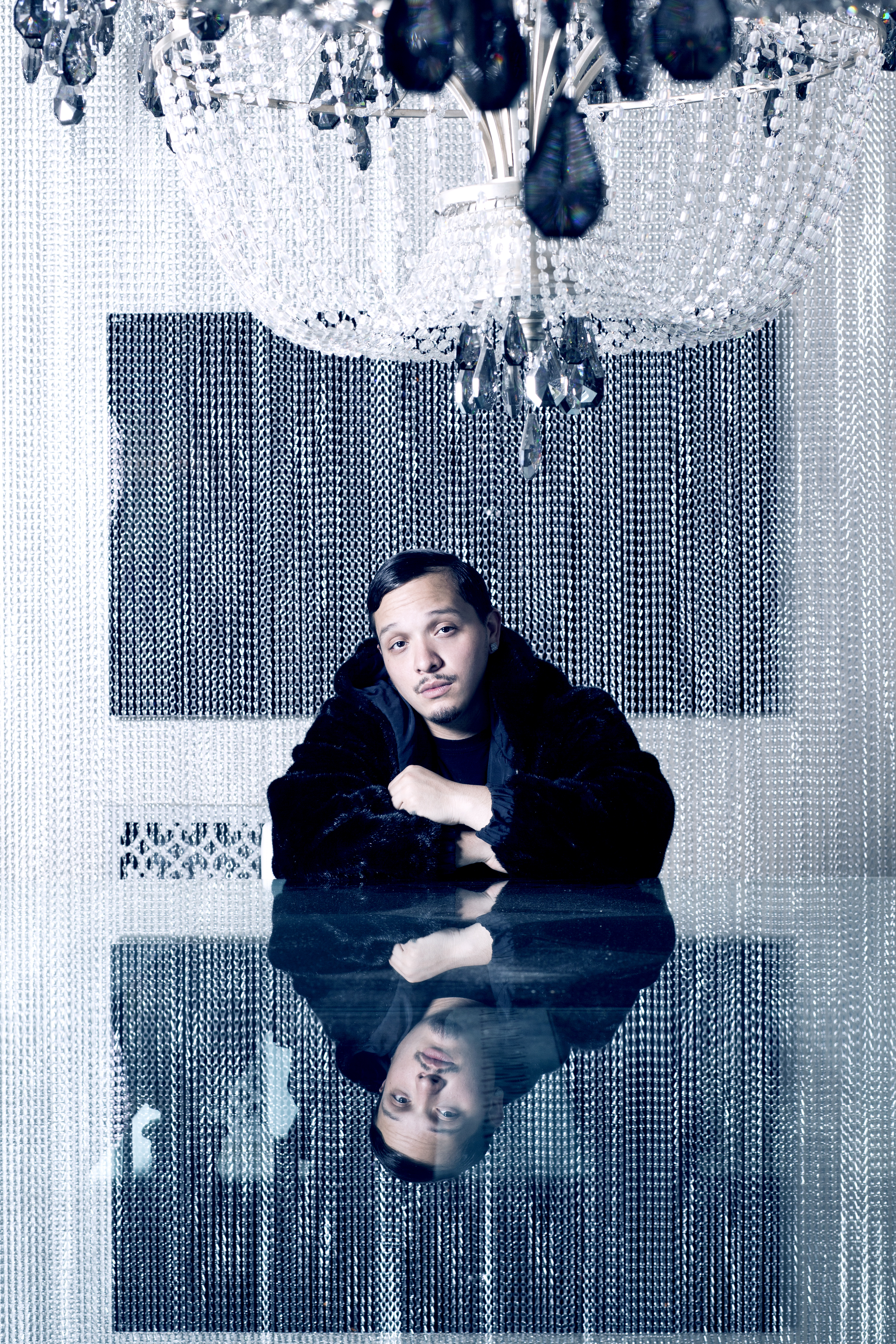
"Calm Down" was produced by Scoop DeVille.

In a July 2014, interview with Complex, Busta explained how the song came together. Scoop provided Busta with the instrumental, which Busta "loved". He immediately recorded two 16-bar verses and titled the song "Calm Down". After "marinating" on the song for some time, Busta felt that it "would be an incredible record for Eminem to get on" and called his own manager Chris Lighty, and requested him to arrange a meeting with Eminem's manager, Paul Rosenberg, to whom they gave the song, but were not informed whether Eminem would record for the song. After six weeks, Busta's associate Shaheem Reid reached out to then-Shady Records A&R Riggs Morales, who came by the studio to hear the song, and two weeks later, Rosenberg finally confirmed that "[Em] had got the beat and that he's fucking with it."

After a few months, Busta met up with Rosenberg in the studio, where Busta heard Eminem's verse and "was blown away," but was also intrigued that Eminem had a longer, 42-bar verse, which triggered "a competitive process." Busta then wrote a 50 bar verse and flew out to Eminem's studio in Detroit for a mix session, where Eminem heard Busta's new verse, which prompted him to expand his own verse to 60 bars. Busta then expanded his verse to 62 bars, and finally Eminem his own to 64 bars. Busta also spoke about how long it took to finish the song, saying: "It took us about seven months to go back and forth because we still had other commitments and tours to go on. So sometimes I would have to wait a couple of months to get Em's new adjustment back and vice versa."

Busta noted that "It started off from just doing a dope, high energy hip-hop record into us respectfully competing and damn near battling each other" and stated that he and Eminem "bring the best out of" each other and praised Eminem as someone who "genuinely still cares about the music."

== Composition and production ==
"Calm Down" is a hip hop song. It features two lengthy verses by each rapper, both preceded by a chorus. The instrumental is produced by Scoop DeVille and is based around a sample of the introductory horns from the 1992 House of Pain song "Jump Around" (which themselves are taken from Bob & Earl's 1963 track "Harlem Shuffle"). The song also includes vocal samples: "Yo, chill man! Chill!" from The Notorious B.I.G.'s 1993 track "Party and Bullshit" (which appears in the background of the second chorus and at the very end of the song), "Steady on the right, steady on the left" from Grand Wizzard Theodore and Kevie Kev Rockwell's 1983 "Military Cut - Scratch Mix" (used for the chorus).

In interview with Power 106 on Big Boy's Neighborhood, Busta revealed that the song's mixing and mastering, as well as some additional production, was done by Eminem.

== Commercial performance ==
In its debut week of release, the song sold 40,133 digital copies in the United States and debuted at number 94 on the Billboard Hot 100.

== Track listing ==
Digital download
No.	Title	Writer(s)	Producer(s)	Length
1.	"Calm Down" (featuring Eminem)	Trevor Smith; Marshall Mathers; Elijah Molina; Earl Nelson; Bobby Relf	Scoop DeVille; Eminem^{[a]}	5:55

Calm Down: The Clash EP
No.	Title	Writer(s)	Producer(s)	Length
1.	"Calm Down" (featuring Eminem) (explicit)	Trevor Smith; Marshall Mathers; Elijah Molina; Earl Nelson; Bobby Relf	Scoop DeVille; Eminem^{[a]}	5:55
2.	"Calm Down 2.0" (explicit)	Smith; Molina; Nelson; Relf	Scoop DeVille; Eminem^{[a]}	2:39
3.	"Calm Down 3.0" (featuring Everlast) (explicit)	Smith; Erik Schrody; Molina; Nelson; Relf	Scoop DeVille; Eminem^{[a]}	2:40
4.	"Calm Down" (featuring Eminem) (clean)	Smith; Mathers; Molina; Nelson; Relf	Scoop DeVille; Eminem^{[a]}	5:57
5.	"Calm Down 2.0" (clean)	Smith; Molina; Nelson; Relf	Scoop DeVille; Eminem^{[a]}	2:39
6.	"Calm Down 3.0" (featuring Everlast) (clean)	Smith; Schrody; Molina; Nelson; Relf	Scoop DeVille; Eminem^{[a]}	2:40
7.	"Calm Down" (instrumental)	Smith; Molina; Nelson; Relf	Scoop DeVille; Eminem^{[a]}	5:55
Total length:				28:25

Notes

- ^{^[a]} signifies an additional producer.

== Chart performance ==
Chart (2014)	Peak position
Belgium Urban (Ultratop Flanders)	37
Canada Hot 100 (Billboard)	65
France (SNEP)	183
Germany (Deutsche Black Charts)	2
UK Singles (Official Charts)	63
US Billboard Hot 100	94
US Hot R&B/Hip-Hop Songs (Billboard)	29
