= Daddy's Little Girl (album) =

Studio album by Nikki D
- Released: September 3, 1991
- Recorded: 1990–1991
- Studios: Power Play Studios; Chung King Studios; Greene St. Recording Studios; Libra Digital Sound; Marathon Studios; Island Media Studios
- Genre: Hip hop
- Length: 49:25
- Label: Def Jam/Columbia
- Producers: Russell Simmons (exec.); S.I.D. Reynolds; Leaders of the New School; The Epitome Of Scratch; Eric "Vietnam" Sadler; Large Professor; Smooth Ice; Prince Paul; Sam Sever

Singles from Daddy's Little Girl
- 1. "Lettin' off Steam" Released: August 2, 1990; 2. "Daddy's Little Girl" Released: February 13, 1991; 3. "Hang on Kid" Released: June 20, 1991; 4. "Wasted" Released: October 17, 1991

Professional ratings
Review scores
Source	Rating
AllMusic	2/5 stars
Entertainment Weekly	B+

Daddy's Little Girl is the only studio album by American rapper Nikki D. It was released on September 3, 1991, through Def Jam Recordings. Recording sessions took place at Power Play Studios, Chung King Studios, Greene St. Recording, Libra Digital Sound, Marathon Studios and Island Media Studios in New York. Production was handled by S.I.D. Reynolds, Leaders of the New School, The Epitome of Scratch, Eric "Vietnam" Sadler, Large Professor, Smooth Ice, Prince Paul and Sam Sever. The album reached number 54 on the US Billboard Top R&B/Hip-Hop Albums; while its eponymous lead single reached No. 10 on the Hot Dance Singles Sales and No. 1 on the Hot Rap Singles.

The album is notable for being Def Jam's first rap album released by a female.

== Track listing ==
No.	Title	Writer(s)	Producer(s)	Length
1.	"Daddy's Little Girl"	Nichelle Strong; Sidney Reynolds	S.I.D. Reynolds	4:28
2.	"Monday We'll Be Together"	Strong; Bryan Higgins; James Jackson; Sheldon Scott; Trevor Smith; Curtis Mayfield; James Woodie Alexander II; Wanda Hutchinson	Leaders of the New School	3:52
3.	"Hang On Kid"	Strong; Reynolds	S.I.D. Reynolds	3:02
4.	"The Beauty Shop"	Strong; Higgins; Jackson; Scott; Smith; Allen A. Jones; Harvey Henderson; James Edward Alexander; Ron L. Gorden; Roy Cunningham; Willie Clarence Hall	Leaders of the New School	4:06
5.	"All About You"	Strong; Robert Taylor	The Epitome Of Scratch	3:45
6.	"Sunny Daze"	Strong; Higgins; Jackson; Scott; Smith; Al Green; Fred Mitchell Jordan III; Reuben Fairfax, Jr.	Leaders of the New School	3:32
7.	"Wasted Pussy"	Strong; Eric Sadler	Eric "Vietnam" Sadler; The Epitome Of Scratch (co.)	3:41
8.	"Your Man is My Man"	Strong; Arthur Robinson; William Paul Mitchell	Large Professor	4:01
9.	"18 and Loves To Go"	Strong; Reynolds	S.I.D. Reynolds	3:22
10.	"Another Man is Beatin' My Time"	Strong; Reynolds; Norman Henry Ingram Jr.	S.I.D. Reynolds	4:26
11.	"Gotta Up the Ante For the Panties"	Strong; Robinson; Camille Gainer	Smooth Ice; Camille Gainer (co.)	3:49
12.	"Freak Accident"	Strong; Paul Huston	Prince Paul	2:11
13.	"Lettin' Off Steam" (Club Mix)	Strong; Sam Citrin	Sam Sever	5:10
Total length:				49:25

== Personnel ==
- Nichelle "Nikki D" Strong – vocals
- Sidney "S.I.D." Reynolds – producer (tracks: 1, 3, 9, 10), mixing (tracks: 3, 9, 10)
- Bryan "Charlie Brown" Higgins – producer (tracks: 2, 4, 6)
- James "Dinco D" Jackson – producer (tracks: 2, 4, 6)
- Sheldon "Cut Monitor Milo" Scott – producer (tracks: 2, 4, 6)
- Trevor "Busta Rhymes" Smith – producer (tracks: 2, 4, 6)
- Robert "Epitome" Taylor – producer (track 5), co-producer (track 7)
- Eric "Vietnam" Sadler – producer (track 7)
- Arthur "Smooth Ice" Robinson – producer (tracks: 8, 11)
- "Prince Paul" Huston – producer (track 12)
- Sam "Sever" Citrin – producer (track 13)
- Camille Gainer – co-producer (track 11)
- Russell Simmons – executive producer
- Anton Pukshansky – recording (tracks: 1, 3)
- Steve Greenwell – recording & mixing (tracks: 2, 4, 6)
- Josh Chervokas – mixing (track 1)
- Kevin Reynolds – mixing (tracks: 3, 9, 10)
- Charles Dos Santos – recording & mixing (track 5)
- Chris Shaw – recording & mixing (tracks: 5, 7)
- Michael Mangini – recording & mixing (track 6)
- Paul "Large Professor" Mitchell – post-production & re-mixing (track 8)
- Chris Champion – re-mixing (track 8)
- Tony Aliprantis – recording (tracks: 9, 10)
- Tony Papamichael – recording (tracks: 9, 10)
- Christopher Savino – recording (track 11)
- Ted Sabety – mixing (track 11)
- Mike Teelucksingh – recording & mixing (track 12)
- Joe Grant – photography
- Faith Newman (music executive) – A&R

== Charts ==
Chart (1991)	Peak position
US Top R&B/Hip-Hop Albums (Billboard)	54
