= Year of the Dragon (Busta Rhymes album) =

Studio album by Busta Rhymes
- Released: August 21, 2012
- Recorded: 2010–12
- Genre: East Coast hip hop
- Length: 50:11
- Labels: The Conglomerate; YMCMB; Cash Money; Violator; Universal Republic; Google Play
- Producers: Busta Rhymes (exec.); Bink!; Boi-1da; Dready; Focus; Jahlil Beats; K. Figz; Matthew Burnett; Mr. Porter; Pop & Oak; Ted Smooth; Ty Fyffe; Young Yonny

Busta Rhymes chronology
Back on My B.S. (2009)	Year of the Dragon (2012)	Extinction Level Event 2: The Wrath of God (2020)

Singles from Year of the Dragon
- 1. "King Tut" Released: May 22, 2012; 2. "Doin' It Again" Released: August 1, 2012

Year of the Dragon is the ninth studio album by American hip hop recording artist Busta Rhymes, it was released by Google Play as a free release on August 21, 2012. The album features guest appearances from Anthony Hamilton, Cam'ron, Robin Thicke, Maino, Vybz Kartel, J-Doe, Reek da Villian, Rick Ross, Gucci Mane, Trey Songz and Lil Wayne.

== Background ==
The album's title (inspired by the Chinese zodiac) and cover art were revealed on July 9, 2012. The official track list was released on August 8, 2012. It was released on August 21, 2012, for free download via Google Play. As of February 6, 2026, the album is not available anywhere

== Singles ==
The album's lead single "King Tut", featuring Reek da Villian and J-Doe, was released on May 22, 2012. The music video for "King Tut", featuring Reek da Villian and J-Doe, was released on July 25, 2012. The album's second single "Doin' It Again" featuring Reek da Villian and Chanel Nicole was released on August 1, 2012. The music video for "Doin' It Again" featuring Reek da Villian and Chanel Nicole was released on September 12, 2012. The music video for "Movie" featuring J-Doe was released on October 16, 2012.

== Critical response ==
Professional ratings
Review scores
Source	Rating
Entertainment Weekly	B+
HipHopDX	3/5
RapReviews	7.5/10

Year of the Dragon was met with generally mixed reviews from music critics. Slava Kuperstein of HipHopDX gave the album three out of five stars, saying "The problem is the same one that’s plagued just about every single Busta Rhymes album: the Dungeon Dragon cannot decide on a direction for the project. It’s not cohesive in production, styles, or subject matter. Busta’s all over the place, and does nothing to improve his reputation as one of the greatest emcees to not have a great album to his name. Here's to hoping the real album will be better."

== Track listing ==
No.	Title	Writer(s)	Producer(s)	Length
1.	"I'm Talking to You"	Trevor Smith; Tyrone Fyffe; Roland Orzabal; Ian Stanley	Ty Fyffe	3:33
2.	"Til We Die" (featuring Rick Ross and Trey Songz)	T. Smith; Tremaine Neverson; William Roberts; Karl Daniel	Dready	4:27
3.	"Do That Thing"	T. Smith; Bernard Edwards, Jr.	Focus	3:42
4.	"Make It Look Easy" (featuring Gucci Mane)	T. Smith; Radric Davis; Teddy Mendez; Fred Wesley; James Brown	Ted Smooth	3:37
5.	"Pressure" (featuring Lil Wayne)	T. Smith; Dwayne Carter, Jr.; Andrew "Pop" Wansel	Pop & Oak	3:10
6.	"Love-Hate" (featuring Robin Thicke)	T. Smith; Robin Thicke; Denaun Porter; Sammy Lowe; Betty Lowe	Mr. Porter	3:57
7.	"Grind Real Slow"	T. Smith; Roosevelt Harrell III; Eldra DeBarge; William Debarge; Jordan Etterlene	Bink!	3:40
8.	"King Tut" (featuring Reek da Villian and J-Doe)	T. Smith; Tariek Williams; James Smith; Orlando Tucker	Jahlil Beats	4:42
9.	"Sound Boy" (featuring Cam'ron)	T. Smith; Cameron Giles; Matthew Samuels	Boi-1da; Matthew Burnett	3:23
10.	"Doin' It Again" (featuring Reek da Villian and Chanel)	T. Smith; Williams; Chanel Sosa; Mendez; Tony Cottrell; Idrs Mills; Shannon Showes	Ted Smooth	3:28
11.	"Wine & Go Down" (featuring Vybz Kartel)	T. Smith; Adidja Palmer; Daniel	Dready	3:32
12.	"Movie" (featuring J-Doe)	T. Smith; James Smith; Ronald Ferebee, Jr.; Brandon Bell	Young Yonny; Donut	4:12
13.	"Crazy"	T. Smith; Daniel	Dready	3:27
14.	"Bleed the Same Blood" (featuring Maino and Anthony Hamilton)	T. Smith; Jermaine Coleman; Timothy Walls; Shawn Thomas; Willie Draughn, Jr.	K. Figz	3:46

Sample notes

- "I'm Talking to You" contains a sample of "Shout", performed by Tears for Fears.
- "Make It Look Easy" contains a sample of "Blues and Pants", performed by James Brown.
- "Love-Heat" contains a sample of "Baby I Don't Like You", performed by The Moments.
- "Grind Real Slow" contains elements of "I Like It", written by Eldra DeBarge, William DeBarge, and Jordan Etterlene.
- "Doin It Again" contains a sample of "Round and Round", performed by Hi-Tek.
