= List of awards and nominations received by Busta Rhymes =

Among the awards won by the American musician Busta Rhymes are The Source Awards (1999), Soul Train Music Awards (2000), the Smash Hits Poll Winners Party (2005), Myx Music Award (2006), BET Hip Hop Awards (2006 and 2011), and the BET Lifetime Achievement Award (2023). He has been nominated many times for the Grammy Award and the MTV Video Music Award.

== Billboard Awards ==
=== Billboard Music Award ===
Busta Rhymes has been nominated for one Billboard Music Award during his solo career.

Year	Nominated work	Award	Result
2005	"Don't Cha" (with The Pussycat Dolls)	Top-Selling Hot 100 Song of the Year	Nominated

=== Billboard R&B/Hip-Hop Awards ===
Year	Nominee/Work	Award	Result	Ref.
2005	Don't Cha (featuring Busta Rhymes)	Hot R&B/Hip-Hop Songs Sales	Won	

== BET Hip Hop Awards ==
Year	Nominee / work	Award	Result
2006	Himself	Best Live Performance	Won
2006	Himself	Move the Crowd Award	Won
2009	Himself	Best Live Performer	Nominated
2010	"All I Do Is Win (Remix)" (with DJ Khaled, Rick Ross, T-Pain, P. Diddy, Fabolous, Fat Joe, Jadakiss and Nicki Minaj)	Reese’s Perfect Combo Award	Nominated
2010	Himself	Best Live Performer	Nominated
2011	Himself	Best Live Performer	Nominated
2011	"Look at Me Now" (with Chris Brown and Lil Wayne)	Best Hip Hop Video	Won
2011	"Look at Me Now" (with Chris Brown and Lil Wayne)	Reese’s Perfect Combo Award	Won
2011	"Look at Me Now" (with Chris Brown and Lil Wayne)	Sweet 16: Best Featured Verse	Won
2011	"Look at Me Now" (with Chris Brown and Lil Wayne)	Verizon People’s Champ Award	Won

== International Dance Music Awards ==
The Winter Music Conference was established in 1985. It is a part of the Winter Music Conference, a weeklong electronic music event held annually. Busta Rhymes received one award out of one nomination.

Year	Nominee/Work	Award	Result	Ref.
2006	Don't Cha (featuring Busta Rhymes)	Best R&B/Urban Dance Track	Won	

== Soul Train Music Awards ==
Busta Rhymes has won a Soul Train Music Award and has been nominated for two Soul Train Music Awards during his solo career.

Year	Nominated work	Award	Result
2000	"What's It Gonna Be"	The Michael Jackson Award for Best R&B/Soul or Rap Music Video	Won
2006	"Don't Cha" (with The Pussycat Dolls)	Best R&B/Soul Single, Group, Band or Duo	Nominated
2007	"I Love My Chick" (featuring Kelis & will.i.am)	The Michael Jackson for Best R&B/Soul or Rap Music Video	Nominated

== American Music Awards ==
Busta Rhymes has been nominated for one American Music Award during his solo career.

Year	Nominated work	Award	Result
2000	Busta Rhymes	Favorite Soul/R&B Male Artist	Nominated

== The Source Awards ==
Busta Rhymes has won a Source Award during his solo career.

Year	Nominated work	Award	Result
1999	What's It Gonna Be?!" (featuring Janet Jackson)	Music Video of the Year	Won

== Grammy Award ==
Busta Rhymes has been nominated for 12 Grammy Awards during his solo career.

Year	Nominated work	Award	Result
1997	"Woo Hah!! Got You All in Check"	Best Rap Solo Performance	Nominated
1998	"Put Your Hands Where My Eyes Could See"	Best Rap Solo Performance	Nominated
1999	"Dangerous"	Best Rap Solo Performance	Nominated
2000	"Gimme Some More"	Best Rap Solo Performance	Nominated
2000	"What's It Gonna Be?!" (featuring Janet Jackson)	Best Rap Performance By a Duo or Group	Nominated
2000	E.L.E. (Extinction Level Event): The Final World Front	Best Rap Album	Nominated
2001	"Fire"	Best Music Video, Short Form	Nominated
2003	"Pass the Courvoisier Pt. 2" (featuring P. Diddy & Pharrell)	Best Rap Performance By a Duo or Group	Nominated
2007	"Touch It"	Best Rap Solo Performance	Nominated
2009	Tha Carter III	Album of the Year	Nominated
2012	"Look At Me Now" (with Chris Brown & Lil Wayne)	Best Rap Performance	Nominated
2012	"Look At Me Now" (with Chris Brown & Lil Wayne)	Best Rap Song	Nominated

== MTV Video Music Award ==
Busta Rhymes has been nominated for 16 MTV Video Music Awards during his solo career and was the recipient of the Rock the Bells Visionary Award in 2025.

Year	Nominated work	Award	Result
1996	"Woo-Hah! Got You All in Check"	Breakthrough Video	Nominated
1998	"Put Your Hands Where My Eyes Could See"	Best Male Video	Nominated
1998	"Put Your Hands Where My Eyes Could See"	Best Rap Video	Nominated
1998	"Put Your Hands Where My Eyes Could See"	Breakthrough Video	Nominated
1998	"Put Your Hands Where My Eyes Could See"	Best Choreography	Nominated
1999	"What's It Gonna Be?!" (featuring Janet Jackson)	Best Hip-Hop Video	Nominated
1999	"What's It Gonna Be?!" (featuring Janet Jackson)	Best Direction	Nominated
1999	"What's It Gonna Be?!" (featuring Janet Jackson)	Best Special Effects	Nominated
1999	"What's It Gonna Be?!" (featuring Janet Jackson)	Best Art Direction	Nominated
1999	"Gimme Some More"	Breakthrough Video	Nominated
2002	"Pass the Courvoisier Pt. 2" (featuring P.Diddy & Pharrell)	Best Hip-Hop Video	Nominated
2003	"I Know What You Want" (featuring Mariah Carey & Flipmode Squad)	Best Hip-Hop Video	Nominated
2006	"Touch It (remix)" (featuring Mary J. Blige, Rah Digga, Missy Elliott, Lloyd Banks, Papoose & DMX)	Best Male Video	Nominated
2006	"Touch It (remix)" (featuring Mary J. Blige, Rah Digga, Missy Elliott, Lloyd Banks, Papoose & DMX)	Best Rap Video	Nominated
2011	"Look At Me Now" (with Chris Brown & Lil Wayne)	Best Hip-Hop Video	Nominated
2011	"Look At Me Now" (with Chris Brown & Lil Wayne)	Best Collaboration	Nominated
2025	Himself	Rock the Bells Visionary Award	Won

== Myx Music Award ==
The Myx Music Awards is an annual awards ceremony presented by the Philippine music video channel myx. Busta Rhymes received one nomination and won one.

Year	Nominee / work	Award	Result
2006	"Don't Cha" (featuring Busta Rhymes)	Favorite International Music Video	Won

== Smash Hits Poll Winners Party ==
The Smash Hits Poll Winners Party were an awards ceremony which ran from 1988 to 2005. Each award winner was voted by readers of the Smash Hits magazine. Busta Rhymes received one award from one nomination.

Year	Nominee/Work	Award	Result	Ref.
2005	Don't Cha (featuring Busta Rhymes)	Best Video	Won	
