= Case of the P.T.A. =

Single by Leaders of the New School

from the album A Future Without a Past...
- Released: February 13, 1991
- Recorded: 1990
- Genre: Hip hop
- Length: 3:42
- Label: Elektra
- Songwriters: Bryan Higgins (Charlie Brown), James Jackson (Dinco D), Sheldon Scott (Cut Monitor Milo), Trevor Smith

Leaders of the New School singles chronology
"Case of the P.T.A." (1991)	"Sobb Story" (1991)

Music video
- "Case of the P.T.A." on YouTube

"Case of the P.T.A." is the first single by Leaders of the New School from their debut album A Future Without a Past.... It peaked at number four on the Billboard Hot Rap Singles charts. The song contains a sample from Ramsey Lewis, The Mighty Quinn.

== Music video ==
In the video, it starts an introduction about somewhere in "Strong Island", where Busta Rhymes, Charlie Brown, and Dinco D are in high school. Dinco drops his first verse about discussing his best and worst times on how he got in trouble with himself. Then, in the second verse, Busta drops his line about his behavior that he had so much troubles while in class. And in the final verse where Charlie Brown talks about himself being suspended from school and went to court to see the judge. As for people in the hallways running around and people dancing in the lunchroom, the video ends with the group leaving the cafeteria.
