= Alyson Williams =

American singer

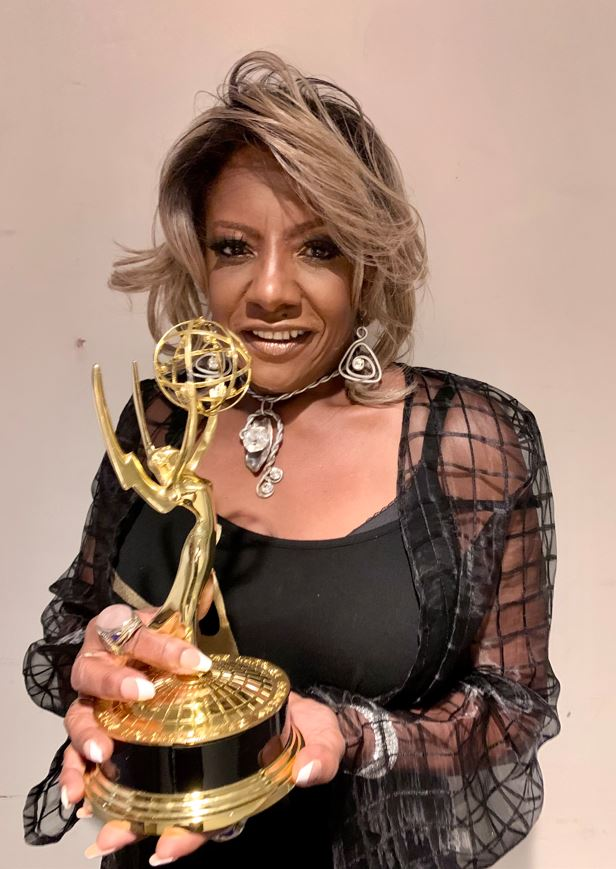
- Alyson in Atlantic City, NJ; September 22, 2024

Background information
- Born: May 11, 1961 (age 65); New York City, New York
- Origin: New York City
- Genres: R&B; House
- Instrument: Vocals
- Years active: 1980–1992, 2004–present
- Labels: Profile Records; Def Jam; Columbia
- Formerly of: High Fashion

Alyson Williams (born May 11, 1961) is a R&B singer and on air radio personality who had a string of hit singles in the late 1980s and early 1990s. Some notable tracks include "Just Call My Name", "Sleep Talk", "My Love Is So Raw" and "I Need Your Lovin".

== Career ==
The daughter of bandleader / trumpeter Bobby Booker, she began her career by singing background vocals for various artists including the Fat Boys, Curtis Hairston, Melba Moore ("Love's Coming at Ya"), B. B. & Q. Band, Cashflow, Unlimited Touch, Bobby Brown and Barbara Mitchell before joining the group High Fashion, which also featured Meli'sa Morgan. After they disbanded, Alyson sang with the group the Affair before moving onto a solo career.

Her first single, "Yes We Can Can", was first released on Profile Records in 1986; a release on the Def Jam label followed in 1987. At the label, she established herself as an in demand vocalist, duetting with many of her label mates including Chuck Stanley ("Make You Mine Tonight") and Oran "Juice" Jones ("How to Love Again").

Her first album release and the first R&B female singer signed to Def Jam, she released the album Raw in 1989. The album produced the singles "My Love Is So Raw", featuring rapper Nikki D, and "Sleep Talk". In addition, the single "Just Call My Name" was a hit on the Billboard R&B charts reaching number #4. The song, picked up by many "Quiet storm" formats, is now considered a cult classic and continues to receive airplay. The album also included a duet with the Blue Magic vocalist Ted Mills on "We're Gonna Make It". Her single "I Need Your Lovin'" was also a #8 success in the UK, as well as another R&B hit for her.

In 1986, she portrayed her friend Phyllis Hyman in a musical play called "Thank God, The Beat Goes On", joining the Whispers to tell the story of Hyman's career. She also played the role of Marvin Gaye's mother, Alberta, in a play called "My Brother, Marvin" that was produced by Marvin's sister, Zeola.

Alyson also recorded with Tashan on the track "Do You Wanna Know", taken from his On the Horizon outing, later touring with him in the United Kingdom.

In 1991, Alyson recorded "She's Not Your Fool" for the soundtrack to the movie Livin' Large. The track also appeared on her 1991 self-titled album.

In 2015, Williams became an on air radio personality at WHCR-FM 90.3. She is the host of, "Love Notes With Alyson Williams in The Chill Zone", which air on Tuesdays out of Harlem, NY.

In May of 2022, Williams was the featured artist on saxophonist Najee's cover of Norman Connors single, Valentine Love.

== Discography ==
=== Studio albums ===
Year	Album	Peak chart positions		Certifications	Record label
Year	Album	US R&B	UK	Certifications	Record label
1989	Raw	25	29	BPI: Gold	Def Jam/Columbia
1992	Alyson Williams	31	—		OBR/Columbia
2004	It's About Time	—	—		Three Keys Music
"—" denotes a recording that did not chart or was not released in that territory.

=== Extended plays ===
- Cooked: The Remix Album (1990, Def Jam)

=== Singles ===
Year	Single	Peak chart Positions						Album
Year	Single	US R&B	US Dan	IRE	NL	NZ	UK	Album
1986	"Yes We Can Can"	—	—	—	—	—	—	—N/a
1987	"Make You Mine Tonight" (with Chuck Stanley)	66	—	—	—	—	—	Raw
1989	"Sleep Talk"	3	3	24	31	35	17	Raw
1989	"My Love Is So Raw" (featuring Nikki D)	12	28	—	39	—	34	Raw
1989	"I Need Your Lovin'"	5	—	—	—	—	8	Raw
1989	"Just Call My Name"	4	—	—	—	—	—	Raw
1989	"I Second That Emotion"	—	—	—	—	—	44	Cooked: The Remix Album
1990	"Not on the Outside"	35	—	—	—	—	—	Raw
1991	"She's Not Your Fool"	—	—	—	—	—	—	Alyson Williams
1992	"Can't Have My Man"	7	—	—	—	—	—	Alyson Williams
1992	"Just My Luck"	6	—	—	—	—	—	Alyson Williams
1992	"Everybody Knew but Me"	63	—	—	—	—	—	Alyson Williams
"—" denotes a recording that did not chart or was not released in that territory.
