= Thank You (Busta Rhymes song) =

Single by Busta Rhymes featuring Kanye West, Lil Wayne and Q-Tip
- Released: November 7, 2013
- Recorded: 2013
- Genre: Hip hop
- Length: 4:00
- Label: Cash Money; Republic
- Songwriters: Trevor Smith; Kanye West; Dwayne Carter; Kamaal Fareed; Kevin McCord
- Producer: Busta Rhymes

Busta Rhymes singles chronology
"Twerk It" (2013)	"Thank You" (2013)	"Calm Down" (2014)

Q-Tip singles chronology
"A Little Party Never Killed Nobody (All We Got)" (2013)	"Thank You" (2013)	"Meltdown" (2014)

Lil Wayne singles chronology
"Good Time" (2013)	"Thank You" (2013)	"Loyal" (2013)

Kanye West singles chronology
"Bound 2" (2013)	"Thank You" (2013)	"I Won" (2014)

"Thank You" is a song by American rapper Busta Rhymes. It was released on November 7, 2013 by Cash Money Records and Republic Records as the intended second single from his tenth studio album, Extinction Level Event 2: The Wrath of God. The album, released October 30, 2020 by Conglomerate and Empire, excluded both "Thank You" and "#Twerkit", the album's intended lead singles.

The song features Busta Rhymes trading verses with fellow New York rapper Q-Tip, and contains interludes from their respective label bosses, Lil Wayne (in the intro) and Kanye West (midway through). The song's production was handled by Busta Rhymes himself. It also samples Alicia Myers' 1981 song, "I Want to Thank You". While the song did not chart on the Billboard Hot 100, outside of the United States, "Thank You" peaked within the top twenty of the charts in the United Kingdom.

== Background ==
In late August 2013, "Thank You" was announced as the second single from Extinction Level Event 2: The Wrath of God. The song was revealed to be featuring Kanye West, Q-Tip and Lil Wayne and produced by Busta Rhymes himself. With this track, Busta wanted to end talk of friction between G.O.O.D. Music and YMCMB, represented both by Kanye West and Lil Wayne. In an interview with MTV Busta said, "There's been a lot of talk over the last year or two about conflict between G.O.O.D. Music and Young Money and Cash Money. I just wanted to put it to bed and create an eventful moment where me and [Lil] Wayne being Young Money/Cash Money on one team, Q-Tip and Kanye [West] be on another movement on G.O.O.D. Music, just showing that camaraderie and that alliance and just making it official on a real Hip Hop level."

The hip hop song features verses by Busta Rhymes and Q-Tip, with ad-libs by Kanye West and Lil Wayne. The song also samples Alicia Myers' 1981 song, "I Wanna Thank You."

== Recording ==
In his "The Truth" interview with Elliott Wilson, Q-Tip detailed working with Busta Rhymes on the song saying, "Busta came to my studio and we was just vibin' and he played some joints, and he played that and I was like 'Yo, what's that?'." Q-Tip then decided to get on the song and also gave Busta the idea to add Lil Wayne and Kanye West to the song.

== Release and promotion ==
"Thank You" was originally recorded by Busta Rhymes in 2012. Q-Tip revealed the song in an interview during October 2012. He promoted the song and stated that fans should start a petition for Busta Rhymes to release the song as the first single from his upcoming album. The song's audio premiered on November 6, 2013. On November 15, 2013, "Thank You" was officially released to digital download retailers.

In promotion of the single, on December 3, Busta Rhymes and Q-Tip announced a collaboration mixtape titled The Abstract and The Dragon. The mixtape was released on December 12, 2013, featuring tracks recorded throughout two decades by the two rappers. The 28-song mixtape features "Thank You," and includes skits and other songs from A Tribe Called Quest, Missy Elliott and Big Daddy Kane. The album received a 6.6 from Pitchfork. A sequel to the album, The Return of the Dragon (The Abstract Went on Vacation)—not featuring Q-Tip—was released on December 25, 2015. It received a 5.6 from Pitchfork.

== Critical reception ==
Chris Yuscavage, writing for Complex, referred to the song as "excellent".

== Music video ==
On August 24, 2013, Director X directed the music video for "Thank You" in New York City with Busta Rhymes, Kanye West, Lil Wayne and Q-Tip. It was shot during the weekend of the 2013 MTV Video Music Awards and various clips of it surfaced via Instagram. The majority of the video was shot using a green screen. On November 25, 2013, the music video was released. It features additional cameo appearances from Mack Wilds, Mack Maine, ASAP Ferg, Victor Martinez, Ayisha Diaz and ASAP Nast. The week of its release, the video was named one of the best hip hop videos of the week by XXL. By December 4, 2014, the video had already received over 10 million views on YouTube.

== Remix ==
A remix featuring Kid Capri appeared on The Abstract and The Dragon mixtape. Kid Capri slightly adds to the bassline while adjusting the chorus a bit. He replaces Kanye West and Lil Wayne in the song as he plays the hypeman.

== Track listing ==
Digital download
No.	Title	Producer(s)	Length
1.	"Thank You" (featuring Kanye West, Lil Wayne and Q-Tip)	Busta Rhymes	4:00

== Chart performance ==
Chart (2013)	Peak position
Australia (ARIA)	52
Belgium (Ultratip Bubbling Under Flanders)	35
Belgium Urban (Ultratop Flanders)	24
France (SNEP)	179
Ireland (IRMA)	87
Italy (FIMI)	96
Scottish Singles Sales (Official Charts)	11
UK Singles (Official Charts)	13
UK Hip Hop/R&B (Official Charts)	4
US Bubbling Under R&B/Hip-Hop Singles (Billboard)	7

== Certifications ==
Region	Certification	Certified units/sales
United Kingdom (BPI)	Silver	200,000^{‡}
^{‡} Sales+streaming figures based on certification alone.

== Release history ==
Country	Date	Format	Label	Ref.
United States	November 7, 2013	Mainstream urban radio	Cash Money, Republic	
United States	November 15, 2013	Digital download	Cash Money, Republic	
United Kingdom	January 13, 2014	Contemporary hit radio	Cash Money, Republic	
