= Twerk It =

"#Twerkit"

Single by Busta Rhymes featuring Nicki Minaj

from the album Extinction Level Event 2: The Wrath of God (intended)
- Released: June 17, 2013
- Recorded: 2012
- Genre: Dancehall; reggae
- Length: 3:52
- Label: Cash Money; Republic
- Songwriters: Pharrell Williams; Trevor Tahiem Smith, Jr.; Onika Maraj
- Producer: Pharrell Williams

Busta Rhymes singles chronology
| "Take You There" (2012) | "#Twerkit" (2013) | "Thank You" (2013) |

Nicki Minaj singles chronology
| "I'm Out" (2013) | "#Twerkit" (2013) | "Get Like Me" (2013) |

"Twerk It" (stylized as "#Twerkit") is a song by American rapper Busta Rhymes featuring Nicki Minaj. Written by both performers alongside its producer Pharrell Williams, the song was intended to serve as the lead single for Busta Rhymes' tenth studio album, E.L.E.2 (Extinction Level Event 2), which was delayed from 2014 to 2020; the final album did not feature this song. "Twerk It" has been said to be Jamaican-inspired and is influenced by dancehall music. A music video for the song was shot in Flatbush, New York on June 3, 2013.

== Background ==
The original version was released on May 2, 2013, online, and later as a digital download on May 17.

On May 31, Minaj hinted the release of a new song tweeting: "surprise, surprise...recording it tomorrow, shooting it on the 3rd...". It was later revealed that the recorded song was a remix of Busta Rhymes' "Twerk It". On June 6, Busta premiered the song on radio station Hot 97 with DJ Funkmaster Flex, and later made it available online.

On June 17, the remix version, which is now the official single version, was released as a digital download through iTunes. The song was released to rhythmic radio stations on June 25, 2013.

== Music video ==
A music video was shot in Flatbush at Pulse 48 directed by Director X. Minaj came to the video shoot unaware it would have such a large setup saying "I didn't know this was a real video". A behind-the-scenes video was released June 19, 2013, showing Minaj sporting a yellow and polka dot top. and appearances from DJ Khaled and Pharrell. Director X commented on the video stating: "The video will have a lot of big booty judy's".

The video was directed by Director X and premiered on July 24, 2013, on MTV2 Jams as the Jam of the Week.

A behind-the-scenes video was released on June 19, 2013, by Minaj's friend and video producer Grizz Lee. In the footage, Minaj is seen recording her verse in the studio and shooting the video the next day, sporting a studded captain's hat and twerks for the camera before shooting scenes with Busta and DJ Khaled, who gets the crew laughing with his attempt at a Jamaican accent. Pharrell also stops by the set and shares a funny moment with Nicki in the parking lot.

== Remix ==
On August 1, 2013, Busta Rhymes revealed on RapFix Live that the official remix would feature Vybz Kartel, Ne-Yo, T.I., French Montana, and Jeremih. On August 8, the remix was released featuring the mentioned artists.

== Chart performance ==
Weekly chart performance for "#Twerkit"
| Chart (2013) | Peak position |
|---|---|
| Itay (Musica e dischi) | 31 |
| US Bubbling Under R&B/Hip-Hop Singles (Billboard) | 4 |

== Release history ==
Release dates for "#Twerkit"
| Country | Date | Format | Label |
|---|---|---|---|
| United States | June 17, 2013 | Digital download | Cash Money, Republic |
| United States | June 25, 2013 | Rhythmic contemporary radio | Cash Money, Republic |
