= Leaders of the New School =

American rap group

- Origin: Long Island, New York, U.S.
- Genre: Hip hop
- Years active: 1984–1994
- Label: Elektra
- Past members: Charlie Brown; Cut Monitor Milo; Dinco D Busta Rhymes

Leaders of the New School (often abbreviated L.O.N.S.) was an American hip hop group from Long Island, New York, formed in 1984. The group consisted of Charlie Brown, Dinco D, Cut Monitor Milo, and Busta Rhymes. After being discovered by Dante Ross, the group signed with Elektra Records and was mentored by Public Enemy's production team, The Bomb Squad. Leaders of the New School was also affiliated with the Native Tongues collective, alongside acts including A Tribe Called Quest, De La Soul, and the Jungle Brothers.

The group released two studio albums, A Future Without a Past... (1991) and T.I.M.E. (The Inner Mind's Eye) (1993). Their singles included "Case of the P.T.A.", "Sobb Story", and "What's Next". In 1991, they appeared on A Tribe Called Quest's single "Scenario", which brought widespread attention to Busta Rhymes, contributing to the launch of his solo career.

Leaders of the New School disbanded in 1994 and reunited for two performances in 2012.

== History ==
=== 1986–1990: Early years ===
"They were performing with one mic, and it was three MCs, not four. Busta also did the beatbox. It was just ill. He was controlling the mic and certainly the star of the show. He was completely amazing."

— A&R Dante Ross, on the group's performance at Payday

In 1984, Leaders of the New School was formed by Long Island natives Charlie Brown (born Bryan Higgins on September 19, 1970), Busta Rhymes (born Trevor Smith, Jr. on May 20, 1972) and Dinco D (born James Jackson on November 4, 1971). Rhymes' cousin Cut Monitor Milo (born Sheldon Scott on July 4, 1970) became the group's DJ and would also rap in the group occasionally. During a performance at Payday, a roving and short-lived hip-hop party in New York's late-1980s club scene, the group was discovered by Elektra Records A&R Dante Ross. The group performed for fellow Long Island based hip hop group Public Enemy, who had already risen to prominence, at a talent show circa 1989. There, Busta Rhymes and Charlie Brown were given their respective stage names by Chuck D of Public Enemy. Shortly afterward, production team the Bomb Squad took them under their wings and taught them how to produce by spending a significant amount of time with the group.

The members of the leaders of the New School were offered the option of performing as one of two group names chosen by the Bomb Squad: Leaders of the New School or Young Black Teenagers. When they were informed by The Bomb Squad that they were mentoring another crew who were interested in taking the L.O.N.S. name, both groups were told that they would have to battle for it. Both sides had to make a song called "Fuck The Old School," and who created the better song would win the L.O.N.S. designator. The loser would have to settle for Young Black Teenagers as their group name. After Rhymes and Brown's group earned the name Leaders of the New School, the white group was named Young Black Teenagers.

There were often conflicts between group members Charlie Brown and Busta Rhymes due to power struggles between the two ever since the group was constructed and creative differences over artistic direction and musical aesthetics rooting in both considering themselves the leader of the rap group. This resulted in Rhymes separating from the group and planning to work on music by himself. Dante Ross, who was working for Elektra Records, contacted Brown and wanted to sign the group. However, Ross was adamant about signing the lineup he'd seen at Payday. Brown and Busta, who were still in high school at the time, patched things up to sign the deal.

In 1990, Leaders of the New School signed their record deal with Elektra Records and made their first appearance on Elektra's compilation album Rubaiyat: Elektra's 40th Anniversary, with a song called "Mt. Airy Groove". They were the lone rap act to be included on the compilation. They soon joined hip hop collective Native Tongues, which also included De La Soul, A Tribe Called Quest and Queen Latifah, amongst others. By 1990, the group started working on their debut album, A Future without a Past..., with Dante Ross' production team, John Gamble and Geebi Dajani, the Vibe Chemist Backspin and former mentor Eric "Vietnam" Sadler.

=== 1991–1993: A Future without a Past..., T.I.M.E. (The Inner Mind's Eye) and break up ===
On February 13, 1991, Leaders of the New school released the song "Case of the P.T.A." as their debut single. "Teachers, Don't Teach Us Nonsense" was included as the B-side. Both songs were instantly included on mixtapes and played on the radio for months. They made their first television appearance in the episode "Anton in the Burbs" of FOX's then-new hit sketch comedy series, In Living Color, performing their two newly released songs. The episode aired on February 17, 1991. BET's Rap City, MTV's Yo! MTV Raps, as well as Ralph McDaniels' Video Music Box played the music video for "Case Of The P.T.A." on regular rotation. The song peaked at number 4 on the Billboard Hot Rap Singles chart.

On June 19, 1991, the group released their second single, "Sobb Story". Posse cut "Sound of the Zeekers" featuring Cracker Jacks, Rumpletilskinz and Kollie Weed was included as the B-side. Both songs quickly caught airplay on the radio. After "Sobb Story" received an official music video, the song became even more popular and eventually peaked at number 8 on the Billboard Hot Rap Singles.

On July 30, 1991, Leaders of the New School released their debut studio album A Future without a Past.... The album contained 17 total tracks, including the previously released singles and their B-sides. The songs revolve around common problems the youth may face in their day-to-day life. Each group member except Milo had at least one solo song on the album. Fourth member and the group's DJ Cut Monitor Milo only appeared on two of fourteen actual songs.

They produced three tracks on American rapper Nikki D's sole studio album Daddy's Little Girl, released in September 1991. That same month, they appeared on A Tribe Called Quest's posse cut "Scenario" from their second studio album The Low End Theory. Leaders member Busta Rhymes attracted attention with his verse in the song, which led to him launching a successful solo career. In October, they once again appeared in In Living Color in the episode "Green Eggs and the Guvment Cheese" again performing "Teachers, Don't Teach Us Nonsense". In the same month, they also appeared on the Strictly Business soundtrack, with the song "Shining Star".

On March 13, 1992, A Tribe Called Quest's "Scenario" was issued as a single and received an official music video. Additionally, a remix was included as the B-side and featured a newcomer named Kid Hood, who was murdered three days after recording his verse, alongside A Tribe Called Quest and the Leaders of the New School. In the same month, "The International Zone Coaster" was released as the third and last single from A Future without a Past.... On April 11, 1992, the song hit number 1 on the Billboard Hot Rap Singles. A live performance of "Scenario" with Leaders of the New School on The Arsenio Hall Show led to greater popularity.

In January 1993, Leaders of the New School produced and featured on James Brown's single "Can't Get Any Harder".

The group's second and final album was T.I.M.E. ("The Inner Mind's Eye"), released in 1993, and spawning the singles "What's Next", "Time Will Tell" & "Classic Material".

As time passed, fans and critics began to focus less on LONS as a group and more on Busta Rhymes as a solo artist. During an infamous appearance on the TV show Yo! MTV Raps, the group was seen arguing, with member Charlie Brown becoming upset over Rhymes' show-stealing. The group soon split up, with Charlie Brown, Dinco D and Milo garnering very limited success individually, while Busta Rhymes' popularity continued to increase.

The group made an appearance on Rhymes' 1996 debut album The Coming, on the track "Keep It Movin'" and was the last time they would collaborate as a group. In July 2012, the group reunited on stage during Busta Rhymes' headlining set at the Brooklyn Hip-Hop Festival, to perform "Case of the P.T.A." and "Scenario" in its entirety with A Tribe Called Quest. The group later reunited again in 2015 on the song "We Home" from Busta Rhymes' mixtape The Return Of The Dragon: The Abstract Went On Vacation.

== Reunion ==
The group reunited for two shows in 2012. Dinco D released his debut solo album Cameo Flows on November 4, 2016. The album features appearances by fellow members Charlie Brown and Cut Monitor Milo.

In December 2016, Dinco D and Charlie Brown announced on The Library With Tim Einenkel podcast that the group was working on new material together but did not give any indication to when it would be released. The following month, Busta Rhymes made similar comments on N.O.R.E. & DJ EFN's Drink Champs podcast.

== Discography ==
Album information
A Future Without a Past...
- Released: July 2, 1991
- Billboard 200 chart position: No. 128
- R&B/Hip-Hop chart position: No. 53
- Singles: "Case of the P.T.A.", "Sobb Story" & "The International Zone Coaster"
T.I.M.E.
- Released: October 12, 1993
- Billboard 200 chart position: No. 66
- R&B/Hip-Hop chart position: No. 15
- Singles: "What's Next", "Time Will Tell" & "Classic Material"
