= Extinction Level Event 2: The Wrath of God =

Studio album by Busta Rhymes
- Released: October 30, 2020
- Recorded: 2013–2020
- Genre: Hip hop
- Length: 77:36
- Label: The Conglomerate; Empire
- Producer: Busta Rhymes (exec.); Nottz; Avenue Beatz; J Dilla; Swizz Beatz; Pete Rock; Rockwilder; Dready; Focus...; DJ Scratch; DJ Premier; Hi-Tek; Terrace Martin; Anderson .Paak; Schife; 9th Wonder; Rick Rock; Navi Beats; Murda Beatz; Jahlil Beats; M1onthebeat; Scoop DeVille; Sha Recka; Mini Boom

Busta Rhymes chronology
Year of the Dragon (2012)	Extinction Level Event 2: The Wrath of God (2020)	Blockbusta (2023)

Singles from Extinction Level Event 2: The Wrath of God
- 1. "The Don and the Boss" Released: August 21, 2020; 2. "Yuuuu" Released: September 18, 2020; 3. "Look Over Your Shoulder" Released: October 29, 2020; 4. "Where I Belong" Released: April 7, 2021

Extinction Level Event 2: The Wrath of God is the tenth studio album by American rapper Busta Rhymes, published on October 30, 2020. The album features guest appearances from Eminem, Kendrick Lamar, Mariah Carey, Anderson .Paak, Q-Tip, Rick Ross, Mary J. Blige, Rapsody, Ol' Dirty Bastard, Rakim, Pete Rock, Vybz Kartel, Bell Biv DeVoe, M.O.P., Nikki Grier, Chris Rock, and Louis Farrakhan. It is a sequel to 1998's E.L.E. (Extinction Level Event): The Final World Front, and his first studio album since 2012's Year of the Dragon.

Extinction Level Event 2: The Wrath of God was met with generally favorable reviews and debuted at number seven on the US Billboard 200 chart, earning 38,000 album-equivalent units in its first week.

== Background ==
Busta Rhymes first announced the album in 2013. Over the course of 2014, Busta Rhymes continued to do interviews promoting the album, and released the singles "Twerk It" featuring Nicki Minaj, "Thank You" featuring Q-Tip, Lil Wayne and Kanye West, and "Calm Down" featuring Eminem. Despite the promotion around this time, promotion for the album ceased in July 2014, when it was announced that Rhymes had amicably departed Cash Money Records.

The album was announced again on August 17, 2020, via a YouTube video starring Chris Rock. It was released officially on October 30, 2020. The "Reloaded" version of the album was released on November 2, 2020, featuring three new tracks and the previously released 2014 single "Calm Down" with Eminem. An official deluxe edition was also released later that month, on November 27, 2020, featuring the bonus tracks from the Reloaded reissue as well as four additional tracks, including a remix of "Czar" with new verses by M.O.P. and rapper CJ.

== Singles ==
The album's lead single "The Don and the Boss", featuring Vybz Kartel and J-Doe, was released on August 21, 2020. The album's second single "YUUUU" featuring Anderson .Paak was released on September 18, 2020. "Where I Belong" featuring Mariah Carey was released as the album's third single on April 7, 2021, and is set to be released to American rhythmic contemporary radio stations on April 13.

== Critical reception ==
Professional ratings
Aggregate scores
Source	Rating
Metacritic	71/100
Review scores
Source	Rating
Albumism	5/5 stars
AllMusic	3/5 stars
Clash	4/10
HipHopDX	4.0/5
Joe Boothby	8/10
The Musical Hype	3.5/5 stars
Music Connection	9/10
NME	4/5 stars
Riff Magazine	7/10
Vinyl Chapters	2.5/5

Extinction Level Event 2: The Wrath of God was met with generally favorable reviews. At Metacritic, which assigns a normalized rating out of 100 to reviews from mainstream publications, the album received an average score of 71, based on six reviews.

== Commercial performance ==
Extinction Level Event 2: The Wrath of God debuted at number seven on the US Billboard 200 chart, earning 38,000 album-equivalent units (including 17,000 copies as pure album sales) in its first week. This became Busta Rhymes' seventh US top-ten album. The album also accumulated a total of 27.78 million on-demand streams of the album's songs that week.

== Track listing ==
Extinction Level Event 2: The Wrath of God track listing
No.	Title	Writer(s)	Producer(s)	Length
1.	"E.L.E. 2 Intro" (with Chris Rock, Rakim, and Pete Rock)	Trevor Smith; Christopher Rock; William Griffin, Jr.; Peter Phillips; Dominick Lamb; Anita Ward; Chuck Holmes; Jimmy Lowe; N. Jones	Busta Rhymes; Nottz	7:12
2.	"The Purge"	T. Smith; Kasseem Dean; Avery "Avenue" Chambliss	Swizz Beatz; Avenue	1:10
3.	"Strap Yourself Down"	T. Smith; James Yancey; Phillips	J Dilla; Pete Rock	2:57
4.	"Czar" (with M.O.P.)	T. Smith; Jamal Grinnage; Eric Murray; Dana Stinson; Darryl Pittman	Rockwilder	3:01
5.	"Outta My Mind" (featuring Bell Biv DeVoe)	T. Smith; Ricky Bell; Michael Bivins; Ronnie DeVoe; Karl "Dready" Daniel; Elliot Straite	Busta Rhymes; Dready	3:20
6.	"E.L.E. 2 The Wrath of God" (featuring Minister Louis Farrakhan)	T. Smith; Louis Farrakhan; D. Lamb	Busta Rhymes; Nottz	4:43
7.	"Slow Flow" (with Ol' Dirty Bastard)	T. Smith; Russell Jones; D. Lamb; O. Harris	Nottz	3:12
8.	"Don't Go" (with Q-Tip)	T. Smith; Kamaal Fareed; Bernard "Focus the A.R.M" Edwards, Jr.	Focus the A.R.M	3:49
9.	"Boomp!"	T. Smith; George Spivey	DJ Scratch	3:01
10.	"True Indeed"	T. Smith; Christopher Martin	DJ Premier	1:53
11.	"Master Fard Muhammad" (with Rick Ross)	T. Smith; William Roberts II; Tony Cottrell; Terrace Martin	Hi-Tek; T. Martin	3:59
12.	"YUUUU" (with Anderson .Paak)	T. Smith; Brandon Anderson	Anderson .Paak	3:30
13.	"Oh No"	T. Smith; Daniel	Dready	3:26
14.	"The Don & the Boss" (with Vybz Kartel)	T. Smith; Adidja Palmer; Ian "Schife" Lewis	Schife	3:42
15.	"Best I Can" (with Rapsody)	T. Smith; Marlanna Evans; Patrick Douthit; R. Arrington; C. Tyson	9th Wonder	3:39
16.	"Where I Belong" (featuring Mariah Carey)	T. Smith; Mariah Carey; Ricardo Thomas; Michel Sotolongo; J. J Doe Smith	Rick Rock; Navi Beats	4:12
17.	"Deep Thought"	T. Smith; Dale Warren	Busta Rhymes	3:10
18.	"The Young God Speaks"	Berry Gordy; Bob West; Willie Hutchison; Hal Davis; Warren		0:40
19.	"Look Over Your Shoulder" (featuring Kendrick Lamar)	T. Smith; Kendrick Duckworth; D. Lamb; Gordy; West; Hutchison; Davis; B. Bennett	Nottz	4:08
20.	"You Will Never Find Another Me" (featuring Mary J. Blige)	T. Smith; Mary J. Blige; Nikki Grier; Roy Hawkins; Rick Darnell	Busta Rhymes	3:50
21.	"Freedom?" (featuring Nikki Grier)	T. Smith; Grier; D. Lamb; Robert Kral	Nottz	3:48
22.	"Satanic"	T. Smith; Stinson	Rockwilder	5:14

Reloaded bonus tracks
No.	Title	Writer(s)	Producer(s)	Length
23.	"Blowing the Speakers"	T. Smith; Shane Lindstrom	Murda Beatz	3:18
24.	"Who Are You"	T. Smith; Orlando Tucker	Jahlil Beats	3:54
25.	"Hope Your Dreams Come True"	T. Smith	M1onthebeat	3:29
26.	"Calm Down" (featuring Eminem)	T. Smith; Marshall Mathers; Elijah Molina; Christopher Wallace; Osten Harvey Jr.; Gordy; West; Hutchison; Davis; Earl Nelson; Bobby Relf; Lawrence Muggerud; Eric Schrody	Scoop DeVille	5:55

Deluxe bonus tracks
No.	Title	Writer(s)	Producer(s)	Length
27.	"Czar (Remix)" (with M.O.P. and CJ)	T. Smith; Grinnage; Murray; Christopher Soriano; Stinson	Rockwilder	3:39
28.	"Follow the Wave" (featuring Flipmode Squad)	T. Smith; Roger "Rampage" McNair; Rashia "Rah Digga" Fisher; William "Spliff Star" Lewis; D. Lamb	Nottz	6:43
29.	"Blow a Million Racks"	T. Smith; Thaddaeus Birkett	Sha Recka	3:28
30.	"Hey You" (featuring Trillian)	T. Smith; Trillian Wood-Smith; Douglas	Mini Boom	3:48

Leftover tracks

- "Thank You" (featuring Q-Tip, Lil Wayne, and Kanye West)
- "Twerk It" (featuring Nicki Minaj)
- "Aaahhhh!!!" (featuring Swizz Beatz)
- "Girlfriend" (featuring Vybz Kartel and Tory Lanez)
- "Get It" (featuring Missy Elliott and Kelly Rowland)

== Charts ==
Chart performance for Extinction Level Event 2: The Wrath of God
Chart (2020)	Peak position
Canadian Albums (Billboard)	26
French Albums (SNEP)	144
Swiss Albums (Schweizer Hitparade)	32
UK Albums (OCC)	99
UK R&B Albums (OCC)	4
US Billboard 200	7
US Top R&B/Hip-Hop Albums (Billboard)	4
