= Sobb Story =

Single by Leaders of the New School

from the album A Future Without a Past...
- Released: 1991
- Recorded: 1991
- Genre: Hip-hop
- Length: 4:51
- Label: Elektra
- Songwriter(s): Bryan Higgins, James Jackson, Trevor Smith Jr., Eric Sadler
- Producer(s): Eric "Vietnam" Sadler

Leaders of the New School singles chronology
"Case of the P.T.A." (1991)	"Sobb Story" (1991)	"The International Zone Coaster" (1992)

Music video
- "Sobb Story" on YouTube

"Sobb Story" is the second single from Leaders of the New School's debut album A Future Without a Past..., where it followed up at #8 at Hop Hip Singles charts. Produced by Eric "Vietnam" Sadler of The Bomb Squad, it contains samples from the Hugo Montenegro recording "Aces High".

== Music video ==
The video opens with an introduction where a car engine comes on and the tailpipe starts to sputter. As we originally see the group riding on the front of the car and dancing to the rhythm while they are going to a house party, Leaders of the New School comes in with a smooth-like, mellow flow. Busta Rhymes is the first to spill his lyrical lines about his ups & downs. Charlie Brown comes in with a second verse right after Busta and begins to flow on. Then Dinco D drops his last verse with a little ad-lib into the song. As the Leaders are performing in front of the people, the music fades and the video ends.

== Track listing ==
=== 12 inch ===
A-Side

1. Sobb Story (LP Version) (4:51)
2. Sobb Story (Trackmasters Remix) (4:21)
3. Sobb Story (Instrumental) (3:37)

B-Side

1. Sound of the Zeekers @#^**?! (LP Version) (5:16)
2. Sound of the Zeekers @#^**?! (Instrumental) (5:16)
3. Case of the P.T.A. (Remix) (4:02)
