= A Future Without a Past... =

Studio album by Leaders of the New School
- Released: July 2, 1991
- Recorded: 1990–1991
- Genre: Alternative hip hop
- Length: 66:06
- Label: Elektra
- Producers: Busta Rhymes; Charlie Brown; Cut Monitor Milo; Dinco D; Eric "Vietnam" Sadler; Geeby Dajani; John Gamble; Mr. Dante Ross; The Vibe Chemist Backspin

Leaders of the New School chronology
A Future Without a Past... (1991)	T.I.M.E. (The Inner Mind's Eye) (1993)

Singles from A Future Without a Past...
- 1. "Case of the P.T.A." Released: 1991; 2. "Sobb Story" Released: 1991; 3. "The International Zone Coaster" Released: 1992

A Future Without a Past... is the debut studio album from American hip hop group Leaders of the New School. It was released in 1991 on Elektra Records.

== Production ==
A Future Without a Past... is a loose concept album about high school, divided into three parts.

== Critical reception ==
Professional ratings
Review scores
Source	Rating
AllMusic	5/5 stars
The Encyclopedia of Popular Music	3/5 stars
RapReviews	8/10
The Village Voice	(dud)

The Baltimore Sun noted that "the group modulates the density of each track, [so] there's always a sense of flow to the sound, of tension and release, buildup and climax."

Stanton Swihart of AllMusic praised the work, calling the group's debut "one of the most infectious rap albums ever created." Trouser Press called the album "highly amiable," writing that the group's "subtle Afrocentric politics came coated in tasty upbeat rhymes." Complex wrote that the album revives "the barbershop quartet-style group dynamics of early hip-hop crews like the Treacherous 3 and the Cold Crush Brothers." Fact called it "a jolly throwback affair ... enlivened by Busta's freewheeling presence and some smart production work."

== Track listing ==
A Future Without a Past...
No.	Title	Writer(s)	Producer(s)	Length
1.	"Homeroom"			2:25
2.	"Case of the P.T.A."	Bryan Higgins; Trevor Smith Jr.; James Jackson; Sheldon Scott	Cut Monitor Milo	3:42
3.	"Too Much on My Mind"	Higgins; Jackson; Marlon King	The Vibe Chemist Backspin	4:26
4.	"What's the Pinocchio's Theory?"	Higgins; King	The Vibe Chemist Backspin	3:43
5.	"Just When You Thought It Was Safe..."	Higgins; Smith; Jackson; Eric Sadler	Eric "Vietnam" Sadler	2:30
6.	"Lunchroom"			2:30
7.	"Sound of the Zeekers @#^**?!" (featuring Cracker Jacks, Rumpletilskinz and Kollie Weed)	Higgins; Smith; Jackson; Scott; Desmon Gordon; B. Freedom; Shawn Oliver; K. Porter; T. Pierce; E. Romero; Koolie Weed	Busta Rhymes	5:16
8.	"Sobb Story"	Higgins; Smith; Jackson; Sadler	Eric "Vietnam" Sadler	4:51
9.	"Feminine Fatt"	Smith; King	The Vibe Chemist Backspin	3:08
10.	"Transformers"	Higgins; Smith; Jackson; John Gamble; Dante Ross; Najeeb Dajani	John Gamble; Mr. Dante Ross; Geeby Dajani	4:00
11.	"Afterschool"			1:24
12.	"Show Me a Hero"	Smith; King	The Vibe Chemist Backspin	4:35
13.	"Trains, Planes and Automobiles"	Higgins; Smith; Jackson; Sadler	Eric "Vietnam" Sadler	4:04
14.	"The International Zone Coaster"	Higgins; Smith; Jackson; John Gamble; Dante Ross; Najeeb Dajani	John Gamble; Mr. Dante Ross; Geeby Dajani	5:05
15.	"Teachers, Don't Teach Us Nonsense!!"	Higgins; Smith; Jackson	Leaders of the New School	4:06
16.	"My Ding-a-Ling"	Jackson; Scott	Dinco D; Cut Monitor Milo	3:41
17.	"Where Do We Go from Here?"	Higgins; Smith; Jackson; Scott	Charlie Brown	6:51

== Charts ==
Chart (1991)	Peak position
U.S. Billboard 200	128
U.S. Heatseekers	1
U.S. R&B Albums	53

== Personnel ==
- assistant engineering – John Gamble
- engineering – Dr. Shane Faber, Mike Mangini, Christopher Shaw
- mixing – Busta Rhymes, Charlie Brown, Geeby Dajani, John Gamble, Dante Ross, Eric "Vietnam" Sadler
- production – Busta Rhymes, Charlie Brown, Cut Monitor Milo, Geeby Dajani, Dinco D, John Gamble, Leaders of the New School, Dante Ross, Eric "Vietnam" Sadler
