= T.I.M.E. (The Inner Mind's Eye) =

Studio album by Leaders of the New School
- Released: October 12, 1993
- Recorded: 1992–1993
- Studios: Apollo Studios (New York, NY); Platinum Island Studios (New York, NY); The Music Palace (Long Island, NY); Chung King House Of Metal (New York, NY)
- Genre: Hip-hop
- Length: 1:01:15
- Label: Elektra
- Producers: Busta Rhymes; Charlie Brown; Cut Monitor Milo; Dinco D; R.P.M.; Raheem Isom; Sam Sever; the Vibe Chemist Backspin

Leaders of the New School chronology
A Future Without a Past... (1991)	T.I.M.E. (The Inner Mind's Eye) (1993)

Busta Rhymes chronology
A Future Without a Past... (1991)	T.I.M.E. (The Inner Mind's Eye) (1993)	The Coming (1996)

Dinco D chronology
A Future Without a Past... (1991)	T.I.M.E. (The Inner Mind's Eye) (1993)	Cameo Flows (2016)

Singles from T.I.M.E. (The Inner Mind's Eye)
- 1. "What's Next" Released: August 26, 1993; 2. "Classic Material" Released: January 1994

T.I.M.E. (The Inner Mind's Eye) is the second and final studio album by American hip-hop group Leaders of the New School. It was released on October 12, 1993, via Elektra Records. The recording sessions took place at Apollo Studios, Platinum Island Studios, The Music Palace and Chung King House of Metal in New York. The album was produced by group members Busta Rhymes, Charlie Brown, Cut Monitor Milo and Dinco D, as well as the Vibe Chemist Backspin, Raheem Isom, Rampage, R.P.M., and Sam Sever. It features guest appearances from Blitz, Brittle Lo, Collie Weed, Cool Whip, Jeranimo, the Capital L.S., Pudge God, Rampage, and Sha-Now.

The album peaked at number 66 on the Billboard 200 and number 15 on the Top R&B/Hip-Hop Albums charts in the United States. It was supported with two singles: "What's Next" and "Classic Material". Its lead single, "What's Next", made it to number 77 on the Hot R&B/Hip-Hop Songs, number 1 on the Hot Rap Songs and number 7 on the Dance Singles Sales charts. The second single off of the album, "Classic Material", reached number 20 on the Dance Singles Sales chart.

The album did not fare as well as their debut album, garnering a mixed critical reception. After the album's release, the group began having both creative and personal problems, resulting in their disbandment.

== Critical reception ==
Professional ratings
Review scores
Source	Rating
AllMusic	3/5 stars
RapReviews	7/10
The Source	4/5 stars

Dream Hampton of The Source called the album "a rarity in hip-hop—a sophomore album that is better than the debut", further stating, "you can't help waiting for Busta to get on the mic". AllMusic's Stanton Swihart described it as "an endlessly interesting listen", concluding that "T.I.M.E. is a much more mature work, both musically and lyrically" than A Future Without a Past....

== Track listing ==
No.	Title	Lyrics	Producer(s)	Length
1.	"Eternal"			1:28
2.	"Understanding the Inner Mind's Eye"	Trevor Smith; Bryan Higgins; James Jackson	Charlie Brown	3:04
3.	"Syntax Era"	Smith; Jackson; Higgins	The Vibe Chemist Backspin	4:38
4.	"Classic Material"	Smith; Jackson; Sheldon Scott; Higgins	The Vibe Chemist Backspin; Busta Rhymes	3:59
5.	"Daily Reminder"	Higgins; Smith; Jackson	R.P.M.	3:39
6.	"A Quarter to Cutthroat"	Scott; Jackson; Higgins; Smith	Charlie Brown	4:53
7.	"Connections"	Jackson; Scott; Higgins; Smith	Cut Monitor Milo; Busta Rhymes	4:03
8.	"What's Next?"	Jackson; Scott; Higgins; Smith	Dinco D	4:37
9.	"Droppin' It-4-1990-Ever"			0:29
10.	"Time Will Tell"	Jackson; Smith; Scott; Higgins	The Vibe Chemist Backspin; Rampage	4:58
11.	"Bass Is Loaded"	Smith; Scott; Jackson; Higgins	Busta Rhymes	4:30
12.	"Spontaneous (13 MC's Deep!)" (featuring Cracker Jax, Rampage, Blitz, Rumpletilskinz, Pudge God and Collie Weed)	Higgins; Jackson; Smith; Scott; Cool Whip; Brittle Lo; Roger McNair; Blitz; Jacob Clark; Pudge God; Desmon Gordon; Jeranimo; Garfield Mitchell	Sam Sever	4:39
13.	"Noisy Meditation"	Smith; Higgins; Jackson; Scott	Busta Rhymes	4:15
14.	"The End Is Near"	Higgins; Smith; Jackson; Scott	Raheem Isom	4:23
15.	"Zearocks"			1:24
16.	"The Difference"	Smith; Higgins; Jackson; Scott	Busta Rhymes	5:28
17.	"Final Solution"	Smith; Jackson		0:36
Total length:				1:01:15

Notes

- Unreleased tracks "Emotional" and "Oooh Baby" were left off the album.

== Personnel ==
- Trevor "Busta Rhymes" Smith – vocals, producer (tracks: 4, 7, 11, 13, 16)
- James "Dinco D" Jackson – vocals, producer (track 8)
- Bryan "Charlie Brown" Higgins – vocals, producer (tracks: 2, 6)
- Sheldon "Cut Monitor Milo" Scott – vocals, producer (track 7)
- Cool Whip – vocals (track 12)
- Brittle Lo – vocals (track 12)
- Roger "Rampage" McNair – vocals (track 12), producer (track 10)
- Blitz – vocals (track 12)
- Jacob "The Capital L.S." Clark – vocals (track 12)
- Pudge God – vocals (track 12)
- Desmon "Sha-Now" Gordon – vocals (track 12)
- Jeranimo – vocals (track 12)
- Garfield "Collie Weed" Mitchell – vocals (track 12)
- Michael Feliz – bass (track 10)
- Marlon "The Vibe Chemist Backspin" King – producer (tracks: 3, 4, 10)
- Peter "R.P.M." Lopez – producer (track 5)
- Sam "Sever" Citrin – producer (track 12)
- Raheem Isom – producer (track 14)
- Kevin Reynolds – mixing, engineering (tracks: 2–5, 10, 11, 13, 14, 17)
- Alan Scott Plotkin – engineering (tracks: 1, 9)
- Rob 'Void' – engineering (tracks: 6–8, 12, 15, 16)
- Tom Coyne – mastering
- Kevin Wood – illustration
- Michael Lavine – photography

== Charts ==
Chart (1993)	Peak position
US Billboard 200	66
US Top R&B Albums (Billboard)	15
