= Nikki D =

American rapper

- Born: Nichelle Dayveena Strong; September 10, 1968 (age 57)
- Genres: Hip-hop
- Occupations: Rapper; emcee
- Years active: 1987–1995
- Label: Def Jam

Nichelle Dayveena Strong (born September 10, 1968), known by her stage name Nikki D is an American rapper.

== Career ==
Strong signed with Def Jam in 1989 and released her debut single "Lettin' Off Steam" the following year. It was produced by Sam Sever. The single's video featured Flavor Flav. In 1991, Strong released the more commercially viable song, "Daddy's Little Girl", which appeared on the Indie film Just Another Girl on the I.R.T. soundtrack, reaching #1 on the US Billboard Hot Rap Singles chart.

In 1997 she sang "Recondita Armonica" on the concept album The Rapsody Overture.

Prior to releasing "Daddy's Little Girl", Strong was on tour in Europe for a year with fellow R&B artist Alyson Williams. Strong has recorded songs with Moby, Queen Latifah on the Set It Off soundtrack, with Redman for his Muddy Waters album, EPMD, Naughty By Nature, Flavor Unit and Suzanne Vega.

== Discography ==
=== Album ===
- 1991: Daddy's Little Girl (Def Jam) - US R&B #54

=== Singles ===
Single	Year	Peak positions						Album
Single	Year	US Dance	US R&B	US Rap	AUS	NZ	UK	Album
"Lettin' Off Steam"	1990	—	—	—	—	—	—	Daddy's Little Girl
"Daddy's Little Girl"	1991	19	31	1	59	34	75	Daddy's Little Girl
"Hang On Kid"	1991	—	—	—	112	—	—	Daddy's Little Girl
"Wasted"	1991	—	—	—	—	—	—	Daddy's Little Girl
"Freak Out"	1993	—	—	20	—	—	—	single only
"—" denotes releases that did not chart or were not released.
