= Busta Rhymes =

American rapper (born 1972)

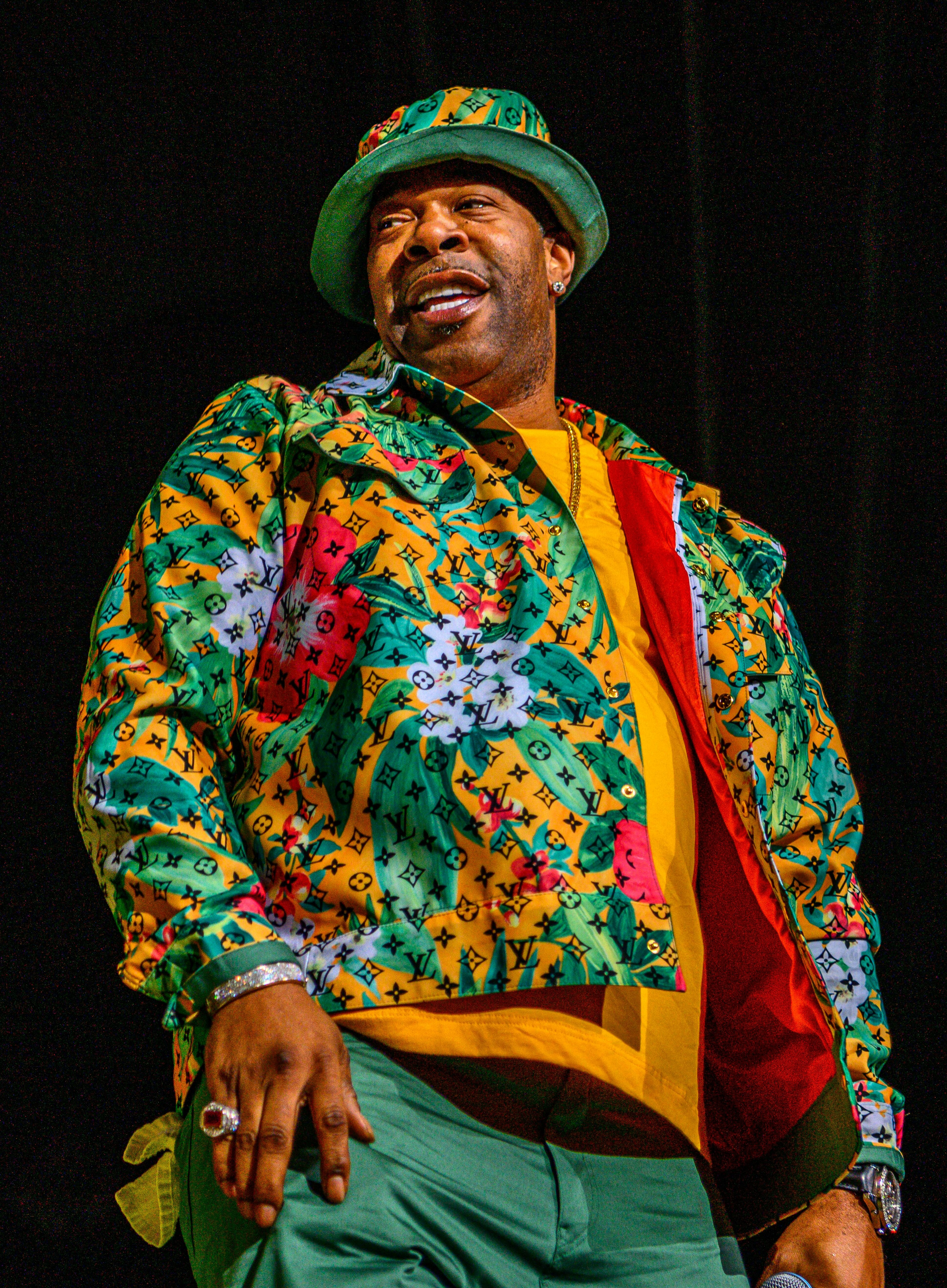
- Busta Rhymes performing in 2022
- Born: Trevor George Smith Jr. May 20, 1972 (age 54); New York City, U.S.
- Other name: Trevor Taheim Smith
- Education: Uniondale High School
- Occupations: Rapper; songwriter; record producer; actor; record executive; businessman
- Years active: 1986–present
- Works: Discography; production
- Children: 6
- Relatives: Rampage (cousin)
- Awards: Full list
- Musical career
- Origin: Hempstead, New York, U.S.
- Genres: East Coast hip-hop; progressive rap
- Instruments: Vocals; samplers; drums
- Labels: Empire; Conglomerate; Epic; Violator; Republic; Cash Money; Young Money; Universal Motown; Interscope; Aftermath; J; Elektra
- Member of: Flipmode Squad
- Formerly of: Leaders of the New School
- Website: bustarhymesuniverse.com

Trevor George Smith Jr. (born May 20, 1972), known professionally as Busta Rhymes, is an American rapper, record producer, record executive, and actor. He has received 12 Grammy Award nominations, making him one of the most-nominated artists without a win. Billboard and Vibe ranked him among the 50 Greatest Rappers of All Time, while Forbes listed him among the greatest rappers on their list of the "50 Top Rappers of All Time". Chuck D of Public Enemy gave him the moniker Busta Rhymes, after NFL and CFL wide receiver George "Buster" Rhymes.

Rhymes was an original member of Leaders of the New School, a group that attracted national attention while opening on tour for Public Enemy. He gained further exposure for their guest appearance on A Tribe Called Quest's "Scenario". Shortly after, Leaders of the New School disbanded, leading Rhymes to become a sought-after solo artist, appearing on numerous tracks for other artists before his debut solo album, The Coming (1996). Critically acclaimed, the album debuted within the top 10 of the Billboard 200, received platinum certification by the Recording Industry Association of America (RIAA), and was nominated for a Grammy Award.

He has released eleven total solo albums, with the most recent being Blockbusta (2023). His most notable singles include "Woo-Hah!! Got You All in Check", "It's a Party", "Put Your Hands Where My Eyes Could See", "Dangerous", "Turn It Up" (Remix)/"Fire It Up", "Gimme Some More", "What's It Gonna Be?!", "Pass the Courvoisier, Part II", "I Know What You Want" and "Touch It". He has also featured on the hit songs "Don't Cha" by The Pussycat Dolls, "Rumble in the Jungle" by Fugees, and "Look at Me Now" by Chris Brown. In addition to his music career, he founded the record label Conglomerate (formerly Flipmode Entertainment) and its namesake hip-hop collective (formerly known as Flipmode Squad). In 2025, Busta Rhymes was awarded the inaugural Rock the Bells Visionary Award by the MTV Video Music Awards.

== Early life ==
Trevor George Smith Jr. was born in the East Flatbush neighborhood of Brooklyn, New York City, on May 20, 1972, to Geraldine Green and Trevor Smith Sr., who both were immigrants from Jamaica. At age 12, Smith's family moved to Nassau County on Long Island and settled in Uniondale, New York.

For a short while, Smith attended George Westinghouse Career and Technical Education High School in Brooklyn with future rappers Christopher "The Notorious B.I.G." Wallace and Shawn "Jay-Z" Carter, and attended Samuel J. Tilden High School with Edward "Special Ed" Archer and Roderick "Chip Fu" Roachford of Fu-Schnickens. Smith graduated from Uniondale High School in 1991.

Busta also spent time in England during the early 1980s where he lived with his maternal aunt. She lived in Morecambe, and he spent two summers there with his mother and younger brother. He went to Skerton Community High School while he was staying in the area. He told GQ in a 2020 interview, "One summer when we went down there I was 12, my brother was eight, so my aunt made sure that we actually went to school in England. Regular school and then we went to karate school too. We also were on some breakdancing that was so crazy, we ended up actually getting work to breakdance in clubs as minors. And our cousins used to run us around and they used to advertise us as TJ and Paul."

== Career ==
=== 1986–1995: Leaders of the New School and rising popularity ===
"They were performing with one mic, and it was three MCs, not four. Busta also did the beatbox. It was just ill. He was controlling the mic and certainly the star of the show. He was completely amazing."

— A&R Dante Ross, on the group's performance at Payday

In 1986, Smith, alongside fellow Long Island natives Charlie Brown, Cut Monitor Milo, and Dinco D, formed the East Coast hip-hop group Leaders of the New School.

Leaders of the New School released their debut album, A Future Without a Past..., in July 1991 on Elektra Records. Later that year, the group appeared on A Tribe Called Quest's critically acclaimed posse cut "Scenario". In 1993, they released T.I.M.E. (The Inner Mind's Eye). Smith gained popularity from his advanced rhymes, as well as his unique style that was not common of many New York rap artists at the time. Soon after, however, internal problems arose because of his increasing popularity, and the group broke up on the set of Yo! MTV Raps.

"I was like the first artist to really start rhyming on everyone else's record. And I was doing that because it was a quick way to feed my kid. That's what was going on until, you know, I got to a place where I felt comfortable enough with doing a solo album."

— Busta Rhymes

=== 1996–1999: The Coming, When Disaster Strikes, and Extinction Level Event: The Final World Front ===
In 1996, Busta Rhymes released his debut solo album, The Coming. His single "Woo Hah!! Got You All in Check" was a success, pushing the album into gold record status. Later, he started work on his second album, When Disaster Strikes, which would not be released until September 1997.

In 1998, Busta Rhymes recorded Extinction Level Event: The Final World Front.

=== 2000–2004: Anarchy, Genesis, and It Ain't Safe No More ===
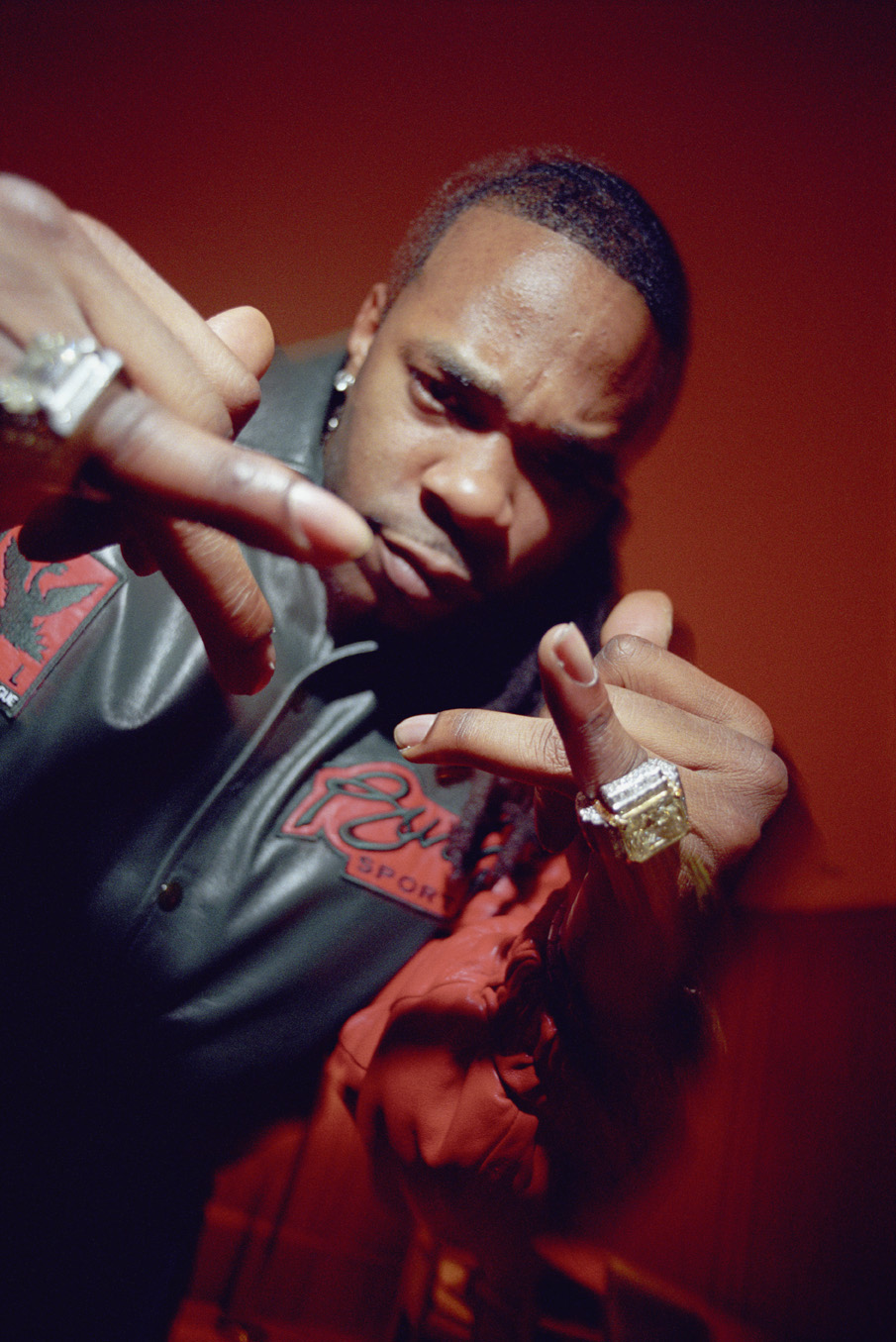
Busta Rhymes in 2002

In 2000, Busta Rhymes released his final album for Elektra, titled Anarchy.

In February 2001, Busta Rhymes signed with J Records under the leadership of Clive Davis. That November, Busta Rhymes released his fifth studio album, Genesis. It later sold one million domestic copies and was certified Platinum by RIAA. The album featured collaborations with Mary J. Blige, P. Diddy, Kelis, and others.

In 2002, Busta Rhymes released his sixth studio album, It Ain't Safe No More. On January 6, 2003, It Ain't Safe No More... was certified Gold by the Recording Industry Association of America (RIAA).

=== 2005–2009: The Big Bang and Back on My B.S. ===
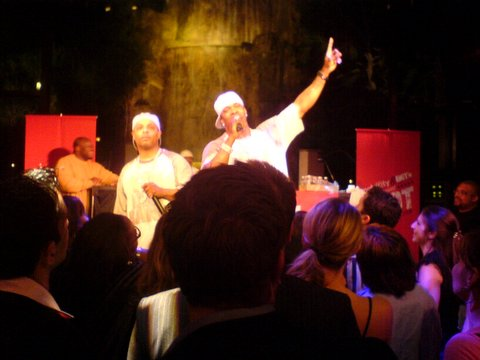
Busta Rhymes performing in 2006

His seventh studio album, titled The Big Bang, became the first No. 1 album of his career. The album sold over 209,000 copies in its first week to earn the top spot on the U.S. Billboard 200.

It was later revealed that Busta signed a deal with Universal Motown, through which he released his eighth studio album, Back on My B.S., on May 19, 2009. Due to controversial content, the United Arab Emirates has banned the album. Back on My B.S. was released internationally, but because of one song, "Arab Money", it cannot be purchased as a CD there, although the album can still be purchased via iTunes. According to the National Media Council, the lyrics were considered to be offensive to Arabs and to Islam because it quoted the Quran.

In November 2008, when "Arab Money" was released as a single, DJ Dany Neville and the Iraqi rapper The Narcicyst responded by recording a reply. Rhymes later apologized. DJs in the country said they had not received an order banning the record from being spun in nightclubs, and they had mixed feelings on whether the record was offensive or not. DJ Saif of Dubai said "I don't play 'Arab Money' because it's disrespectful [to] Arabs. I don't think there is a ban on playing it in clubs, but many here don't play it anyway."

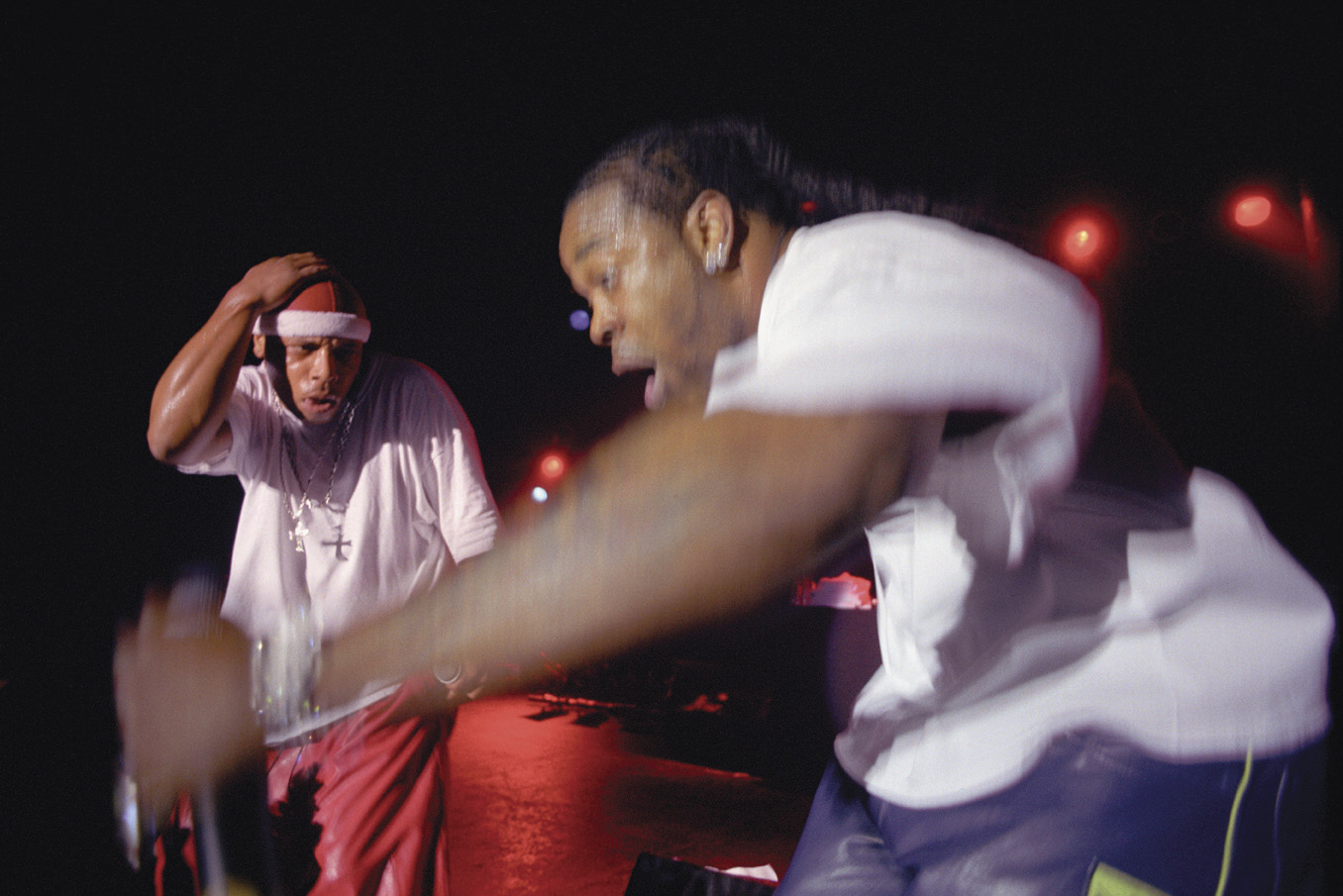
Busta Rhymes in 2002

DJ Bliss, along with many other DJs in the UAE, refused to play "Arab Money" on Radio 1 in Dubai after it was banned in the UAE for offense to Arabs. He added, "I used to play the original version in the club, but out of respect for the laws here in my country, I haven't played it since." In 2010 the track's producer Ron Browz defended Busta Rhymes in a Dubai interview with journalist Awad Mustafa stating that the track was misunderstood. "For us, having 'Arab money' is a compliment understood like having 'Oprah money' or 'Tiger Woods money' – it's just street slang, and we were appreciating the amazing wonders that have been created here," Browz said. Browz added that he had produced the track in a moment of inspiration while experimenting in his studio. "Growing up in Harlem I was always surrounded by Arabs and Muslims, we embraced their culture and they embraced ours and we always joked with each other," he said.

=== 2009–2020: Collaborations and Extinction Level Event 2 ===
In September 2009, Busta Rhymes had announced that he was working on his ninth studio album, alongside Canadian producer Boi-1da, titled The Chemo. At the time, he stated that the project was 80% finished. In May 2010, Busta Rhymes had reportedly changed the title of his ninth album from The Chemo to Extinction Level Event 2, making his ninth effort a sequel to his 1998 album Extinction Level Event (Final World Front).

Busta Rhymes contributed to the 2011 Tech N9ne album All 6's and 7's, performing vocals on the single, "Worldwide Choppers", released on May 31. Canadian recording artist Justin Bieber featured Busta Rhymes on a song called "Drummer Boy" off Bieber's second studio album, Under the Mistletoe, released on November 1, 2011. On November 11, 2011, a Heavy D tribute song titled "You Ain't Gotta Wait Till I'm Gone" was leaked.

On November 16, 2011, it was announced that Busta Rhymes signed to Cash Money Records.

A song with Twista, titled "Can You Keep Up", was leaked. Busta Rhymes was featured on Fat Joe's single "Pride & Joy" alongside Kanye West and Jadakiss. His ninth studio album, Year of the Dragon, was released for free on Google Play on August 21, 2012. The album features guest appearances from Lil Wayne, Rick Ross, Trey Songz, Robin Thicke, Maino, Gucci Mane and more. He also released a music video for the track "Doin' It Again" which features Reek da Villian and includes a tribute to his manager Chris Lighty, who committed suicide in 2012.

He was later featured on YMCMB label mate Shannel's single "Last Time". In 2011, it was announced that Universal Motown was going defunct, forcing Rhymes and other artists to move to Universal Republic Records. In mid-2012, it was announced that Universal Republic Records was also going defunct, forcing artists on the roster to move to Republic Records, reviving the label.

On December 21, 2012, members of The Conglomerate Ent., Busta along with J. Doe and Reek da Villan released a mixtape titled Catastrophic, their first collective effort. Busta Rhymes collaborated with Pharrell Williams, who produced the first single off his Cash Money Records debut, "Twerk It", which was released on June 6, 2013. A video was shot in Flatbush on June 3, 2013. The official remix was released featuring Nicki Minaj. On July 23, 2014, Busta Rhymes announced that he left Cash Money Records due to creative differences and he is no longer on Republic.

He was featured on "Devil", featuring Neon Hitch and B.o.B, a song by Cash Cash. It was released in August 2015. In July 2014, it was announced that Rhymes had amicably departed Cash Money Records due to creative differences.

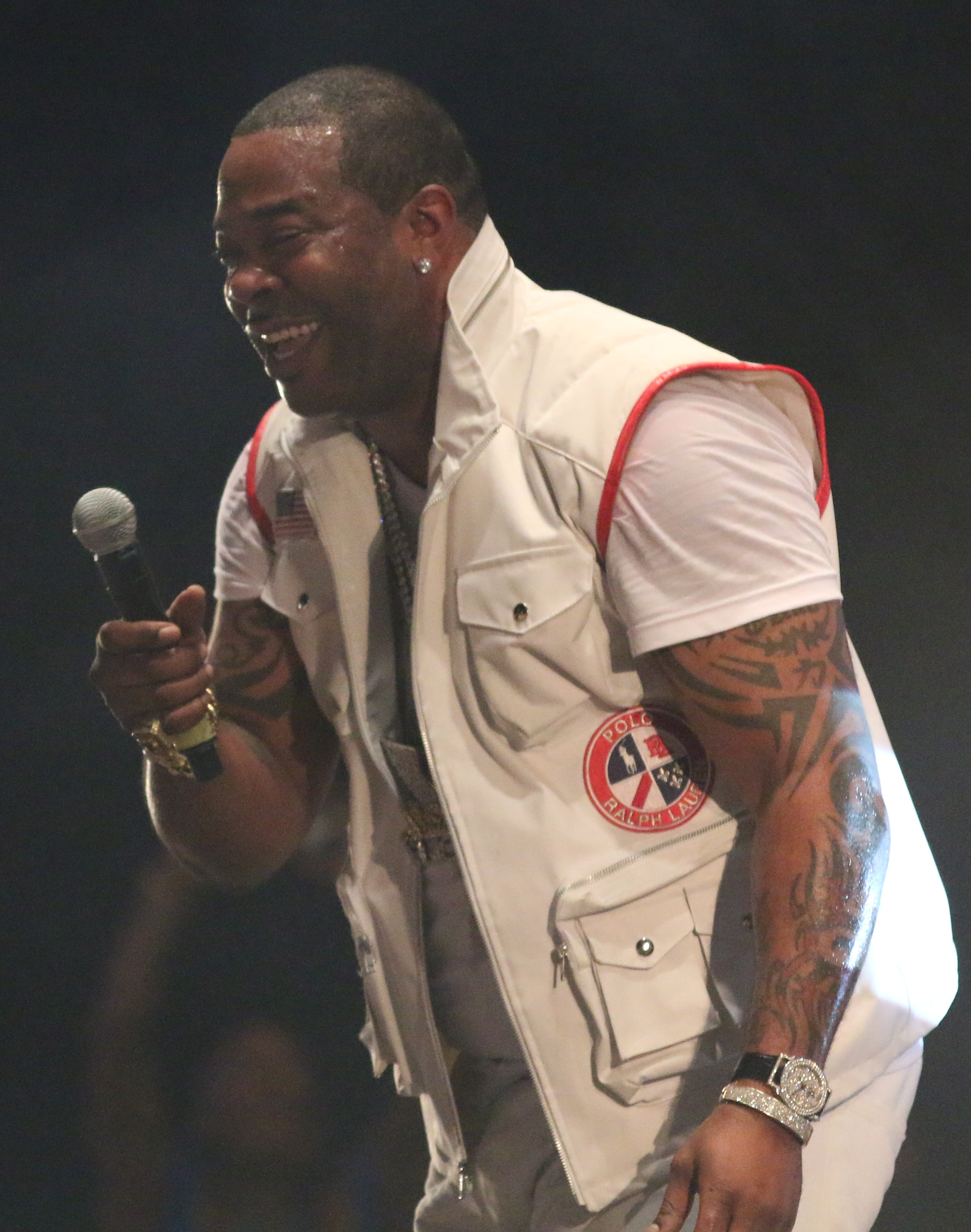
Busta Rhymes at Out4Fame Festival 2015 in Germany

In 2016, a movement to name a small, uninhabited lake island in Shrewsbury, Massachusetts after Busta Rhymes received viral publicity. The unofficial name of Busta Rhymes Island was chosen by a town resident because the island has "rope-swinging, blueberries, and ... stuff Busta would enjoy". A formal proposal was made to the U.S. Board on Geographic Names to officially change the island's name, but it was not accepted due to regulations regarding the naming of geographic places after living people.

Busta Rhymes was also a featured artist on The Hamilton Mixtape, singing a remix of "My Shot", along with Black Thought of The Roots and Joell Ortiz. The trio performed the song on The Tonight Show Starring Jimmy Fallon. On February 2, 2018, Rhymes released a new single "Get It", featuring Missy Elliott and Kelly Rowland, through Epic Records.

In February 2019, Busta Rhymes confirmed he's putting the "finishing touches" of his new album with longtime collaborator, Dr. Dre.

In 2020, Busta Rhymes competed in season 4 of The Masked Singer as "Dragon". He was eliminated in the first episode.

On October 30, 2020, Busta released his album Extinction Level Event 2: The Wrath of God.

=== 2021–2024: Blockbusta and guest appearances ===
In 2021, Busta Rhymes released the 25th Anniversary Edition of his debut studio album, The Coming.

In late 2023, his eleventh studio album, Blockbusta, which has many guest appearances, was released. On December 12, 2023 he performed at the opening ceremony of the FIFA Club World Cup in Jeddah, Saudi Arabia alongside Swedish House Mafia.

Throughout late 2024, he made two major guest appearances on his idol, LL Cool J's "Huey in the Chair", a track from his fourteenth album, The FORCE, the pair's first collaboration in nearly 27 years since 1997's "Starsky and Hutch". That November, he appeared on singer Ciara's single, "Wassup".

=== 2025–present: Dragon Season ===
On January 17, 2025, Busta Rhymes released his EP, Dragon Season... The Awakening, a precursor to his upcoming studio album, Dragon Season.

Busta Rhymes contributed the song "Taking Everything" for the soundtrack of the 2025 animated heist action comedy film The Bad Guys 2, the sequel to the 2022 film The Bad Guys, both loosely based on the book series of the same name by Aaron Blabey. Rhymes co-wrote the song with the film's composer Daniel Pemberton and was released as a promotional single from the soundtrack on July 25, 2025.

Busta Rhymes performed a medley set with Spliff Star, Joyner Lucas, Papoose and GloRilla at the 2025 MTV Video Music Awards in September, which was hosted by LL Cool J, with whom Rhymes has previously collaborated with.

== Personal life ==
Busta Rhymes identifies as a member of the Five-Percent Nation and has been a Muslim since the age of 12. He has six children; three sons (born in 1993, 1999, and 2001) and three daughters (born 1998, 1999, and 2006).

During a 2007 interview for Hip-Hop: Beyond Beats and Rhymes, the rapper walked out when confronted with a question about homophobia in the rap community. Rhymes is quoted as saying: "I can't partake in that conversation", followed by, "With all due respect, I ain't trying to offend nobody. . . What I represent culturally doesn't condone [homosexuality] whatsoever". When asked if the hip-hop culture would ever accept a homosexual rapper, Busta Rhymes then exited the interview.

In a later (2012) interview with MTV News, Rhymes expressed his support for Frank Ocean upon his coming out, as well as general cultural acceptance of homosexuality.

== Legal issues ==
In December 1998, Rhymes was arrested and charged with possession of an unregistered gun after being pulled over during a routine traffic stop in New York City. On October 6, 2000, he received five years' probation after pleading guilty earlier in the year.

On August 20, 2006, Rhymes was arrested and arraigned for charges of third-degree assault after attacking a man who reportedly spat on his car in New York City on August 12 after the AmsterJam Music Festival on Randall's Island.

On October 24, 2006, Rhymes appeared at Manhattan Criminal Court as the district attorney's office attempted to amend previous charges against him to include weapons possession for a machete found in his car. The judge refused to add the charge and adjourned the case.

On February 20, 2007, Rhymes refused a plea deal offered by the prosecutor's office for the assault of his former driver, Edward Hatchett. The deal would have entailed his being in jail for six months and pleading guilty to two assaults, the attack on Hatchett, and the attack on the former fan. The dispute with Hatchett is believed to have originated over back pay Hatchett felt he was owed. Manhattan Criminal Court Judge Becki Rowe offered Busta another option, pleading guilty to third-degree assault. The conditions of the proposed sentence would include five days of community service, two weeks of youth lectures and six months of anger management classes, as well as three years of probation.

On May 3, 2007, Rhymes was arrested in Manhattan for driving without a license and for driving while impaired. On March 18, 2008, a judge in New York City sentenced Rhymes to three years of probation, 10 days community service, $1250 in fines (plus court costs), and to enroll in a drunken driving program.

On September 25, 2008, Rhymes was temporarily refused entry to the UK due to "unresolved convictions".

On January 10, 2025, Rhymes was involved in assaulting one of his assistants, Dashiel Gables, after an argument due to a food delivery dispute near the corner of Jay and Front streets in Brooklyn's Dumbo neighborhood. The victim suffered injuries to his face with visible swelling. Rhymes turned himself in to the police. He was arrested and charged with third degree assault and was issued a desk appearance ticket, which required him to make an appearance in criminal court for an arraignment.

=== Plagiarism lawsuit ===
In 2018, Busta Rhymes was accused of plagiarism by Bernardo Lanzetti and his group Acqua Fragile, who alleged that Rhymes's 2001 song "Genesis" used an uncredited sample of the group's "Cosmic Mind Affair". After negotiations with Rhymes's publishers broke down, Lanzetti and Acqua Fragile opted to move forward with a lawsuit.

== Influences ==
Busta Rhymes's favorite rapper as a teenager was LL Cool J, who inspired him to write his first raps.

He was creatively inspired by American singer and record-producer George Clinton for "being over the top and outlandish and brave as far as his showmanship". Rhymes has also stated that he was taught by Clinton about the music industry and numerous challenges people in it have to face.

== Legacy ==
Rhymes's work has influenced artists such as Eminem, Talib Kweli, Ski Mask the Slump God, Kendrick Lamar, Tyler, the Creator, Doja Cat, and Ciara. Fellow American rapper Big Daddy Kane has stated that Rhymes has the best flow in hip-hop, alluding to the original version of "Turn It Up".

About.com included him on its list of the 50 Greatest MCs of our Time (1987–2007), and Steve Huey of AllMusic called him one of the best and most prolific rappers of the 1990s. In 2012, The Source placed him on its list of the Top 50 Lyricists of all Time. MTV has called him "one of hip-hop's greatest visual artists".

== Discography ==
Studio albums

- The Coming (1996)
- When Disaster Strikes... (1997)
- Extinction Level Event: The Final World Front (1998)
- Anarchy (2000)
- Genesis (2001)
- It Ain't Safe No More... (2002)
- The Big Bang (2006)
- Back on My B.S. (2009)
- Year of the Dragon (2012)
- Extinction Level Event 2: The Wrath of God (2020)
- Blockbusta (2023)

Collaborative albums

- A Future Without a Past... (1991) (as part of the Leaders of the New School)
- T.I.M.E. (The Inner Mind's Eye) (1993) (as part of the Leaders of the New School)
- The Imperial (1998) (as part of the Flipmode Squad)
- Dillagence II (2026) (with J Dilla)

== Filmography ==
=== Film ===
Key
†	Denotes films that have not yet been released

Year	Title	Role	Notes
1993	Who's the Man?	Jawaan	
1993	Strapped	Buster	TV movie
1995	Higher Learning	"Dreads"	
1998	The Rugrats Movie	Reptar Wagon (voice)	
2000	Shaft	Rasaan	
2000	Finding Forrester	Terrell Wallace	
2002	Narc	Darnell "Big D Love" Beery	
2002	Halloween: Resurrection	Freddie Harris	
2004	Full Clip	Joshua Pope	
2009	Breaking Point	Al Bowen	
2011	The Unforgiven	"Lick" Wilson	
2015	Club Life	Himself	
2016	King of the Dancehall	Allestar "All Star Toasta"	
2024	Piece by Piece	Himself (voice)	
2025	The Naked Gun	Bank Robber	
2026	Misty Green	Himself	
2026	Conspiracy of Thieves †	Winston	

=== Television ===
Year	Title	Role	Notes
1991	In Living Color	Himself/Musical Guest	Episode: "Green Eggs and the Guvment Cheese"
1996	New York Undercover	Himself	Episode: "Kill the Noise"
1996–97	Soul Train	Himself	Episode: "Episode 25.26" & "27.9"
1997	Cosby	Phillip	Episode: "Dating Games"
1998	The Wayans Bros.	Himself	Episode: "Busta Saves the Day"
1998	The Steve Harvey Show	Zack	Episode: "Everybody Loves Regina"
1998–2002	Top of the Pops	Himself	Episode: "Episode 35.16" & "39.22"
1999	All That	Himself	Episode: "All That Live! (100th Episode)"
1999	Soul Train Lady of Soul Awards	Himself/Co-Host	Main Co-Host
1999	Mad TV	Himself	Episode: "Episode 5.2"
1999	Rugrats	Reptar Wagon (voice)	Episode: "Wrestling Grandpa/Chuckie Collects"
2000	Making the Video	Himself	Episode: "Busta Rhymes: Fire"
2000–01	Source Hip-Hop Music Awards	Himself/Co-Host	Main Co-Host
2000–02	Showtime at the Apollo	Himself	Episode: "Episode 13.20" & "15.14"
2001	Space Ghost Coast to Coast	Himself	Episode: "Flipmode"
2002	WWE SmackDown	Himself	Episode: "The Undertake & John Cena vs. Kurt Angle & Chris Jericho"
2003	Players	Himself	Episode: "Daredevilin'"
2003	Chappelle's Show	Himself/Musical Guest	Episode: "Reparations & NY Boobs"
2003	Punk'd	Himself	Episode: "Episode 1.8"
2003	Interscope Presents 'The Next Episode'	Himself	Episode: "Detroit"
2004	And You Don't Stop: 30 Years of Hip-Hop	Himself	Episode: "Back in the Day"
2005	Unique Whips	Himself	Episode: "Lincolns, Strippers and Bentleys, Oh My"
2005	Access Granted	Himself	Episode: "Busta Rhymes: Touch It"
2007–08	The Boondocks	Flonominal (voice)	Recurring Cast: Season 2
2015	Master of None	Himself	Episode: "Indians on TV"
2016	Fresh Off the Boat	Himself	Episode: "Hi, My Name Is ..."
2018	Big City Greens	Fish (voice)	Episode: "Fill Bill"
2020	The Masked Singer	Dragon	Eliminated in first episode
2020	The Tonight Show Starring Jimmy Fallon	Himself	Season 8, episode 1339
2024	Everybody Still Hates Chris	Graffiti "Orbit" (voice)	

=== Video games ===
Year	Title	Role	Notes
2004	Def Jam Fight For NY	Magic	Voice role and likeness
2006	Def Jam Fight for NY: The Takeover	Magic	Voice role and likeness
2009	Grand Theft Auto IV: The Ballad Of Gay Tony	Himself	Voice only

=== Documentary ===
Year	Title
1997	Rhyme & Reason
2000	Backstage
2001	Xzibit: Restless Xposed
2002	Slip N'Slide: All Star Weekend
2003	Hip Hop Uncensored Vol. 1: Network Stars
2003	Superhuman
2003	Fromage 2003
2004	Strong Arm Steady
2004	DJ Domination: World Domination
2005	The Game: Documentary
2006	Hip-Hop: Beyond Beats & Rhymes
2006	Pimpalation: Return of the Trill
2006	Lockdown, USA
2006	Jim Jones: A Day in the Fast Life
2006	Rap Sheet: Hip-Hop and the Cops
2007	Public Enemy: Where There's Smoke
2008	Orange Rockcorps at the Royal Albert Hall
2010	SOS Saving OurSelves: Help for Haiti
2011	Beats, Rhymes & Life: The Travels of A Tribe Called Quest
2013	Generation Iron
2014	Nas: Time Is Illmatic
2015	Stretch and Bobbito: Radio that changed Lives
2017	Can't Stop, Won't Stop: A Bad Boy Story
2018	Survivors Guide To Prison
2023	Another West Side Story

== See also ==
- List of artists who reached number one on the U.S. dance chart
- List of number-one U.S. dance hits
- List of songs recorded by Busta Rhymes
- Busta Rhymes Island
