= De La Soul discography =

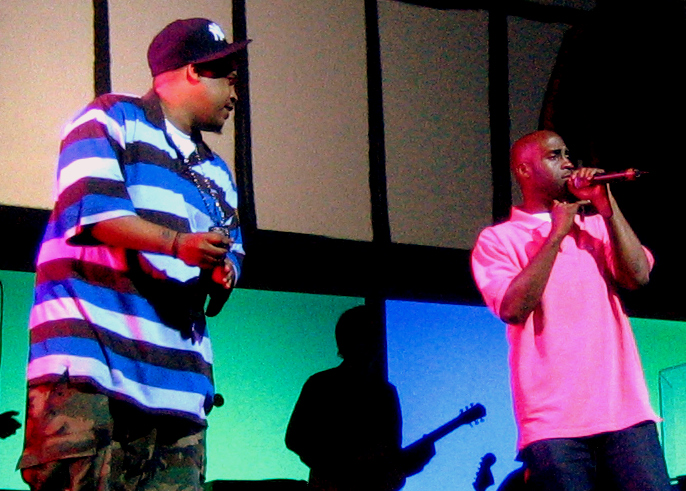
- Trugoy (left) and Posdnuos (right)
- Studio albums: 9
- Extended plays: 3
- Live albums: 1
- Compilation albums: 4
- Singles: 26

This article is a detailed listing of releases by the hip hop group De La Soul. They have one platinum and two gold records, and one Grammy Award. The group have sold over 5 million albums in the US.

== Albums ==
=== Studio albums ===
List of studio albums, with selected chart positions and certifications
| Title | Album details | Peak chart positions | | | | | | | | | | Sales | Certifications |
| Title | Album details | US | US R&B | AUS | EUR | FRA | GER | NED | NZ | SWI | UK | Sales | Certifications |
|---|---|---|---|---|---|---|---|---|---|---|---|---|---|
| 3 Feet High and Rising | Released: February 6, 1989; Label: Tommy Boy (#TB1019); Formats: CD, LP, cassette, digital download, streaming | 15 | 1 | 129 | 40 | — | 22 | 20 | 13 | 80 | 9 | | RIAA: Platinum; BPI: Platinum |
| De La Soul Is Dead | Released: May 14, 1991; Label: Tommy Boy (#TB1029); Formats: CD, LP, cassette, digital download, streaming | 26 | 24 | 12 | 18 | — | 12 | 20 | 6 | 17 | 7 | FRA: 50,000 | RIAA: Gold |
| Buhloone Mindstate | Released: September 21, 1993; Label: Tommy Boy (#TB1063); Formats: CD, LP, cassette, digital download, streaming | 40 | 9 | 120 | — | — | — | — | 40 | — | 37 | | |
| Stakes Is High | Released: July 2, 1996; Label: Tommy Boy (#TB1149); Formats: CD, LP, cassette, digital download, streaming | 13 | 4 | 105 | — | — | 91 | 68 | 45 | — | 42 | | |
| Art Official Intelligence: Mosaic Thump | Released: August 8, 2000; Label: Tommy Boy (#TB1436); Formats: CD, LP, cassette, digital download, streaming | 9 | 3 | 32 | 23 | 26 | 16 | 25 | — | 25 | 22 | US: 81,000 (First week sales) | BPI: Silver |
| AOI: Bionix | Released: December 4, 2001; Label: Tommy Boy (#TB1362); Formats: CD, LP, cassette, digital download, streaming | 136 | 31 | 105 | — | 119 | — | — | — | 60 | 162 | | |
| The Grind Date | Released: October 5, 2004; Label: Sanctuary (#06076-87512); Formats: CD, LP, digital download, streaming | 87 | 17 | — | — | 148 | — | — | — | 89 | 181 | | |
| And the Anonymous Nobody... | Released: August 26, 2016; Label: AOI Records (#AOI001); Formats: CD, LP, digital download, streaming | 12 | 3 | 25 | — | 42 | 22 | 19 | 31 | 12 | 16 | US: 23,000 (First week sales) | |
| Cabin in the Sky | Released: November 21, 2025; Label: Mass Appeal Records; Formats: CD, LP, digital download, streaming | — | — | — | — | — | 30 | — | — | 31 | — | | |
"—" denotes items that did not chart or were not released in that territory.

=== Live albums ===
| Title | Album details | Notes |
|---|---|---|
| Live at Tramps, NYC, 1996 | Released: May 15, 2004; Label: Rhino (#8122-78201); Formats: CD | Recorded in New York in 1996; Guest appearances from: Jungle Brothers, Common, and Mos Def |

=== Compilation albums ===
| Title | Album details | Peak chart positions | | | | | | | Certifications |
| Title | Album details | AUS | EUR | IRE | NZ | SCO | UK | UK R&B | Certifications |
|---|---|---|---|---|---|---|---|---|---|
| Remixes | Released: 1991; Label: Sony (#SRCS 5633); Formats: CD | — | — | — | — | — | — | — | |
| De La Remix | Released: 1992; Label: Tommy Boy (#TB3783); Formats: LP, CD | — | — | — | — | — | — | — | |
| Timeless: The Singles Collection | Released: May 27, 2003; Label: Rhino (#R2 73860); Formats: CD | 69 | — | — | 40 | — | — | — | |
| The Best of De La Soul | Released: June 9, 2003; Label: Rhino (#R2 73664); Formats: LP, CD, download | — | 70 | 56 | — | 28 | 17 | 3 | BPI: Gold |
| De La Mix Tape: Remixes, Rarities and Classics | Released: June 8, 2004; Label: Rhino (#R2 78202); Formats: LP, CD | — | — | — | — | — | — | — | |
| The Impossible: Mission TV Series – Pt. 1 | Released: October 20, 2006; Label: AOI Records (#DLS-MX001.IM); Formats: LP, CD | — | — | — | — | — | — | — | |
"—" denotes items that did not chart or were not released in that territory.

== Mixtapes ==
| Year | Mixtape details |
|---|---|
| 2009 | Are You In?: Nike+ Original Run: Released: April 28, 2009; Label: Nike, Inc.; Formats: Digital download |
| 2014 | Smell the Da.I.S.Y.: Released: March 26, 2014; Formats: Digital download |

== Extended plays ==
- Clear Lake Audiotorium (1994)
- For Your Pain & Suffering (2016)

== Singles ==
=== As lead artist ===
List of singles, with selected chart positions and certifications, showing year released and album name
| Title | Year | Peak chart positions | | | | | | | | | | Certifications | Album |
| Title | Year | US | US Dance | US R&B | US Rap | AUS | GER | NED | NZ | SWI | UK | Certifications | Album |
|---|---|---|---|---|---|---|---|---|---|---|---|---|---|
| "Plug Tunin'" / "Freedom of Speak" | 1988 | — | — | — | — | — | — | — | — | — | — | | 3 Feet High and Rising |
| "Jenifa (Taught Me)" / "Potholes in My Lawn" | 1988 | — | — | — | 22 | — | — | — | — | — | — | | 3 Feet High and Rising |
| "Me Myself and I" | 1989 | 34 | 1 | 1 | 1 | — | 16 | 1 | — | 22 | 22 | RIAA: Gold | 3 Feet High and Rising |
| "Say No Go" | 1989 | — | 3 | 32 | 11 | 143 | — | 7 | 11 | — | 18 | | 3 Feet High and Rising |
| "Eye Know" | 1989 | — | — | — | — | 78 | — | 17 | 17 | 28 | 14 | | 3 Feet High and Rising |
| "The Magic Number" / "Buddy" | 1989 | — | — | — | — | — | — | 39 | — | — | 7 | | 3 Feet High and Rising |
| "Ring Ring Ring (Ha Ha Hey)" | 1991 | — | 16 | 22 | 3 | 4 | 8 | 2 | 5 | 1 | 10 | ARIA: Gold; RMNZ: Gold | De La Soul Is Dead |
| "A Roller Skating Jam Named "Saturdays"" | 1991 | — | 6 | 43 | — | 54 | 37 | 22 | 4 | 17 | 22 | | De La Soul Is Dead |
| "Millie Pulled a Pistol on Santa" / "Keepin' the Faith" | 1991 | — | — | — | — | — | — | — | — | — | — | | De La Soul Is Dead |
| "Breakadawn" | 1993 | 76 | — (Note: "Breakadawn" did not enter the Dance Club Songs, but peaked at number one on the Dance Singles Sales chart.) | 30 | 16 | 73 | — | — | 15 | — | 39 | | Buhloone Mindstate |
| "Ego Trippin' (Part Two)" | 1994 | — | — (Note: "Ego Trippin' (Part Two)" did not enter the Dance Club Songs, but peaked at number 47 on the Dance Singles Sales chart.) | 74 | 39 | — | — | — | — | — | — | | Buhloone Mindstate |
| "Fallin'" (with Teenage Fanclub) | 1994 | — | — | — | — | — | — | — | 12 | — | 59 | | Judgment Night Soundtrack |
| "Stakes Is High" | 1996 | — | — (Note: "Stakes Is High" did not enter the Dance Club Songs, but peaked at number 3 on the Dance Singles Sales chart.) | 53 | 19 | 117 | — | — | 27 | — | 55 | | Stakes Is High |
| "Itzsoweezee (Hot)" | 1996 | — (Note: "Itzsoweezee (Hot)" did not enter the Billboard Hot 100, but peaked at number 13 on the Bubbling Under Hot 100.) | — (Note: "Itzsoweezee (Hot)" did not enter the Dance Club Songs, but peaked at number 10 on the Dance Singles Sales chart.) | 60 | 17 | — | — | — | — | — | — | | Stakes Is High |
| "4 More" (featuring Zhané) | 1997 | — | — | — | — | — | — | — | — | — | 52 | | Stakes Is High |
| "F.U.N.K.Y. Towel" | 1997 | — | — | — | — | — | — | — | — | — | — | | Joe's Apartment |
| "Stay Away" (featuring Pete Rock and Rob-O) | 1998 | — | — | — | — | — | — | — | — | — | — | | Non-album single |
| "Oooh." (featuring Redman) | 2000 | — (Note: "Oooh." did not enter the Billboard Hot 100, but peaked at number 25 on the Bubbling Under Hot 100.) | — | 44 | 14 | 91 | 52 | 48 | — | 94 | 29 | | Art Official Intelligence: Mosaic Thump |
| "All Good?" (featuring Chaka Khan) | 2000 | 96 | 17 | 41 | 6 | 34 | 76 | 76 | — | 64 | 33 | | Art Official Intelligence: Mosaic Thump |
| "Thru Ya City" (featuring DV Alias Khirst) | 2000 | — | — | — | — | — | — | — | — | — | 90 | | Art Official Intelligence: Mosaic Thump |
| "Baby Phat" (featuring Yummy Bingham) | 2001 | — | — | 81 | — | — | — | — | — | — | 55 | | AOI: Bionix |
| "Say 'I Gotta Believe!'" (with PaRappa featuring Double) | 2002 | — | — | — | — | — | — | — | — | — | — | | PaRappa the Rapper 2 Soundtrack |
| "Shoomp" / "Much More" (featuring Sean Paul and Yummy Bingham) | 2003 | — | — | — (Note: "Shoomp" did not enter the Hot R&B/Hip-Hop Songs chart, but peaked at number 43 on the Hot R&B/Hip-Hop Singles Sales chart.) | — | — | — | — | — | — | 85 | | The Grind Date |
| "Shopping Bags (She Got from You)' | 2004 | — | — | — | — | — | — | — | — | — | 80 | | The Grind Date |
| "Rock Co.Kane Flow" (featuring MF Doom) | 2004 | — | — | — | — | — | — | — | — | — | 167 | | The Grind Date |
| "Respect" | 2006 | — | — | — | — | — | — | — | — | — | — | | The Impossible: Mission TV Series – Pt. 1 |
| "Forever" | 2009 | — | — | — | — | — | — | — | — | — | — | | Are You In?: Nike+ Original Run |
| "The Return of DST" | 2010 | — | — | — | — | — | — | — | — | — | — | | Non-album singles |
| "Get Away" (with The Spirit of the Wu) | 2013 | — | — | — | — | — | — | — | — | — | — | | Non-album singles |
| "The People" (with Chuck D) | 2014 | — | — | — | — | — | — | — | — | — | — | | Non-album singles |
| "God It" (with Nas) | 2015 | — | — | — | — | — | — | — | — | — | — | | Non-album singles |
| "Action!"(with Angry Birds) | 2016 | — | — | — | — | — | — | — | — | — | — | | Non-album singles |
| "Trainwreck" | 2016 | — | — | — | — | — | — | — | — | — | — | | And the Anonymous Nobody... |
| "Pain" (featuring Snoop Dogg) | 2016 | — | — | — | — | — | — | — | — | — | — | | And the Anonymous Nobody... |
| "Royalty Capes" | 2016 | — | — | — | — | — | — | — | — | — | — | | And the Anonymous Nobody... |
| "Drawn" (featuring Little Dragon) | 2016 | — | — | — | — | — | — | — | — | — | — | | And the Anonymous Nobody... |
| "Greyhounds" (featuring Usher) | 2016 | — | — | — | — | — | — | — | — | — | — | | And the Anonymous Nobody... |
| "Remove 45" (featuring Styles P, Talib Kweli, Pharoah Monch, Mysonne & Chuck D) | 2020 | — | — | — | — | — | — | — | — | — | — | | Non-album single |
| "The Package" | 2025 | — | — | — | — | — | — | — | — | — | — | | Cabin in the Sky |
| "Day in the Sun (Gettin' wit U)" (featuring Q-Tip, and Yummy Bingham) | 2025 | — | — | — | — | — | — | — | — | — | — | | Cabin in the Sky |
"—" denotes items that did not chart or were not released in that territory.

=== As featured artist ===
| Year | Title | Peak chart positions | | | | | | | | | | Certifications | Album |
| Year | Title | US | AUS | EUR | GER | IRE | NED | NZ | SCO | SWI | UK | Certifications | Album |
|---|---|---|---|---|---|---|---|---|---|---|---|---|---|
| 1990 | "Doin' Our Own Dang" (Jungle Brothers featuring De La Soul, Q-Tip, Queen Latifah and Monie Love) | — | — | — | — | — | — | — | — | — | — | — | Done by the Forces of Nature |
| 1990 | "Mama Gave Birth to the Soul Children" (Queen Latifah featuring De La Soul) | — | — | 37 | — | — | — | — | — | — | 14 | | All Hail the Queen |
| 2005 | "Feel Good Inc." (Gorillaz featuring De La Soul) | 14 | 3 | 2 | 8 | 4 | 87 | 2 | 60 | 12 | 2 | BPI: 5× Platinum; ARIA: Platinum; FIMI: Platinum; RIAA: Gold; RMNZ: Gold | Demon Days |
| 2010 | "Superfast Jellyfish" (Gorillaz featuring Gruff Rhys and De La Soul) | — | — | — | — | — | — | — | — | — | — | | Plastic Beach |
| 2018 | "It Runs Through Me" (Tom Misch featuring De La Soul) | — | — | — | — | — | — | — | — | — | — | BPI: Silver | Geography |
| 2019 | "Rocket Fuel" (DJ Shadow featuring De La Soul) | — | — | — | — | — | — | — | — | — | — | | Our Pathetic Age |
"—" denotes items that did not chart or were not released in that territory.

== Music videos ==
| Year | Title | Director |
|---|---|---|
| 1988 | "Potholes in My Lawn" | n/a |
| 1989 | "Me Myself and I" | Charles Stone III |
| 1989 | "Eye Know" | ? |
| 1989 | "Say No Go" | Mark Pellington |
| 1989 | "Buddy (Native Tongue Decision)" | ? |
| 1989 | "Doin' Our Own Dang" (Jungle Brothers featuring De La Soul, Q-Tip, Monie Love and Queen Latifah) | ? |
| 1991 | "A Roller Skating Jam Named 'Saturdays'" (featuring Q-Tip) | Benjamin Stokes |
| 1991 | "Ring Ring Ring (Ha Ha Hey)" | Mark Romanek |
| 1991 | "Keepin' the Faith (Straight Path Mix)" [featuring Vinia Mojica] | ? |
| 1993 | "Breakadawn" | Mark Gerard |
| 1993 | "Ego Trippin' (Part Two)" | Frank Sacramento |
| 1994 | Fallin' (with Teenage Fanclub) | Josh Taft |
| 1996 | "Stakes Is High" | Kennedy |
| 1996 | "Itzsoweezee (HOT)" | Marcus Turner |
| 1997 | "How Ya Want It We Got It (Native Tongues Remix)" (Jungle Brothers featuring De La Soul and Q-Tip) | ? |
| 1997 | "F.U.N.K.Y. Towel" | ? |
| 2000 | "Oooh." (featuring Redman) | Jeff Richter |
| 2000 | "All Good?" (featuring Chaka Khan) | David Nelson |
| 2000 | "One Four Love- Pt. 1" (Talib Kweli, Kool G Rap, Rah Digga, Sporty Thieves, Mos Def, Shabam Shaddeq, Common, Talib Kweli, Pharoahe Monche, Posdnuos) | ? |
| 2001 | "Baby Phat" (featuring Devin and Yummy) | Darren Grant |
| 2002 | "Say 'I Gotta Believe!' (PaRappa featuring De La Soul and Double) | Fish from the Fishbowl |
| 2004 | "Shopping Bags (She Got from You)" | Lenny Bass |
| 2005 | "Feel Good Inc." (Gorillaz featuring De La Soul | Pete Candeland |
| 2010 | "Superfast Jellyfish" (Gorillaz featuring De La Soul) | ? |
| 2011 | "Show Me" (Mint Royal featuring Posdnuos) | |
| 2012 | "Must B the Music" | Matt Stawski |
| 2013 | "Get Away" | Lenny Bass, Kris Mercado |
| 2016 | "Memory of (US)" [featuring Pete Rock and Estelle] | ? |
| 2016 | "Pain" | ? |
| 2017 | "Drawn" (featuring Little Dragon) | J Anders Urmacher |
| 2017 | "Royalty Capes" | J Anders Urmacher |
| 2017 | "Whoodeeni" (featuring 2 Chainz) | ? |
| 2018 | "It Runs Through Me" (Tom Misch featuring De La Soul) | Joshua Osbourne |
| 2019 | "Rocket Fuel" (DJ Shadow featuring De La Soul) | ? |
| 2022 | "Fatherhood" (Wildchild featuring Big Daddy Kane, Stacy Epps & Posdnuos) | ? |
| 2023 | "Flying High" (Diamond D featuring Posdnuos) | ? |
| 2024 | "When the Sun Shines Again" (Common & Pete Rock featuring Bilal and Posdnuos) | ? |

== Guest appearances ==
- 1992: "Let the Horns Blow" (featuring Trugoy the Dove, Fashion, Dres, Phife Dawg) (from Chi-Ali album The Fabulous Chi-Ali)
- 1996: "I Can't Call It" (from High School High (soundtrack))
- ~~~~: "The Hustle" (from America Is Dying Slowly)
- ~~~~: "How Ya Want It We Got It (Native Tongues Remix)" [from Jungle Brothers album Raw Deluxe]
- 1997: "B-Side to Hollywood" (featuring Dave) (from Camp Lo album Uptown Saturday Night)
- ~~~~: "Chanel No. Fever" (from Men in Black: The Album)
- ~~~~: "Gettin' Down at the Amphitheater" (from Common album One Day It'll All Make Sense)
- ~~~~: "Trouble in the Water" (from DJ Honda album HII)
- 1998: "Intro" (from Lyricist Lounge, Volume One)
- ~~~~: "360° (Oh Yeah)" (from Propellerheads album Decksandrumsandrockandroll)
- ~~~~: "Hey DJ" (from Malcolm McLaren album Buffalo Gals Back to Skool)
- 1999: "More Than You Know" (from Prince Paul album A Prince Among Thieves)
- ~~~~: "Voicetress" (from Truth Enola album 6 O'Clock Straight)
- ~~~~: "Star Track" (from Alliance Ethnik album Fat Come Back)
- ~~~~: "The Projects (P Jays)" [featuring Del & Dave] (from Handsome Boy Modeling School album So... How's Your Girl?)
- ~~~~: "Victim" (Tetsuya Komuro Remix) (from True Kiss Destination album Over & Over)
- 2000: "Keep On (86 Init Mix)" (from Nightmares on Wax promo Sound of N.O.W.)
- ~~~~: "So Good" (with Camp Lo) (from Tommy Boy Black Label Hip Hop 101)
- ~~~~: "Cali to New York" (from The Black Eyed Peas album Bridging the Gap)
- ~~~~: "What's That (Que eso?)" (with Mos Def) (from Tony Touch album The Piece Maker)
- ~~~~: "Soul Rebels" (from Reflection Eternal album Train of Thought)
- 2001: "Time for the True" (featuring D.V. Alias Khryst) (from Adam F. album Kaos)
- ~~~~: "Tea Time With Maseo" (from Lovage album Music to Make Love to Your Old Lady By)
- ~~~~: "Turn It Out" (featuring Elizabeth "Yummy" Bingham) (from Osmosis Jones (soundtrack)
- ~~~~: "Alayna" (from LFO album Life Is Good)
- 2003: "Cobbs Creek (Great Skate Remix" (from King Britt album Adventures in Lo-Fi)
- ~~~~: "Clear Day" (featuring Masta Ace & Dave) (from The Last Emperor album Hidden Treasures)
- 2004: "If It Wasn't for You" (featuring Starchild Excalibur) (from Handsome Boy Modeling School's album White People )
- ~~~~: "She Wants to Move" (Native Tongues Remix) (from N.E.R.D. single)
- ~~~~: "It's a New Thing (It's Your Thing)" [D-Nat & Onda Remix] (from The Isley Brothers album Taken to the Next Phase)
- 2005: "Yo" (from Boss AC's album Ritmo, Amor e Palavras)
- 2006: "So Cool" (from DJ Muro soundtrack to Tokyo Tribe 2
- ~~~~: "The Idea" (from Ty album Closer)
- 2009: "Daylight (Troublemaker Remix)" (from FIFA 10 soundtrack/Daylight single by Matt and Kim)
- ~~~~: "Rewind DJ" (Eslam Jawaad from his debut album The Mammoth Tusk)
- 2011: "Picnic" (from Cradle Orchestra album Transcended Elements)
- 2012: "Turnin' Me Off" (from Slum Village album Dirty Slums)
- 2014: "Seal Me with a Kiss" (from Jessie J album Sweet Talker)
- ~~~~: "Navajo Rugs" (from Stalley album Ohio)
- 2015: "WTF" (from Étienne de Crécy album Super Discount 3)
- 2016: "Time for the Summer" (from Jazzy Jeff mixtape Summertime: The Mixtape Vol. 7)
- 2017: "Momentz" (from Gorillaz album Humanz)
- ~~~~: "Heart Attack" (from Oliver album Full Circle
- ~~~~: "Leap of Faith" (from Mr Jukes album God First)
- 2021: "Mr. Big Mouf pt. II" (from Khrysis album The Hour of Khrysis)
- 2023: "Crocadillaz" (from Gorillaz album Cracker Island)
- 2024: "My Year" (from Da Beatminerz album Stifled Creativity)
