= The Best of De La Soul =

2003 compilation album by De La Soul

Greatest hits album by De La Soul
- Released: June 9, 2003
- Genre: Alternative hip hop
- Length: 70:53
- Labels: Tommy Boy; Warner Bros.

De La Soul chronology
| AOI: Bionix (2001) | The Best of De La Soul (2003) | Live at Tramps, NYC, 1996 (2004) |

Professional ratings
Review scores
| Source | Rating |
|---|---|
| AllMusic | 3.5/5 stars |

The Best of De La Soul is a compilation album by American hip hop group De La Soul, released in June 2003 through Tommy Boy and Warner Bros. Records. It compiles their biggest hits over the years. It reached the top 20 on the UK Albums Chart and was certified gold by the British Phonographic Industry (BPI).

== Track listing ==
=== Standard edition CD1 ===
1. "Me Myself and I" – 3:45
2. "Say No Go" – 4:22
3. "Eye Know" – 4:13
4. "The Magic Number" – 3:16
5. "Potholes in My Lawn" – 3:50
6. "Buddy" (featuring Jungle Brothers and Q-Tip) – 4:55
7. "Ring Ring Ring (Ha Ha Hey)" – 4:07
8. "A Roller Skating Jam Named "Saturdays"" (featuring Q-Tip and Vinia Mojica) – 4:02
9. "Keepin' the Faith" – 4:45
10. "Breakadawn" – 4:16
11. "Stakes Is High" – 5:31
12. "4 More" (featuring Zhane) – 4:19
13. "Oooh." (featuring Redman) – 3:35
14. "All Good?" (featuring Chaka Khan) – 5:00
15. "Thru Ya City" (featuring D.V. Alias Khrist) – 3:29
16. "Baby Phat" (featuring Devin the Dude and Yummy Bingham) – 3:51
17. "Watch Out" – 3:37

=== Limited edition CD2 ===
1. "Buddy" (Native Tongue Decision Version; featuring Jungle Brothers, Q-Tip, and Phife) – 7:16
2. "Stakes Is High" (remix; featuring Mos Def and Truth Enola) – 4:49
3. "Bizness" (featuring Common) – 5:43
4. "Stone Age" (featuring Biz Markie) – 4:12
5. "Big Brother Beat" (featuring Mos Def) – 3:43
6. "4 More" (clean version; featuring Zhane) – 4:20
7. "So Good" (featuring Camp Lo) – 4:27
8. "I.C. Y'All" (featuring Busta Rhymes) – 3:23
9. "Held Down" (featuring Cee-Lo Green) – 4:55
10. "What We Do (For Love)" (featuring Slick Rick) – 5:06

== Charts and certifications ==
=== Weekly charts ===
Weekly chart performance for The Best of De La Soul
| Chart (2003) | Peak position |
|---|---|
| European Albums (European Top 100 Albums) | 70 |
| Irish Albums (IRMA) | 56 |
| Scottish Albums (Official Charts) | 28 |
| UK Albums (Official Charts) | 17 |
| UK R&B Albums (Official Charts) | 3 |

=== Certifications ===
Certifications for The Best of De La Soul
| Region | Certification | Certified units/sales |
|---|---|---|
| United Kingdom (BPI) | Gold | 100,000^{^} |
^{^} Shipments figures based on certification alone.
