= Say No Go =

Single by De La Soul

from the album 3 Feet High and Rising
- Released: August 24, 1989
- Recorded: 1988
- Genre: Alternative hip hop; golden age hip hop
- Length: 4:21
- Label: Tommy Boy
- Songwriters: Paul Huston; David Jude Jolicoeur; Vincent Mason; Kelvin Mercer
- Producers: Prince Paul, De La Soul

De La Soul singles chronology
"Me Myself and I" (1989)	"Say No Go" (1989)	"The Magic Number" (1990)

"Say No Go" is a single by De La Soul from their influential 1989 album 3 Feet High and Rising. It reached number 18 in the UK charts. The tune is heavily based on the Hall & Oates song "I Can't Go for That (No Can Do)".

== Background ==
During the 1980s and 1990s, the United States faced a severe crack cocaine epidemic. This crisis particularly impacted Black urban communities, leading to increased rates of addiction, violence, and incarceration. In this context, The song is a cautionary tale about the use of drugs, in particular "base" (otherwise known as crack cocaine); a topic they would tackle on their follow-up album, De La Soul Is Dead, albeit from a different perspective, on the song "My Brother's a Basehead".

In the opening line, Posdnuos raps: "Now let's get right on down to the skit / A baby is brought into a world of pits / And if it could've talked that soon / In the delivery room / It would've asked the nurse for a hit".

== Track listing ==
1. "Say No Go (Say No Dope Mix)" - 6:15
2. "Say No Go (New Keys Vocal)" - 4:51
3. "Say No Go (Radio Mix)" - 4:21
4. "The Mack Daddy on the Left" - 2:33
  - Guest Appearance: Chi Ali
5. "Say No Go (New Keys Instrumental)" - 5:01

Samples

"Say No Go" includes samples from the following songs:

- Hall & Oates: "I Can't Go for That (No Can Do)"
- Sly Stone: "Crossword Puzzle"
- The Detroit Emeralds: "Baby Let Me Take You (In My Arms)"
- Emotions: "Best of My Love"
- Funky 4 + 1: "That's The Joint"
- The Turtles: "I'm Chief Kamanawanalea (We're the Royal Macadamia Nuts)"
- Walter Schumann: "Dragnet (theme music)"

== Charts ==
Chart (1989)	Peak Position
Australia (ARIA)	143
Netherlands (Dutch Top 40)	8
Netherlands (Single Top 100)	7
UK Singles (OCC)	18
U.S. Billboard Hot Black Singles	32
U.S. Billboard Hot Dance Club Play	3
U.S. Billboard Hot Rap Singles	11
U.S. Billboard Hot Dance Music/Maxi-Singles Sales	13

=== Yearly charts ===
Year-end chart performance for "Say No Go"
Chart (1989)	Position
Netherlands (Dutch Top 40)	82
Netherlands (Single Top 100)	63

== See also ==
- Just Say No
