= Live at Tramps, NYC, 1996 =

2004 album by De La Soul

Live album by De La Soul
- Released: May 15, 2004
- Recorded: May 16, 1996
- Genre: Hip hop
- Label: Rhino/Atlantic
- Producer: De La Soul, various

De La Soul chronology
The Best of De La Soul (2003)	Live at Tramps, NYC, 1996 (2004)	De La Mix Tape: Remixes, Rarities and Classics (2004)

Professional ratings
Review scores
Source	Rating
AllMusic	2/5 stars
PopMatters	Favourable
Rolling Stone	2/5 stars

Live at Tramps, NYC, 1996 is a live album recorded by American hip hop group De La Soul on May 16, 1996, at New York City's Tramps nightclub and released in 2004.

During the performances, the group is joined by Jungle Brothers, Common, and Mos Def.

In 2024, to commemorate the album's 20th anniversary, it was reissued on vinyl, CD and on streaming services for the first time.

== Track listing ==
1. Maseo Intro – 0:42
2. Breakadawn – 3:02
3. Supa Emcees – 3:09
4. Potholes in My Lawn – 2:37
5. Big Brother Beat – 3:57
  - Guest appearance: Mos Def
6. Me Myself And I – 2:19
7. Shwingalokate – 1:48
8. Ego Trippin' (Part Two) – 3:37
9. Oodles of O's – 2:36
10. The Bitch in Yoo – 1:37
  - Guest appearance: Common
11. The Bizness – 4:21
  - Guest appearance: Common
12. Itzsoweezee (HOT) – 2:15
13. Buddy – 3:01
  - Guest appearance: Jungle Brothers
14. Stakes Is High – 4:42
15. Goodbyes – 0:49
