= Spitkicker =

Artist collective

The Spitkicker collective is a group of artists that collaborated in the early 2000s to produce a variety of media, mostly focused on hip-hop and social activism. The group was founded in 2000, and its core members included De La Soul, Pharoahe Monch, Talib Kweli, and Dave Chappelle. Members of the group have reconnected for collaborations until at least 2020.

== History ==
=== Spitkicker Tour ===
Spitkicker started via a U.S. hip-hop tour for a set of socially conscious artists in 2000. The first tour featured De La Soul, Talib Kweli, Pharoahe Monch, Biz Markie, Hi-Tek, and Common. The tour was designed with "like-minded lyricists" in mind, rather than "label-mates", and according to one review, the name "Spitkicker" "borrows from the notion of spit, or water, being the most necessary ingredient for growth".

The tour met with positive reviews, which labeled some of the artists as revered in the underground hip-hop scene, and largely described concerts as entertaining, comedic, clever, and thoughtful. Critics noted that acts tended to cut against the dominant style of rap at the time, focusing on underground hip-hop rather than gangsta rap or hardcore hip-hop. Reviews also directly compared the messaging of the Spitkicker tour to the simultaneous Up In Smoke Tour and its artists like Eminem, Dr. Dre, and Snoop Dogg. After the success of this tour, the collective aimed to repeat yearly national tours, and completed at least three, but the 2001 tour had scheduling issues when it merged with the Mekka Tour, which was then cancelled. By the time the 2001 Spitkicker tour was rescheduled, only De La Soul, Talib Kweli, Hi-Tek, and Biz Markie remained on the roster.

=== Spitkicker Community ===
The Spitkickers collective formed around many of the same artists from the inaugural Spitkicker tour, but added new artists like those of A Tribe Called Quest, and other types of performers like comedian Dave Chappelle. During the year 2000, while the first tour was going, the Spitkicker artists branched into online media, centering around their new site spitkicker.com (later changed to spitkickers.com). The site became an online community for the Spitkicker artists and their fans, with some noted parallels to the Okayplayer online community that grew out from The Roots. The first question in the Spitkicker.com FAQ addressed this topic from the collective's perspective:

While there are many similarities between us and our fam, Okayplayer.com, there are just as many differences as well. Aside from having different artists involved, Spitkicker is a movement that extends far past the website. Spitkicker offers Tours, MIX CD's, merchandise, SpitKronicle, parties, exclusive downloads, Spitkicker radio, charity auctions, contests, as well as opportunities to chat with some of your favorite artists. You will also see more differences as we continue to involve.

Spitkicker artists used their website to communicate directly with their fans: De La Soul ran their own promotion via the site after the collapse of their label, and artists shared exclusive news via the site's mailing list. In February 2003, De La Soul claimed the site got 250,000 hits each month, and by 2005, they were using the website to spur a fan petition towards MTV. The website also appears as a character in their Art Official Intelligence albums. Message boards on the site focused on hip-hop and pop culture, while Spitkronicle (later, Spit) was a staffed online magazine that hosted interviews, reviews, and updates on collective members. Other projects hosted by the Spitkickers included Spitkicker Radio, collaborations and mixtapes, and recurring parties. The collective released eight CDs under the "Next Spit" name, and inclusion in one of these compilations was once a prize for independent artists participating in a Music Nation hip-hop competition.

== Discography ==
- Spitkicker Mixtape Vol. 1 - 2003 - mixed by Knockout Kingz, DJ KO and DJ Rahlo - Hosted by De La Soul
- Spitkicker Collabos Vol. 1 - 2004 - mixed by DJ Ayres and DJ Eleven - Hosted by De La Soul
- Spitkicker Collabos Vol. 2 - 2004 -mixed by DJ Ayres and DJ Eleven - Hosted by Phife Dawg, J-Live, and Wordsworth
- The Best of Talib Kweli - 2004 - mixed by DJ Eleven - Talib Kweli
- Rock Co. Kane Flow - 2004 - De La Soul ft. MF Doom
- The Best of A Tribe Called Quest Vol. 1 (with Smokin' Needles) - 2005 - mixed by DJ Rasta Root - Executive Producer Phife Dawg
- Fight Music - The Best of M.O.P. - 2006 - M.O.P.
- The Next Spit, Vol.s 1-8 - mixed by DJ Crossphada, DJ Eleven, J-Live, DJ Balance

== Members ==
- De La Soul - hip hop group (Dave/David Jolicoeur, Maseo/Vincent Mason, Posdnuos/Kelvin Mercer)
- Talib Kweli - rapper
- Pharoahe Monch - rapper
- Dave Chappelle - comedian
- Freddie Foxxx - rapper
- Phife Dawg - rapper (announced June 5, 2003)
- Res - singer
- Black Star - rap duo (Mos Def and Talib Kweli)
- Marcus Samuelsson - chef (announced September 11, 2003)
- Kanye West - rapper
- Black Ice - rapper
- M.O.P. - rap duo (Billy Danze, Lil' Fame)
- J-Live - rapper
- MF Doom - rapper
- Jean Grae - rapper
- Zion I - hip hop group (Baba Zumbi, Amp Live)
- Wordsworth - rapper
- Michael Rapaport - actor, comedian
- DJ Balance - DJ
- DJ Eleven - DJ
- DJ Rasta Root - DJ
- The Knockout Kingz - DJ
- Ali Shaheed Muhammad - DJ, producer
- Anson Carter - ice hockey player

== See also ==
- Soulquarians
- Okayplayer
