= The Magic Number =

Single by De La Soul

from the album 3 Feet High and Rising
- A-side: "Buddy"
- Released: 1989
- Genre: Hip-hop
- Length: 3:16
- Label: Tommy Boy
- Songwriters: David Jolicoeur; Vincent Mason; Kelvin Mercer; Paul Huston
- Producers: De La Soul; Prince Paul

De La Soul singles chronology
"Potholes in My Lawn" (1988)	"The Magic Number" / "Buddy" (1989)	"Eye Know" (1989)

Official audio
- "The Magic Number" on YouTube

"The Magic Number" is a song by American hip-hop group De La Soul, released in 1989 as a single from their debut studio album 3 Feet High and Rising (1989). It gained popularity after being used in the end credits of the film Spider-Man: No Way Home (2021).

== Background ==
De La Soul is an American hip-hop group from Long Island, New York. It consisted of David Jolicoeur (Trugoy the Dove), Vincent Mason (Maseo), and Kelvin Mercer (Posdnous). The group got signed to Tommy Boy Records. With producer Prince Paul, they went to Calliope Studios to create a record. "The Magic Number" is the second song of the group's debut album 3 Feet High and Rising (1989), following "Intro".

== Composition ==
Posdnous and Trugoy provided vocals to "The Magic Number". The song contained a sample from Bob Dorough's "Three Is a Magic Number". In a 2009 interview, Trugoy said, "Obviously three of us in the group, '3 is the magic number' became the philosophy, but mostly, it was just a song that we loved and it became part of the album."

The drums of "The Magic Number" were taken from Double Dee and Steinski's "Lesson 3", a chopped version of John Bonham's drum breaks on Led Zeppelin's "The Crunge". A line from Johnny Cash's "Five Feet High and Rising" ("How high's the water, mama? Three feet high and rising.") was also used in the song. Multiple records were scratched at the end of the song.

In a 2016 interview, Posdnuos said, "It's one of those songs that has always had this great energy and freshness, because it brings everything together at the end, and it means a lot – three friends who've stuck through everything and have been through so many ups and downs, and have maintained what people consider a magic bond."

== Release ==
De La Soul released "The Magic Number" in 1989 as a single from the album 3 Feet High and Rising (1989). In the United Kingdom, it remains the group's highest charting single, peaking at number 7.

Due to sample clearances and other legal issues, De La Soul's first six albums were unavailable on digital streaming services for decades. The catalog was acquired by Reservoir Media as part of its acquisition of the Tommy Boy Records catalog. These albums were made available on digital streaming platforms on March 3, 2023.

"The Magic Number" was made available on digital streaming platforms for the first time on January 13, 2023. To celebrate the occasion, De La Soul also released the song as a 7-inch vinyl single, a cassette single, and a digital download.

== Critical reception ==
Jack Needham of Red Bull Music Academy wrote, "The Prince Paul-produced single, taken from De La's landmark rap debut 3 Feet High and Rising, helped usher in a new phase of modern hip-hop alongside records from the Beastie Boys (Paul's Boutique, 1989) and A Tribe Called Quest (The Low End Theory, 1991)."

In 2017, NME placed the song at number 77 on its list of the "100 Best Songs of the 1980s".

== In other media ==
"The Magic Number" was used in the end credits of the film Spider-Man: No Way Home (2021).

The song was featured in the 2025 sports simulation game, MLB The Show 25

== Personnel ==
Credits adapted from liner notes.

- De La Soul – production, arrangement
- Prince Paul – production, mixing
- Scotty Hard – mixing
- Michael Fossenkemper – mastering
- Deborah Mannis-Gardner – sample clearances

== Charts ==
Chart performance for "Buddy" / "The Magic Number"
Chart (1990)	Peak position
Netherlands (Single Top 100)	39
UK Singles (Official Charts)	7

Chart performance for "The Magic Number"
Chart (2023)	Peak position
UK Singles Downloads (Official Charts)	71
