= Ring Ring Ring (Ha Ha Hey) =

Single by De La Soul

from the album De La Soul Is Dead
- B-side: "Afro Connection at Hi-5"
- Released: May 27, 1991
- Genre: Funk; hip hop
- Length: 5:15 (album version); 4:08 (single version)
- Label: Tommy Boy
- Songwriters: Paul Huston; Kelvin Mercer; David Jolicoeur; Vincent Mason; Ben Volpeliere-Pierrot; Julian Godfrey Brookhouse; Nick Thorpe; Migi Drummond; Glenn Skinner; Michael John McEvoy
- Producers: Paul Huston; De La Soul

De La Soul singles chronology
| "Tread Water" (1990) | "Ring Ring Ring (Ha Ha Hey)" (1991) | "A Roller Skating Jam Named "Saturdays"" (1991) |

Music video
- "Ring Ring Ring (Ha Ha Hey)" on YouTube

"Ring Ring Ring (Ha Ha Hey)" is a song by American hip hop trio De La Soul, released in May 1991 by Tommy Boy Records as the lead single from their second album, De La Soul Is Dead (1991). It is a party jam about overzealous fans who pursue the group with demo tapes in their efforts to obtain an endorsement from the group. The song was inspired by one overzealous fan in particular, Breakestra frontman Miles Tackett, who was shopping demo tapes to the group (note "demo tapes by the miles" in the song's subtitle). It was very successful on the charts in Europe, reaching number one in Finland, Greece and Switzerland, as well as on the UK Dance chart. Additionally, the song was a top-10 hit also in Australia, Austria, Belgium, Denmark, Germany, the Netherlands, New Zealand and the UK. Its accompanying music video was directed by Mark Romanek.

== Composition ==
"Ring Ring Ring (Ha Ha Hey)" has been assumed to have sampled the 1982 Fat Larry's Band song "Act Like You Know"; but in fact, it samples the 1981 The Whatnauts song "Help Is on the Way", that replays the same bassline as "Act Like You Know". The chorus of "Ring Ring Ring" is, an interpolation of the Curiosity Killed the Cat song "Name and Number". The bass in the introduction comes from Lou Johnson's "Beat" and the drum break is from The Honey Drippers' "Impeach the President". The single version's saxophone is original.

== Critical reception ==
Upon the release, Larry Flick from Billboard magazine felt the rap trio "returns with a funk-driven workout that benefits from a cute and contagious chorus—not to mention group's signature clever wordplay." Irish Evening Herald stated that the single "shows that the trio still have the imagination to bring off the big one." Everett True from Melody Maker named it Single of the Week, writing, "So De La Soul are back — tear up that ticker-tape, roll out them barrels, find yourself a megaphone and prepare to storm the barricades. It's an occasion, understand? A happening. A joyous event to be broadcast from each and every window, as and when you find them." Pan-European magazine Music & Media named it one of two "best tracks" of De La Soul Is Dead. Record Mirror said, "Using, of all things, a Curiosity Killed The Cat song for its chorus. Chunky and funky." Miranda Sawyer from Smash Hits gave "Ring Ring Ring (Ha Ha Hey)" a score of six out of ten, adding, "It sounds most pleasant and as usual is chirruped along by an effortless groove and wiggy lyrics, but, well, it's not in the same league as 'Eye Know' or 'Mama Gave Birth' because there's not enough twiddly bits and that's always a mistake in a rap record." Bob Mack from Spin stated that "the music and delivery are fresh as ever. But the subject matter—a gripe about would-be rappers bugging De La to get their demos signed—seems out of place and a smidge arrogant."

In a retrospective review, Justin Chadwick from Albumism described "Ring Ring Ring (Ha Ha Hey)" as "undeniably irresistible", noting that the song is driven by "astute commentary", "unabashed sarcasm" and a "rousingly rhythmic groove". He complimented the chorus as "memorable", stating that it is a "further testament to De La Soul and Prince Paul's uncanny penchant for merging obscure samples with more familiar fare to craft instantly unforgettable tunes that stick with you." Steve Huey from AllMusic remarked that it "complains about being harassed into listening to lousy demo tapes."

== Music video ==
A black-and-white music video was produced to promote the single, directed by American director Mark Romanek. It features the members of De La Soul and producer Prince Paul in a cameo as an artist trying to hand them his tapes.

== Influence ==
- This song was interpolated on Jaheim's 2009 single, "Ain't Leavin Without You".
- The 2013 Little Mix single "How Ya Doin'?" uses the same lyrics which "Ring Ring Ring" uses.

All 3 songs use the same beat from "Help Is on the Way".

== Track listings ==
- 12-inch maxi, Europe
1. "Ring Ring Ring (Ha Ha Hey)" (party line mix) (6:56)
2. "Ring Ring Ring (Ha Ha Hey)" (extended decision U.S. mix) (5:15)
3. "Ring Ring Ring (Ha Ha Hey)" (piles and piles of demo taped bi-da miles - Conley's decision) (4:05)
- 12-inch maxi, US
1. "Ring Ring Ring (Ha Ha Hey)" (extended decision) (5:15)
2. "Ring Ring Ring (Ha Ha Hey)" (radio decision) (3:59)
3. "Piles And Piles of demo Tapes Bi-Da Miles (Conley's Decision)" (4:05)
4. "Afro Connection At A Hi 5 (In The Eyes Of The Hoodlum)" (3:42)
- 7-inch single
1. "Ring Ring Ring (Ha Ha Hey)" (Party Line Edit) (4:05)
2. "Ring Ring Ring (piles and piles of demo taped bi-da miles - Conley's decision) (4:05)
- CD maxi
1. "Ring Ring Ring (Ha Ha Hey)" (party line edit) (4:05)
2. "Ring Ring Ring (Ha Ha Hey)" (party line mix) (6:56)
3. "Ring Ring Ring (Ha Ha Hey)" (extended U.S. mix) (5:15)
4. "Ring Ring Ring" (piles and piles of demo taped bi-da miles) (3:35)
- CD maxi / 12-inch maxi - Remixes
1. "Ring Ring Ring (Ha Ha Hey)" (CJ's alternative mix) (5:10)
2. "Afro Connection At A Hi 5" (3:42)
3. "Ring Ring Ring (Ha Ha Hey)" (sax mix) (5:10)

== Charts ==
=== Weekly charts ===
Weekly chart performance for "Ring Ring Ring (Ha Ha Hey)"
| Chart (1991) | Peak position |
|---|---|
| Australia (ARIA) | 4 |
| Austria (Ö3 Austria Top 40) | 10 |
| Belgium (Ultratop 50 Flanders) | 8 |
| Denmark (IFPI) | 8 |
| Europe (Eurochart Hot 100) | 8 |
| Europe (European Hit Radio) | 13 |
| Finland (Suomen virallinen lista) | 1 |
| France (SNEP) | 19 |
| Germany (GfK) | 8 |
| Greece (IFPI) | 1 |
| Ireland (IRMA) | 12 |
| Italy (Musica e dischi) | 11 |
| Netherlands (Dutch Top 40) | 2 |
| Netherlands (Single Top 100) | 2 |
| New Zealand (Recorded Music NZ) | 5 |
| Sweden (Sverigetopplistan) | 15 |
| Switzerland (Schweizer Hitparade) | 1 |
| UK Singles (Official Charts) | 10 |
| UK Airplay (Music Week) | 19 |
| UK Dance (Music Week) | 1 |
| UK Club Chart (Record Mirror) | 3 |
| US Dance Club Songs (Billboard) | 16 |
| US Dance Singles Sales (Billboard) | 8 |
| US Hot R&B/Hip-Hop Songs (Billboard) | 22 |
| US Hot Rap Songs (Billboard) | 3 |

=== Year-end charts ===
Year-end chart performance for "Ring Ring Ring (Ha Ha Hey)"
| Chart (1991) | Position |
|---|---|
| Australia (ARIA) | 37 |
| Belgium (Ultratop) | 51 |
| Europe (Eurochart Hot 100) | 31 |
| Europe (European Hit Radio) | 80 |
| Germany (Media Control) | 41 |
| Italy (Musica e dischi) | 78 |
| Netherlands (Dutch Top 40) | 29 |
| Netherlands (Single Top 100) | 29 |
| New Zealand (RIANZ) | 17 |
| Sweden (Topplistan) | 83 |
| Switzerland (Schweizer Hitparade) | 10 |
| UK Club Chart (Record Mirror) | 37 |

== Certifications ==
| Region | Certification | Certified units/sales |
|---|---|---|
| Australia (ARIA) | Gold | 35,000^{^} |
| New Zealand (RMNZ) | Gold | 5,000^{*} |
^{*} Sales figures based on certification alone.^{^} Shipments figures based on certification alone.
