= Hip-hop skit =

Type of comedy sketch performed on hip-hop albums

A hip-hop skit is a form of sketch comedy that appears on a hip-hop album or mixtape, and is usually written and performed by the artists themselves. Skits can appear on albums or mixtapes as individual tracks, or at the beginning or end of a song. Some skits are part of concept albums and contribute to an album's concept. Skits also occasionally appear on albums of other genres.

== History and style ==
3 Feet High and Rising, the 1989 debut album by De La Soul, is generally regarded as the album that popularized the hip-hop skit. Prince Paul, producer of 3 Feet High and Rising, has described the group's intent with their skits as follows:

Rap records always had some dialogue in them, like, 'Hey, man, I'm gonna smack you in the face,' or, 'Yo... let's get it!' but they weren't sketches with a whole vibe to them. We did it to fill that void, to give our album some structure. It was just something we tried out and it evolved. We never thought it would become a rap album staple.

Skits came to be widespread in hip-hop albums throughout the 1990s. They were frequently employed to help establish an album's prevailing mood, or to contextualize the artist's background and lifestyle. Common categories of skit include violent confrontations, sexual encounters, and "answering machine vignettes". Skits have also been seen as a venue to add levity to albums, especially as the rise of gangsta rap made humor less common in the songs themselves. Despite their prevalence, skits have been controversial with audiences. They have often been accused of being filler designed to pad out an album's runtime and tracklist. The humor in skits has also been criticized as being frequently crass or offensive.

Skits have declined in popularity in the twenty-first century. The advent of the MP3 format is widely attributed as being responsible for this decline, since the move from album-based listening to shuffleable music libraries made the presence of skits less desirable.

== Notable skits ==
- De La Soul's 1991 album, De La Soul Is Dead, has been praised for its "postmodern" series of skits in which a group of bullies steal the album and deride its content.
- The "Deeez Nuuuts" skit on Dr. Dre's The Chronic has been recognized for its lasting popularity.
- The "Torture" skit at the start of the Wu-Tang Clan's song "Method Man" has been heralded for its over-the-top dark humor. This skit was later referenced in a Chappelle's Show sketch.
- Kendrick Lamar's 2012 album, Good Kid, M.A.A.D City, has been acknowledged as a 21st-century album that uses skits effectively. Throughout the album, these skits are presented as a series of voicemails from Kendrick's parents, which help to shape and contextualize the album's sequencing.
