= All That "Hip Hop" =

Compilation album by Various artists
- Released: 2005
- Genre: Alternative Hip Hop
- Label: Warner Music Australia

All That "Hip Hop" is an alternative hip hop music compilation album by Warner Music Australia. It is a collection of three CDs containing music from various artists, released in 2005.

== Track listing ==
=== Disc 1 ===
1. Afrika Bambaataa & Soul Sonic Force - "Planet Rock"
2. Busta Rhymes - "It's a Party"
3. Coolio - "1, 2, 3, 4 (Sumpin' New)"
4. Lil' Kim - "The Jump Off"
5. Stetsasonic - "Talkin' All That Jazz"
6. Fabolous - "Can't Let You Go"
7. Ice-T - "You Played Yourself"
8. Missy Elliott - "Pass That Dutch"
9. Kulcha - "Booty Funk"
10. Knoc-Turn'al - "Have Fun"
11. Leaders Of The New School - "Case of the P.T.A."
12. Nappy Roots - "Awnaw" (featuring Jazze Pha)
13. Queen Latifah - "Come Into My House"
14. Naughty By Nature - "Everything's Gonna Be Alright"
15. Noreaga - "Body In The Trunk" (featuring Nas)

=== Disc 2 ===
1. Missy Elliott - "Work It"
2. De La Soul - "Me, Myself And I"
3. Fabolous - "Can't Deny It" (featuring Nate Dogg)
4. Ice-T - "Colors"
5. Busta Rhymes - "Put Your Hands Where My Eyes Could See"
6. Capone-N-Noreaga - "Phonetime"
7. Nappy Roots - "Kentucky Mud"
8. Noreaga - "Superthug"
9. Ol' Dirty Bastard - "Proteck Ya Neck II The Zoo"
10. Queen Latifah - "Latifah's Law"
11. Stetsasonic - "Go Brooklyn 3"
12. House of Pain - "Shamrocks And Shenanigans"
13. Everlast - "Never Missin' A Beat"
14. Kulcha - "Nasty"
15. Digital Underground - "The Return Of The Crazy One"

=== Disc 3 ===
1. Coolio - "Too Hot"
2. De La Soul - "Potholes in My Lawn"
3. Lil' Kim - "Queen B@#$H"
4. House of Pain - "Same As It Ever Was"
5. Ol' Dirty Bastard - "Brooklyn Zoo"
6. Nate Dogg - "I Got Love"
7. Queen Latifah & Monie Love - "Ladies First"
8. Everlast - "Money (Dollar Bill)" (featuring Sadat X)
9. Capone-N-Noreaga - "Invincible"
10. K7 - "Come Baby Come"
11. Kulcha - "Bring It On"
12. RuPaul - "Supermodel (You Better Work)"
13. Digital Underground - "Doowutchyalike"
14. Naughty By Nature - "Feel Me Flow"
15. Da Lench Mob - "Freedom Got An AK"
