= De La Soul Is Dead =

Studio album by De La Soul
- Released: May 14, 1991
- Recorded: 1990–1991
- Studios: Calliope Studios, New York City
- Genres: East Coast hip hop; alternative hip hop
- Length: 73:49
- Labels: Tommy Boy; Warner Bros.
- Producers: De La Soul; Prince Paul

De La Soul chronology
3 Feet High and Rising (1989)	De La Soul Is Dead (1991)	Buhloone Mindstate (1993)

Singles from De La Soul Is Dead
- 1. "Ring Ring Ring (Ha Ha Hey)" Released: May 27, 1991; 2. "A Roller Skating Jam Named 'Saturdays'" Released: July 23, 1991; 3. "Millie Pulled a Pistol on Santa"/"Keepin' the Faith" Released: 1991

De La Soul Is Dead is the second studio album by American hip hop group De La Soul, released on May 14, 1991. The album was produced by Prince Paul, whose work on 3 Feet High and Rising was highly praised by music critics. The album was one of the first to receive a five-mic rating in the hip-hop magazine The Source, and it was also selected as one of The Source's "100 Best Albums" in 1998. The album's cover refers to the death of the "D.A.I.S.Y." (Da Inner Sound, Y'all) age, or a distancing from several cultures including hippies and mainstream hip hop.

In 2020, Rolling Stone placed the album at number 228 on their "500 Greatest Albums of All Time" list.

== Music and lyrics ==
De La Soul Is Dead departed from the image that the group had fostered on their previous album, 3 Feet High and Rising. While De La Soul Is Dead retains the humorous approach of its predecessor, its humor is darker, featuring more biting parodies and a more cynical outlook. The album also attracted attention for its discussion of weightier topics, especially the portrayal of drug addiction in "My Brother's a Basehead" and the story of sexual abuse in "Millie Pulled a Pistol on Santa". Lead single "Ring Ring Ring (Ha Ha Hey)" has been seen as emblematic of the album's prevailing mood: the lyrics, where the group complains about being harassed by aspiring artists trying to ride their coattails, showcases the album's wearier attitude, while the production counterbalances that cynicism with a "playful post-disco groove". Other tracks on De La Soul Is Dead display a more fully lighthearted attitude, such as the summery, disco-influenced "A Roller Skating Jam Named 'Saturdays'", and the back-and-forth banter of "Bitties in the BK Lounge".

Reflecting on the album and its goals, producer Prince Paul has stated:

We were trying to prove we weren't just a one-album act. And there was a lot of disillusionment with the music industry. When I listen to it now, the raps sound—shall we say—bitter?

Conversely, group member Posdnuos has argued that De La Soul Is Dead is not as cynical as its reputation suggests, telling The Guardian in 2025:

The second album was still bright and fun. OK, the word 'dead' in the title doesn't help ... But we meant it to indicate we were transferring to another plane, that we were metamorphosing into older kids. We were just growing.

In 2008 the album was re-released on vinyl without the CD version's bonus tracks.

=== Title and cover art ===
De La Soul chose the title De La Soul Is Dead to emphasize their departure from their previous style. The group's separation from the "D.A.I.S.Y Age" imagery of 3 Feet High and Rising is visually demonstrated by the album cover, which shows a broken pot of daisies, as well as by the music video for "Ring Ring Ring (Ha Ha Hey)", which depicts a pot of daisies being smashed. Maseo has stated that the group's goal was "breaking the stereotype and the stigmatism that was put on us with the hippy concept when D.A.I.S.Y. just was an acronym for Da Inner Sound Y'all."

=== Skits ===
The album features a series of separate, ongoing skits, which parody old children's book-and-record read-along sets by utilizing a recurring bell sound that lets the reader know that it is time to turn the imaginary page. The introduction to the album features Jeff, a teenage character (introduced in the B-sides to "Eye Know" and "Me Myself and I": "Brain Washed Follower", "The Mack Daddy on the Left", and the rare "Double Huey Skit"). Jeff finds a cassette tape copy of a De La Soul album in the garbage. Bullies appear, beat up Jeff, and steal the tape. Ensuing skits feature these bullies harshly criticizing the songs on the album. Mista Lawnge of Black Sheep provides the voice of the lead antagonist called Hemorrhoid, P.A. Pasemaster Mase voices the second bully, while a third gets ridiculed and abused by Lawnge for his admiration of the album. In the end, they throw the tape back in the trash, exclaiming, "De La Soul is dead". The album also introduces a fictional radio station called WRMS that plays nothing but "De La Slow" music.

== Critical reception ==
Professional ratings
Review scores
Source	Rating
AllMusic	4/5 stars
Chicago Tribune	3/4 stars
Entertainment Weekly	C+
Los Angeles Times	3/5 stars
NME	6/10
Q	4/5 stars
Rolling Stone	4/5 stars
The Rolling Stone Album Guide	4.5/5 stars
The Source	5/5 stars
Spin Alternative Record Guide	7/10

After the widespread acclaim that 3 Feet High and Rising attained, De La Soul Is Dead became a highly anticipated album for which listeners built high expectations. However, when De La Soul Is Dead was ultimately released, its change in stylistic direction led to a divided critical reception. Outlets that reviewed the album positively included Rolling Stone, who described it as "an unruly, seemingly effortless hip-hop masterpiece", and The Source, who characterized the album as featuring "musical and lyrical talent combined with unlimited creativity and an ingenious sense of humor". In contrast, the Los Angeles Times opined that De La Soul were "bitter" and "riding a bummer" on the album, NME felt that they "sound thoroughly bored" and that their attempts at humor "seem an after-thought or forced", and Entertainment Weekly described the album's mood as "smug and self-righteous". The production on the album attained a more broadly positive consensus: the Los Angeles Times and The Source both praised the album's instrumentation, and Rolling Stone commented that it was "knee-deep in hooks and rhythmic reversals that play like a history of pop experimentalism". The Chicago Tribune remarked that "the samples are less instantly infectious [and] the tempos slower" than on 3 Feet High and Rising, but that De La Soul Is Dead was nevertheless "nearly as rewarding". However, Entertainment Weekly was less impressed by the album's production, describing it as "full of songs that are tuneless or slight".

In the years since the album's release, critics have come to view De La Soul Is Dead more positively. In 1998, it was included in The Source's "100 Best Albums" list. The album placed 228th on Rolling Stone's 2020 list of the 500 greatest albums of all time and 74th on Spin magazine's list of the best albums of the 1990s; further, Exclaim! labeled De La Soul Is Dead as the best album in De La Soul's catalogue. A retrospective review from NPR praised the album for its "wild, creative swings" into eclectic samples and boundary-pushing concepts, describing it as one of the most "creatively sprawling" entries in an era of hip hop where numerous artists were attempting stylistic experimentation. The Exclaim! review, meanwhile, identified De La Soul Is Dead as the album on which the group established their "signature sound and style" and "street philosopher image". A more mixed retrospective review came from Steve Huey of AllMusic, who found the album "less cohesive and engaging" than its predecessor, but still "fascinating in spite of its flaws".

== Commercial performance ==
The album was certified gold on July 18, 1991, selling over 500,000 copies.

== Track listing ==
All tracks written by P. Huston, K. Mercer, D. Jolicoeur, V. Mason; additional writers credited below.

De La Soul Is Dead track listing
No.	Title	Writer(s)	Length
1.	"Intro"	C. Johns; L. Farrow	2:14
2.	"Oodles of O's"	T. Waits	3:31
3.	"Talkin' Bout Hey Love"	S. Gainsbourg; S. Wonder; C. Paul	2:27
4.	"Pease Porridge"	A. Goodhart; A. Hoffman; H. Magidson	5:02
5.	"Skit 1"		0:25
6.	"Johnny's Dead AKA Vincent Mason (Live from the BK Lounge)"		1:57
7.	"A Roller Skating Jam Named 'Saturdays'"	R. Matthews; J. Davis	4:03
8.	"WRMS' Dedication to the Bitty"	J. Sample	0:46
9.	"Bitties in the BK Lounge"	K. Nix; R. Isley; R. Isley; O.K. Isley	5:40
10.	"Skit 2"		0:31
11.	"My Brother's a Basehead"	C. Ballard Jr.; R. Krieger	4:20
12.	"Let, Let Me In"	B. McCracken; L. Fulson; B. Birthright	3:25
13.	"Afro Connections at a Hi 5 (In the Eyes of the Hoodlum)"		4:02
14.	"Rap de Rap Show"		2:19
15.	"Millie Pulled a Pistol on Santa"	G. Clinton; G. Cook	4:10
16.	"Who Do U Worship?"		1:59
17.	"Skit 3"		0:31
18.	"Kicked Out the House"		1:56
19.	"Pass the Plugs"	E. Wright; W. Smith; J. Perry	3:30
20.	"Not Over till the Fat Lady Plays the Demo"	S. Gainsbourg; J.C. Vannier	1:29
21.	"Ring Ring Ring (Ha Ha Hey)"	G. Skinner	5:06
22.	"WRMS: Cat's in Control"	J. Sample	0:34
23.	"Skit 4"		0:12
24.	"Shwingalokate"	K. McCord; G. Clinton; B. Nelson	4:14
25.	"Fanatic of the B Word" (featuring Dres)	M. Jones; D. Kinsey; A. Titus	4:09
26.	"Keepin' the Faith"	B. Marley; R. Temperton; M. Adams	4:45
27.	"Skit 5"		0:32
Total length:			73:49

The LP and cassette versions of the album did not include all of the tracks found on the CD release. The LP omitted "My Brother's a Basehead", "Afro Connections at a Hi 5 (In the Eyes of the Hoodlum)", "Who Do U Worship?", "Kicked Out the House" and "Not Over till the Fat Lady Plays the Demo", while the cassette omitted "Johnny's Dead AKA Vincent Mason (Live from the BK Lounge)", "My Brother's a Basehead", "Who Do U Worship?" and "Kicked Out the House".

== Personnel ==
Technical

- De La Soul – production
- Prince Paul – production
- Mike Teelucksingh – mixing engineer
- Lisle Leete – mixing engineer
- Tee Mario – mixing engineer
- Anthony Sanders – mixing engineer
- Chris Irwin – mixing engineer
- Bob Powers – mixing engineer
- Pat Gordon – mixing engineer
- Tim Lathan – mixing engineer
- Al Watts – mixing engineer
- Tom Coyne – mastering

Artwork

- Mark Weinberg – logo design
- Joesph Buckingham – cover illustration
- Al Callabrass – liner note illustration

Playground honeys

- Alexis
- Donnis
- Caitlin
- Tiffany
- Christine

Playground ruffnecks

- Mister Lawnge
- Maseo
- D.J. Aub (from the group home)

== Charts ==
=== Weekly charts ===
Weekly chart performance for De La Soul Is Dead
Chart (1991)	Peak position
Australian Albums (ARIA)	12
Austrian Albums (Ö3 Austria)	20
Dutch Albums (Album Top 100)	20
German Albums (Offizielle Top 100)	12
New Zealand Albums (RMNZ)	6
Swedish Albums (Sverigetopplistan)	32
Swiss Albums (Schweizer Hitparade)	17
UK Albums (Official Charts)	7
US Billboard 200	26
US Top R&B/Hip-Hop Albums (Billboard)	24

2023 weekly chart performance for De La Soul Is Dead
Chart (2023)	Peak position
Belgian Albums (Ultratop Flanders)	127
Belgian Albums (Ultratop Wallonia)	152

=== Year-end charts ===
Year-end chart performance for De La Soul Is Dead
Chart (1991)	Position
Dutch Albums (Album Top 100)	77
German Albums (Offizielle Top 100)	94
New Zealand Albums (RMNZ)	47

== Certifications and sales ==
Certifications and sales for De La Soul Is Dead
Region	Certification	Certified units/sales
France	—	50,000
United States (RIAA)	Gold	500,000^{^}
^{^} Shipments figures based on certification alone.
