= AOI: Bionix =

Studio album by De La Soul
- Released: December 4, 2001
- Genre: Hip hop
- Length: 55:15
- Label: Tommy Boy
- Producers: De La Soul; Supa Dave West; Kev Brown; Megahertz; J Dilla; Deaf 2 U Inc.

De La Soul chronology
| Art Official Intelligence: Mosaic Thump (2000) | AOI: Bionix (2001) | The Grind Date (2004) |

Singles from AOI: Bionix
- 1. "Baby Phat" Released: November 6, 2001; 2. "Trying People" Released: July 14, 2002

AOI: Bionix is the sixth studio album by American hip hop group De La Soul, released on December 4, 2001. The album was the second in a planned three-disc installment, which was originally intended to be a three-disc album. It was the last De La project released on Tommy Boy.

== Overview ==
The first single, "Baby Phat" featuring Yummy Bingham and Devin the Dude, was an ode to larger sized women. Elsewhere, "Held Down", featuring Cee-Lo, found Posdnuos in an introspective mood as he mused on fatherhood, religion, and fame. Slick Rick also made an appearance on "What We Do (For Love)"; a humorous song about puberty and sexual discovery. Plans were made to release the Kev Brown-produced "Special" (featuring Yummy Bingham) as the second single, however Tommy Boy soon folded as a label, cutting short any further promotion of Bionix. Like many Hip-Hop albums, there is an official instrumental version of the album available on vinyl, with artwork.

=== Interludes ===
The album featured skits with a character by the name of Reverend Do Good, which worked as social commentary as well as the intros and outros of the songs. The final Reverend Do Good skit acts as one final advertisement for Ghost Weed as heard on De La Soul's previous album, Art Official Intelligence: Mosaic Thump. A mischievous teenager takes a hit of the substance, then morphs into Slum Village frontman J Dilla, who provides the intro and outro to the marijuana-themed song "Peer Pressure" (which he also produced).

== Critical reception ==
Professional ratings
Aggregate scores
| Source | Rating |
|---|---|
| Metacritic | 77/100 |
Review scores
| Source | Rating |
| AllMusic | 4.5/5 stars |
| Robert Christgau | A |
| Entertainment Weekly | B+ |
| HipHopDX | 4.5/5 stars |
| Pitchfork | 7.8/10 |
| Q | 4/5 stars |
| Rolling Stone | 4/5 stars |
| Uncut | 3.5/5 stars |
| USA Today | 3.5/4 stars |
| Vibe | 4/5 stars |

The album received generally favorable reviews. Robert Christgau stated: "Sampling Tavares, Wings, Dr. Buzzard, Laura Nyro, and the Fat Boys--but just barely, more as a sign of what they've been playing than of how they want to sound—they flow as smooth as the '70s grooves they once left back in the old school. Philosophically woman-friendly and musically woman-dependent, they segue effortlessly into Slick Rick sex ed and the orgasmic mock-mock-melodrama of 'Pawn Star'; their gospel chorale is no less on concept than their Reverend Do Good takeoffs. Anyone who ever wondered what hip hop might sound like when it grew up now has an answer. It sounds like a good marriage in a black 'burb, complete with doubts, weed, and a principled refusal to ignore the existence of Somalia."

== Track listing ==
AOI: Bionix
| No. | Title | Writer(s) | Producer(s) | Length |
|---|---|---|---|---|
| 1. | "Intro" | | De La Soul | 0:29 |
| 2. | "Bionix" | Kelvin Mercer; David Jolicoeur; Vincent Mason; Dave West | Supa Dave West | 2:43 |
| 3. | "Baby Phat" (featuring Devin the Dude and Yummy Bingham) | Mercer; Jolicoeur; Mason; West | Supa Dave West | 3:50 |
| 4. | "Simply" | Mercer; Jolicoeur; Mason; West | Supa Dave West | 4:05 |
| 5. | "Simply Havin'" | | De La Soul | 0:48 |
| 6. | "Held Down" (featuring CeeLo Green) | Mercer; Jolicoeur; Mason | Posdnuos | 4:54 |
| 7. | "Reverend Do Good #1" | | De La Soul; Kevin Lewis; Troy Hightower | 1:05 |
| 8. | "Watch Out" (featuring José "Perico" Hernández) | Mercer; Jolicoeur; Mason; West | Supa Dave West | 3:37 |
| 9. | "Special" (featuring Yummy Bingham) | Mercer; Jolicoeur; Mason; West; Kevin Brown | Kev Brown | 3:36 |
| 10. | "Reverend Do Good #2" | | De La Soul; Kevin Lewis; Troy Hightower | 1:14 |
| 11. | "The Sauce" (featuring Philly Black) | | Supa Dave West | 2:25 |
| 12. | "Am I Worth You?" (featuring Glenn Lewis) | Mercer; Jolicoeur; Mason; West; Glenn Lewis | Supa Dave West | 4:01 |
| 13. | "Pawn Star" (featuring Shell Council) | | De La Soul | 4:06 |
| 14. | "What We Do (For Love)" (featuring Slick Rick) | Mercer; Jolicoeur; Mason; Dorsey Wesley; Richard Walters | Megahertz | 5:04 |
| 15. | "Reverend Do Good #3" | | De La Soul; Kevin Lewis; Troy Hightower | 2:20 |
| 16. | "Peer Pressure" (featuring B-Real) | Mercer; Jolicoeur; Mason; James Yancey; Louis Freese | J Dilla | 5:09 |
| 17. | "It's American" | | De La Soul; Kevin Lewis; Troy Hightower | 1:10 |
| 18. | "Trying People" | Mercer; Jolicoeur; Mason; Lucious Mercer; Neal Forrester; Salavander Parker | Def 2 U | 4:31 |
| Total length: | | | | 55:17 |

== Charts ==
Chart performance for AOI: Bionix
| Chart (2001) | Peak Position |
|---|---|
| Australian Albums (ARIA) | 105 |
| French Albums (SNEP) | 119 |
| Swiss Albums (Schweizer Hitparade) | 60 |
| UK Albums (OCC) | 162 |
| US Billboard 200 | 136 |
| US Top R&B/Hip-Hop Albums (Billboard) | 31 |
