= Plug Tunin' =

"Plug Tunin' (Are You Ready for This?)"

Single by De La Soul

from the album 3 Feet High and Rising
- A-side: "Freedom of Speak (We Got Three Minutes)" (double A-side)
- B-side: "Strictly Dan Stuckie"
- Released: June 1988
- Recorded: 1988
- Studio: Calliope Studios, New York City
- Genre: Alternative hip hop
- Length: 3:43
- Label: Tommy Boy
- Songwriter(s): Kelvin Mercer; David Jolicoeur
- Producer(s): Prince Paul, De La Soul

De La Soul singles chronology
"Plug Tunin' (Are You Ready for This?)" / "Freedom of Speak (We Got Three Minutes)" (1988)	"Jenifa (Taught Me)" / "Potholes in My Lawn" (1988)

"Plug Tunin'" (includes the subtitle "Are You Ready for This?") is a song by hip hop trio De La Soul. It was released in June 1988 as the group's debut single as part of a double A-side with "Freedom of Speak (We Got Three Minutes)". A remix of the song, under the title "Plug Tunin' (Last Chance to Comprehend)", would later be included on their debut album 3 Feet High and Rising.

Lyrically, the song is idiosyncratic, however, musically it laid the foundations for the sound the group would realise more fully with their debut album.

In the end of year-roundups, the song placed at No. 40 in the magazine The Face list of best singles of 1988. In January 1998 was included on The Source's "The 100 Best Rap Singles of All Time" list. In 1999, Ego Trip's editors ranked "Plug Tunin'" at No. 8 in their list of Hip Hop's 40 Greatest Singles by Year 1988 in Ego Trip's Book of Rap Lists. In 2013 was ranked by Complex at No. 5 on their list "The 100 Best Native Tongues Songs".

== Sampling ==
De La Soul's label, Tommy Boy, offered a $500 reward for "the first person to identify a convoluted sample" on the song.

"Plug Tunin'" has also been sampled by other artists such as Nas, Common, and the Gravediggaz' "Defective Trip", which is also produced by Prince Paul.

== Conception and composition ==
Lyrically, the song is idiosyncratic; "Transistors are never more shown with like / When vocal flow brings it all down in ruin / Due to a clue of a naughty noise called Plug Tunin' (Hmm-mm, hmm-mm, hmm-mm, hmm-mm, hmmmm)", however, musically it laid the foundations for the sound the group would realise more fully with their debut album 3 Feet High and Rising.

== Track listing ==
1. "Plug Tunin' (Are You Ready for This?)" – 3:41
2. "Freedom of Speak (We Got Three Minutes)" – 2:52
3. "Freedom of Speak (We Got More Than Three)" – 4:16
4. "Plug Tunin' (Something's Wrong Here)" – 3:10
5. "Strictly Dan Stuckie" – 0:38
