= Eye Know =

1989 single by De La Soul

Single by De La Soul

from the album 3 Feet High and Rising
- Released: September 25, 1989
- Recorded: 1988
- Genre: Psychedelic hip-hop
- Length: 4:13 (album version); 4:00 (single version)
- Label: Tommy Boy
- Songwriters: Paul Huston; David Jude Jolicoeur; Vincent Mason; Kelvin Mercer; Walter Becker; Donald Fagen
- Producer: Prince Paul

De La Soul singles chronology
"Buddy" / "The Magic Number" (1988)	"Eye Know" (1989)	"Me Myself and I" (1989)

"Eye Know" is a 1989 single from American hip-hop trio De La Soul's debut album 3 Feet High and Rising. It peaked at number 14 on the UK singles chart. It was not released as a single in the United States.

== Composition ==
The song is an upbeat love song featuring guitar and horn samples from The Mad Lads' "Make This Young Lady Mine", whistle sample from Otis Redding's "(Sittin' On) The Dock of the Bay", guitar, keyboard, bass, and vocal samples from Steely Dan's "Peg", drums from Lee Dorsey's "Get Out of My Life, Woman", and additional drums from Sly and the Family Stone’s “Sing a Simple Song”.

The B-side "The Mack Daddy on the Left" features David Jolicoeur's 12-year old cousin Jeff as a guest rapper. He later appeared as Philly Black on "The Sauce" from the album AOI: Bionix.

== In other media ==
This song was used on the British television program Match of the Day 2 as background music during the showing of Saturday's goals from 2004 to 2008.

"Eye Know" appears in the 2023 film Teenage Mutant Ninja Turtles: Mutant Mayhem.

== Track listing ==
1. "Eye Know (The Know It All Mix)"
2. "Eye Know (The Kiss Mix)"
3. "The Mack Daddy on the Left"
  - Guest Appearance: Trugoy's cousin Jeff

== Charts ==
=== Weekly charts ===
Chart (1989)	Peak position
Belgium (Ultratop 50 Flanders)	24
Netherlands (Dutch Top 40)	20
Netherlands (Single Top 100)	17
UK Singles (Official Charts)	14
