= Me Myself and I (De La Soul song) =

1989 single by De La Soul

Single by De La Soul

from the album 3 Feet High and Rising
- B-side: "Jenifa Taught Me (Derwin's Revenge)"
- Released: March 21, 1989
- Recorded: 1988
- Studio: Calliope Studios (Brooklyn, New York)
- Genre: Alternative rap
- Length: 3:50
- Label: Tommy Boy
- Songwriters: Paul Huston; David Jude Jolicoeur; Vincent Mason; Kelvin Mercer
- Producer: Prince Paul

De La Soul singles chronology
"Eye Know" (1989)	"Me Myself and I" (1989)	"Say No Go" (1989)

Music video
- "Me Myself and I" Video on YouTube

"Me Myself and I" is a song by American hip hop trio De La Soul, released in March 1989 as a single from their debut studio album, 3 Feet High and Rising. It was the group's only number one on the US Billboard R&B chart. The song also topped the Billboard Hot Dance Club Play chart.

The song's number one position in The Netherlands was spurred by the VPRO television station, who made a documentary about De La Soul after meeting them when they were still unknown.

== Background and composition ==
De La Soul member Posdnuos stated: "The words were written pretty quick. [...] The press was referring to us as the hippies of hip-hop. This song became a way to express that this wasn't a gimmick, and that we were being ourselves. This is why in my first verse I say, 'You say Plug 1 & 2 are hippies, no we're not, that's pure plug bull.'"

Prince Paul and Maseo sat down and came up with the idea of sampling Funkadelic's song "(Not Just) Knee Deep" for the beat of "Me Myself and I". When they played the beat to Posdnuos and Trugoy the Dove, they did not like it because the group was anti-radio and anti-establishment, but went ahead and reluctantly recorded their vocals over the beat.

Critics have situated the track within 3 Feet High and Rising’s broader collage-sample aesthetic and playful, left-of-center stance that helped define alternative rap at the turn of the 1990s.

In 2015, an unauthorized song was released digitally by Ingrooves to De La Soul. The song was titled "Me Myself and I" but it was not the track, it was Kool Keith's song "Jocking My Style" and the cover art utilized was from De La Soul Is Dead. In 2023, this song alongside another track called "Buddy (Remix)" were removed from music platforms.

== Critical reception ==
Jerry Smith from Music Week wrote, "Hot dance band of the moment, De La Soul issue this engagingly loping track from their much acclaimed album, 3 Feet High and Rising. And its strong beat and rhythmic rap is sure to take it high chartwards."

== Music video ==
The video, directed by Charles Stone III, stages the group in a satirical classroom where a disciplinarian teacher pushes rap clichés that De La Soul rejects, underscoring the song’s theme of individuality. It includes cameos by A Tribe Called Quest’s Q-Tip and Ali Shaheed Muhammad.

Ali Shaheed Muhammad and Q-Tip from A Tribe Called Quest appear in the video. Ali is the one who writes "De La Sucks" on the boys' bathroom wall and Q-Tip appears when Q-Tip says Black is Black.

== Track listing ==
#	Title	Length
United States 12" single
A1.	"Me Myself and I (Radio version)"	3:45
A2.	"Ain't Hip to Be Labeled a Hippie"	1:54
A3.	"Me Myself and I (Instrumental)"	3:35
A4.	"What's More" from the soundtrack Hell on 1st Avenue	2:10
B1.	"Me Myself and I (Oblapos Mode)"	3:38
B2.	"Me Myself and I (Oblapos Instrumental)"	3:24
C1.	"Brain Washed Follower"	3:01
European CD single
1.	"Me Myself and I (Radio version)"	3:25
2.	"Me Myself and I (Richie Rich Remix)"	7:25
3.	"Ain't Hip to Be Labeled a Hippie"	1:54
4.	"What's More" from the soundtrack Hell on 1st Avenue	2:10
5.	"Brain Washed Follower"	3:01

=== List of samples ===
"Me Myself and I"

- "(Not Just) Knee Deep" by Funkadelic (1979)
- "Rapper Dapper Snapper" by Edwin Birdsong (1980)
- "Funky Worm" by the Ohio Players (1973)
- "The Original Human Beatbox" by Doug E. Fresh (1985)
- "Gonna Make You Mine" by Loose Ends (1986)

"Ain't Hip to Be Labeled a Hippie"

- "Hard Times" by Dr. Buzzard's Original Savannah Band (1976)

"What's More"

- "You Baby" by The Turtles (1966)

"Brain-Washed Follower"

- "Funky President" by James Brown (1974)
- "You Made A Believer (Out of Me)" by Ruby Andrews (1971)
- "Booty Butt" by Ray Charles (1971)
- "So This Is Our Goodbye" by The Moments (1972)

== Charts ==
=== Weekly charts ===
Chart (1989)	Peak position
Austria (Ö3 Austria Top 40)	21
Belgium (Ultratop 50 Flanders)	7
Netherlands (Dutch Top 40)	1
Netherlands (Single Top 100)	1
Switzerland (Schweizer Hitparade)	22
UK Singles (Official Charts)	22
US Billboard Hot 100	34
US Dance Club Songs (Billboard)	1
US Dance Singles Sales (Billboard)	1
US Hot R&B/Hip-Hop Songs (Billboard)	1
US Hot Rap Songs (Billboard)	1
West Germany (GfK)	16

=== Year-end charts ===
Chart (1989)	Position
Belgium (Ultratop)	67
Netherlands (Dutch Top 40)	20
Netherlands (Single Top 100)	25
US 12-inch Singles Sales (Billboard)	3
US Dance Club Play (Billboard)	21
US Hot Black Singles (Billboard)	12
US Hot Rap Singles (Billboard)	2
West Germany (Media Control)	87

== Certifications ==
Region	Certification	Certified units/sales
United States (RIAA)	Gold	500,000^{^}
^{^} Shipments figures based on certification alone.

== Compilation appearances ==
- All That "Hip Hop" (2005)
