= Vincent Mason =

Vincent Mason may refer to:

- Vincent Mason (singer), American country singer-songwriter and guitarist
- Vincent Mason (rapper), American rapper, producer, and DJ
