= 3 Feet High and Rising =

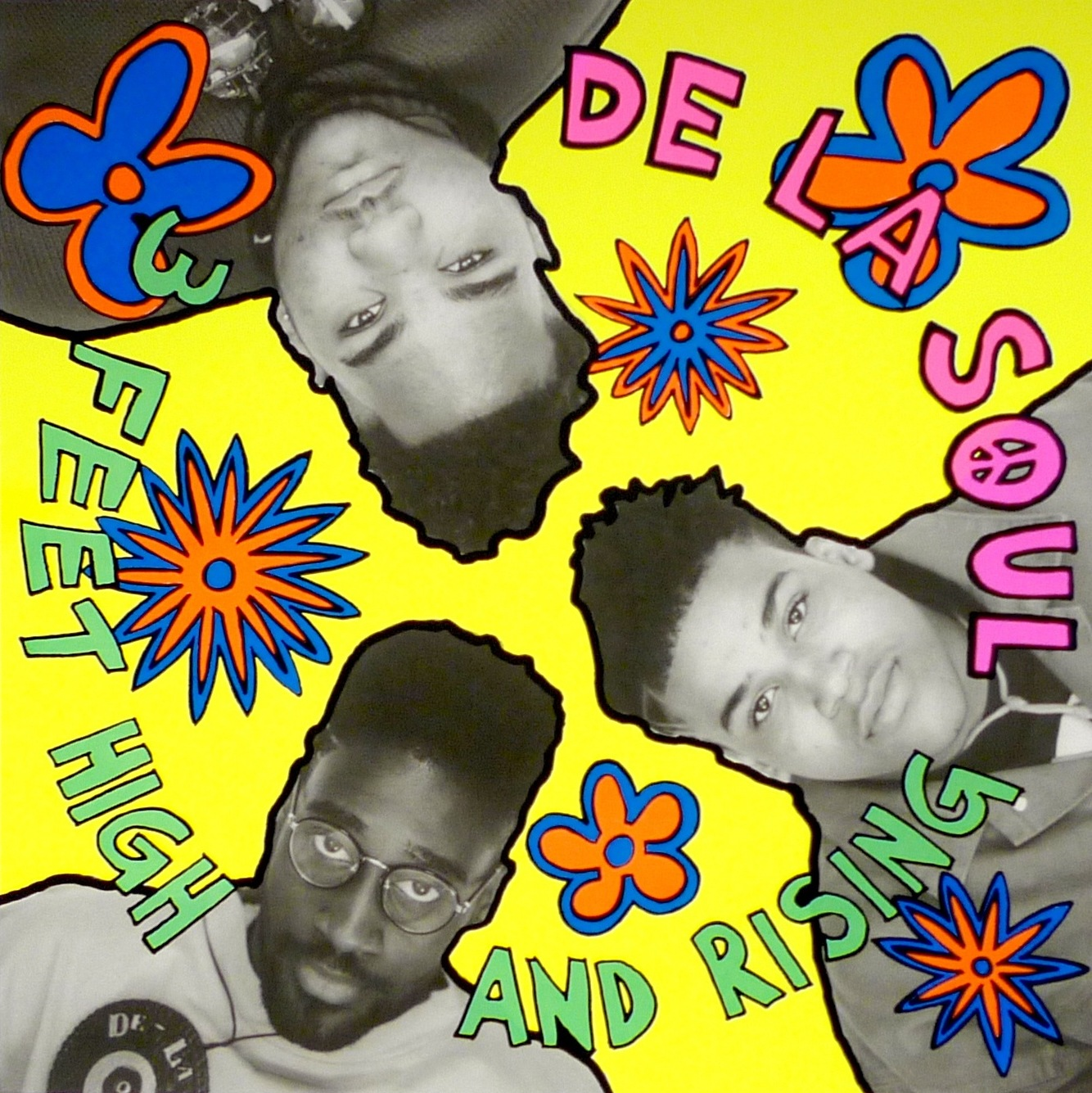

Studio album by De La Soul
- Released: February 6, 1989
- Studios: Calliope (New York City); Island Media (West Babylon, New York)
- Genres: Art rap; progressive rap; jazz rap; psychedelic hip hop; sampledelia
- Length: 67:24
- Label: Tommy Boy
- Producer: Prince Paul

De La Soul chronology
3 Feet High and Rising (1989)	De La Soul Is Dead (1991)

Singles from 3 Feet High and Rising
- 1. "Plug Tunin'" Released: June 1988; 2. "Potholes in My Lawn" Released: November 1988; 3. "Buddy" Released: December 11, 1988; 4. "Me Myself and I" Released: March 21, 1989; 5. "Say No Go" Released: August 24, 1989; 6. "Eye Know" Released: September 1989; 7. "The Magic Number" Released: December 11, 1989; 8. "Tread Water" Released: 1990

3 Feet High and Rising is the debut studio album by the American hip hop group De La Soul, released on February 6, 1989, by Tommy Boy Records. It is the first of three collaborations with the producer Prince Paul, and was the critical and commercial peak of both parties. The album title comes from the Johnny Cash song "Five Feet High and Rising". The album contains the singles "Me Myself and I", "The Magic Number", "Buddy", and "Eye Know".

The album was a critical and commercial success. It is consistently placed on lists of the greatest albums of all time by noted critics and publications, with Robert Christgau calling it "unlike any rap album you or anybody else has ever heard". In 1998, it was selected as one of The Source's "100 Best Rap Albums" and in 2020 was ranked 103 on Rolling Stone's 500 Greatest Albums of All Time list. It was selected by the Library of Congress as a 2010 addition to the National Recording Registry, which selects recordings annually that are "culturally, historically, or aesthetically significant". As of 2025, it is the only De La Soul album to be certified platinum by the RIAA.

Along with the rest of De La Soul's back catalog, 3 Feet High and Rising was not made available for digital purchase or streaming until 2023, due to concerns about the legality of the samples for digital releases.

== Musical style ==
Released amid the late-1980s boom in gangsta rap, which gravitated towards hardcore, confrontational, violent lyrics, 3 Feet High and Rising stood out from this trend by showcasing De La Soul's more positive style. The mirth and intelligence of De La Soul's self-presentation led many observers to label them a "hippie" group, a characterization that De La Soul's members have consistently disputed. On the album, De La Soul sought to explicitly distance themselves from gangsta rap by "lampoon[ing] emerging tropes" such as the growing materialism within the genre. Their lyrics are instead characterized by a variety of "bizarre and surreal" choices of subject matter, such as dandruff, gardening metaphors, and "Dr. Dolittle-esque interactions with animals".

The album features a recurring lyrical motif of the "D.A.I.S.Y. Age", an acronym that stands for "Da Inner Sound, Y'all". Group member Posdnuos has described the daisy motif as intended to indicate the group's "sunnier", more playful ethos.

3 Feet High and Rising uses a sample-heavy production style; in addition to sampling from funk and soul tracks, as was popular in the hip-hop of the era, the album also draws from sources such as doo-wop, psychedelic rock, and children's music. It has been described as "the first psychedelic hip-hop record". The album has also been noted for its use of unconventional song structures. Posdnuos recounts that the group used Casio's RZ-1 drum machine and an Eventide Harmonizer to record, manipulate, and combine their samples on the album.

The album is also known for its quiz show-themed series of skits, leading it to be frequently credited with inventing or popularizing the hip-hop skit.

== Artwork ==
The album's artwork was designed by Toby Mott of the British art collective the Grey Organisation (GO), who had relocated to New York City after their attack on Cork Street's art galleries and subsequent prosecution.

De La Soul's "D.A.I.S.Y. Age" concept inspired the design of the album cover, as Mott describes in his essay "Hip Hop in The Daisy Age":

We have come up with the 'Daisy Age' visual concept. De La Soul visit our loft where we lay them down on the floor facing up, their heads making a triangle. We photograph them whilst hanging precariously off a step ladder, one idea being that the cover would not have a right way up. CD's [sic] have yet to be the dominant musical format so the vinyl album sleeve is our most effective way of making a statement. We layer the brightly-coloured hand drawn flower designs made with Posca paint pens on acetate over the black and white photographic portrait print, which is rostrum camera copied. This is well before the time of Apple Macs and scanning etc. [...] The intent of the design of De La Soul's, 3 Feet High and Rising LP cover is to be new and bright, with the overlaying of the fluorescent flowers and text reflecting a synthetic pop cartoon look [...] This is a move away from the prevailing macho hip hop visual codes which dominate to this day.

Group member Trugoy has stated that De La Soul was not originally interested in the flower-adorned cover that the album ultimately featured; instead, he said the group had wanted an album cover that featured "an elevator halfway up with just our faces".

== Reception and influence ==
Professional ratings
Review scores
Source	Rating
AllMusic	5/5 stars
Daily News	3.5/4 stars
NME	10/10
Pitchfork	10/10
Record Mirror	5/5
Rolling Stone	3/5 stars
The Rolling Stone Album Guide	5/5 stars
Spin Alternative Record Guide	9/10
Uncut	5/5 stars
The Village Voice	A−

3 Feet High and Rising received widespread critical acclaim upon its release. "An inevitable development in the class history of rap, [De La Soul is] new wave to Public Enemy's punk", wrote Robert Christgau of the album in his 1989 "Consumer Guide" column for The Village Voice. "Their music is maddeningly disjunct, and a few of the 24-cuts-in-67-minutes (too long for vinyl) are self-indulgent, arch. But their music is also radically unlike any rap you or anybody else has ever heard — inspirations include the Jarmels and a learn-it-yourself French record. And for all their kiddie consciousness, junk-culture arcana, and suburban in-jokes, they're in the new tradition – you can dance to them, which counts for plenty when disjunction is your problem." Rolling Stone's Michael Azerrad called 3 Feet High and Rising "(o)ne of the most original rap records ever to come down the pike", and described it as an "inventive, playful" record which "stands staid rap conventions on their def ear". When The Village Voice held its annual Pazz & Jop critics' poll for 1989, 3 Feet High and Rising was ranked at number one, outdistancing its nearest opponent (Neil Young's Freedom) by 21 votes and 260 points.

Sampling artists as diverse as Johnny Cash, Hall & Oates, Steely Dan and the Turtles, 3 Feet High and Rising is often viewed as the stylistic beginning of 1990s alternative hip hop (and especially jazz rap). Writing in retrospect for The A.V. Club, Nathan Rabin credits Prince Paul for helping "create progressive hip hop" with his production on 3 Feet High and Rising, while author John Riordan says "its comedy skits and positive lyrics established the group as a progressive hip-hop act at odds with the increasingly violent image of mainstream rap." Phil Witmer of Noisey cites De La Soul's "sampledelia" on the album as an "old-school" example of sampling being applied to "jarring, collage-like effect". 3 Feet High and Rising is also credited with introducing the hip hop skit, a style of comedic sketch used both to introduce rap albums and as interludes between songs.

On the Billboard charts, 3 Feet High and Rising peaked at No. 1 on the R&B/Hip Hop charts and No. 24 in the Top 200.

=== Retrospective opinion ===
3 Feet High and Rising has been included on numerous "best-of" lists. In 1998, the album was included in The Source's "100 Best Albums" list. It was ranked number 346 on Rolling Stone's 2003 list of the "500 Greatest Albums of All Time", maintaining the ranking in a 2012 revision of the list, then rising to number 103 in a 2020 revision. 3 Feet High and Rising was voted number 138 in the 2000 edition of Colin Larkin's All Time Top 1000 Albums, while in 2005, it ranked 88th in a survey held by British television's Channel 4 to determine the 100 greatest albums of all time. The album was also included in the book 1001 Albums You Must Hear Before You Die.

In 2006, Q magazine placed the album at No. 20 in its list of "40 Best Albums of the '80s". In 2012, Slant Magazine listed the album at No. 9 on its list of "Best Albums of the 1980s". Spex listed 3 Feet High and Rising at No. 5 on its list of the Top 100 Albums of the Century. The album has also been ranked as among the top albums of 1989 by publications including Rolling Stone, The Face, Record Mirror, Sounds, OOR, and Melody Maker.

An NPR retrospective, published in 2023, stated that 3 Feet High and Rising "reshaped the public imagination of what hip-hop could be", and that it "still sounds wondrous and weird" in the musical landscape of the 2020s.

Electronica artist James Lavelle cited 3 Feet High and Rising as one of his favorite albums. "It was definitely a reaction to the slightly more hardcore area of what was going on in hip hop. As a concept record, it's probably one of the best ever. It's like the Pink Floyd of hip hop, their Dark Side of the Moon – the way it musically and sonically moves around, but also the use of language was so unusual and out there."

Macy Gray felt it was "the best record of the past 15 years" in Q, describing De La Soul as "like the Beatles of hip hop". The Village Voice described 3 Feet High and Rising as "the Sgt. Pepper of hip hop".

In 2011, 3 Feet High and Rising was among 25 albums chosen as additions to the Library of Congress' 2010 National Recording Registry for being cultural and aesthetical and also for its historical impact.

America's recorded-sound heritage has in many ways transformed the soundscape of the modern world, resonating and flowing through our cultural memory, audio recordings have documented our lives and allowed us to share artistic expressions and entertainment. Songs, words, and the natural sounds of the world that we live in have been captured on one of the most perishable of all of our art media. The salient question is not whether we should preserve these artifacts, but how best collectively to save this indispensable part of our history.

— James H. Billington from the Library of Congress

The track "The Magic Number" was used in the end credits of the 2021 film Spider-Man: No Way Home as a reference to the three iterations of Peter Parker that appear in the film. The song also appeared in the menu of the 2025 video game MLB The Show 25, and in the game's intro.

== Digital release ==
3 Feet High and Rising, along with the rest of De La Soul's catalogue up until their 2004 release, The Grind Date, was not made available for digital purchase or streaming until March 3, 2023, due to concerns about the legality of the samples for digital releases. Tommy Boy enlisted the music licensing company DMG Clearances to secure clearance for the samples, but talks failed with many of the copyright holders, as they were reticent to become involved with ongoing conflicts between De La Soul and Tommy Boy. After Tommy Boy was acquired by Reservoir Media, DMG Clearances restarted talks in January 2022 and negotiated licenses for most of the samples. De La Soul interpolated or replayed samples that could not be cleared.

An instance of a track being altered for the album's streaming release is "Cool Breeze on the Rocks", which was replaced with "Cool Breeze on the Rocks (The Melted Version)". Whereas the original was a 48-second collage of dozens of samples in which the word "rock" is used followed by part of the quiz show skit that appears throughout the album, the "Melted Version" is only 18 seconds long, and the collage is replaced with the sound of a record being spun very fast (as if fast forwarding), followed by the quiz show skit. In 2009, Trugoy said of "Cool Breeze on the Rocks", "We weren’t thinking legalities at that time. We were just thinking about putting good music together, and although there was a process — even at that time, we did have clear samples, and turn in information — but our label didn’t think that really had to clear the samples because they only expected the album to sell a couple of thousand anyway."

== Track listing ==
All tracks are written by Kelvin Mercer, David Jolicoeur, Vincent Mason, and Paul Huston, with additional writers noted. All tracks are produced by Prince Paul and De La Soul, except "Jenifa Taught Me (Derwin's Revenge)", additionally produced by Michael Fossenkemper, and "Description", additionally produced by Q-Tip.

3 Feet High and Rising track listing
No.	Title	Writer(s)	Length
1.	"Intro"	Al Watts	1:41
2.	"The Magic Number"	Robert Dorough; James Brown; Johnny Cash	3:16
3.	"Change in Speak"	Patrick Patterson; Steve Scipio; Estelle Axton; Randle Catron; Linda Andrews; Willia Parker	2:33
4.	"Cool Breeze on the Rocks"		0:48
5.	"Can U Keep a Secret"	Tony Churchill; James Baker; Robin Russell; Austin Lander; Robert Jackson; Leroy Taylor; Charlie Hearndon; Leslie Wilson; Melvin Wilson; Londee Wiggins; Allen Frey	1:41
6.	"Jenifa Taught Me (Derwin's Revenge)"	Bob Crewe; Sandy Linzer; Denny Randell; Brown	3:25
7.	"Ghetto Thang"	Kevin Toney; Keith Killgo; Joe Hall; Orville Saunders; Stephen Johnson	3:36
8.	"Transmitting Live from Mars"		1:12
9.	"Eye Know"	Otis Redding; Steve Cropper; Walter Becker; Donald Fagen; Booker T. Jones; John Gary Williams	4:13
10.	"Take It Off"		1:53
11.	"A Little Bit of Soap"	Ahmet Ertegun; Betty Nelson; Bert Berns	0:57
12.	"Tread Water"	Frank Brunson	3:46
13.	"Potholes in My Lawn"	Sylvester Allen; Harold Ray Brown; B.B. Dickerson; Lonnie Jordan; Charles Miller; Lee Oskar; Howard E. Scott; Jerry Goldstein; Ruth Copeland	3:50
14.	"Say No Go"	Daryl Hall; John Oates; Sara Allen; Abrim Tilmon; Scipio	4:20
15.	"Do as De La Does"		2:12
16.	"Plug Tunin' (Last Chance to Comprehend)"	Linzer; Randell; Crewe; Manzel Bush	4:07
17.	"De La Orgee"		1:14
18.	"Buddy" (featuring Jungle Brothers and Q-Tip)	Nathaniel Hall; Michael Hall; Jonathan Davis; Lionel Richie; Thomas McClary; Odetta Gordon; Tyrone Armstrong; Ray Smith; Malik Taylor; Simone Johnson; Eddie Harris; Yvonne Harris; Lolita Harris	4:55
19.	"Description"	Sylvester Stewart; Bush	1:32
20.	"Me Myself and I"	George Clinton; Philippé Wynne; Edwin Birdsong	3:50
21.	"This Is a Recording 4 Living in a Fulltime Era (L.I.F.E.)"	George Godfrey; Jerry Barnes; Katreese Barnes; Sal Abbatiello; Joseph Saddler	3:10
22.	"I Can Do Anything (Delacratic)"		0:41
23.	"D.A.I.S.Y. Age"	Felix Cavaliere; Eddie Brigati	4:43
24.	"Plug Tunin'" (Original 12" version)		3:43

Track listing notes:

- On the original issues, "Plug Tunin' (Original 12" version)" is exclusive to CD releases; UK releases move "Potholes in My Lawn" to the final track.
- Some copies of the bonus disc reissue contain "The Magic Number (Chad Jackson Hip Hop Version)" as track 15 on disc two.
- Otis Redding is only credited as a featured artist on "Eye Know" on 2023 digital releases.
- Songwriting credits sourced from 2023 digital release; original release only officially credited sampled artists as songwriters for "Change in Speak" (Patterson & Scipio), "Eye Know" (Becker & Fagen), "Say No Go" (Hall, Oates, & Allen), and "Me Myself & I" (Clinton & Wynne)
- The 2023 reissue replaces "Cool Breeze on the Rocks" with "Cool Breeze on the Rocks (The Melted Version)", which substitutes the sample collage with a tape winding sound, reducing it to a run time of 0:17.

== Personnel ==
Information taken from AllMusic.

- De La Soul – arrangers, production assistance
- Prince Paul – arranger, mixing, production
- Trugoy the Dove – arranger
- Al Watts – mixing, engineer, game show host
- Sue Fisher – engineer
- Bob Coulter – engineer
- Dan Miller – engineer
- Greg Arnold – assistant engineer
- Steven Miglio – layout design
- Jungle Brothers – performer
- Q-Tip – performer

== Charts ==
=== Weekly charts ===
1989 weekly chart performance for 3 Feet High and Rising
Chart (1989)	Peak position
Australian Albums (ARIA)	129
Dutch Albums (Album Top 100)	20
New Zealand Albums (RMNZ)	28
UK Albums (Official Charts)	13
US Billboard 200	24
US Top R&B/Hip-Hop Albums (Billboard)	1

2007 weekly chart performance for 3 Feet High and Rising
Chart (2007)	Peak position
Spanish Albums (Promusicae)	65

2023 weekly chart performance for 3 Feet High and Rising
Chart (2023)	Peak position
Belgian Albums (Ultratop Flanders)	74
Belgian Albums (Ultratop Wallonia)	121
German Albums (Offizielle Top 100)	22
Japanese Hot Albums (Billboard Japan)	95
Scottish Albums (Official Charts)	4
Swiss Albums (Schweizer Hitparade)	80
UK Albums (Official Charts)	9
UK Independent Albums (Official Charts)	1
UK R&B Albums (Official Charts)	1
US Billboard 200	15

=== Year-end charts ===
1989 year-end chart performance for 3 Feet High and Rising
Chart (1989)	Position
UK Albums (OCC)	68
US Billboard 200	86
US Top R&B/Hip-Hop Albums (Billboard)	17

== Certifications ==
Certifications for 3 Feet High and Rising
Region	Certification	Certified units/sales
United Kingdom (BPI)	Platinum	300,000^{^}
United States (RIAA)	Platinum	1,000,000^{^}
^{^} Shipments figures based on certification alone.

== See also ==
- List of Billboard number-one R&B albums of 1989
