= DMG Clearances =

Music licensor in Delaware, USA

DMG Clearances, Inc is a company based in Hockessin, Delaware, USA, which handles music clearances and licensing for the entertainment industry. DMG Clearances was founded in 1996 by Deborah Mannis-Gardner.

The company clears musical compositions for use in films, video games, sampling and Broadway Theater. Clients include Drake, Eminem, De La Soul, Rihanna, Beyoncé, Coen Brothers, Martin Scorsese, Rockstar Games and The Roots.

In 2023, the American hip-hop group De La Soul partnered with DMG in order to clear the samples on their back catalogue before their digital release.

== Deborah Mannis-Gardner ==
Deborah Mannis-Gardner is a graduate of Emerson College and began her career in the entertainment industry working on music videos and providing television clearances in New York City in 1989. Mannis-Gardner went into the business of sample clearances for hip hop music in 1992 with a UK business partner. In 1996, she created DMG Clearances to focus on sample clearances and music placement.

Regarding the state of music sampling, Mannis-Gardner has always considered it an art. "I think sampling is an art and I think it's incredible. When I first started, I was told how it was theft. I was told that hip-hop and rap was a phase. That it wasn't going to be around. All of that horrible, negative stuff. I kept saying "well, a collage, that's not real art? Jambalaya isn't real food?" That's a great meal mixed up of different foods and spices, that's what sampling is."

== Awards ==
The New Castle County Chamber of Commerce named Mannis-Gardner the 2016 Entrepreneurial Woman of the Year.

== DMG credits ==
=== Film ===
Source: IMDb

- 1997 A Life Less Ordinary (music clearances - as Debra Mannis-Gardner)
- 1997 Kiss Me, Guido (music clearances)
- 1998 Velvet Goldmine (music coordinator - as Debra Mannis-Gardner)
- 1999 Dogma (music coordinator - as Debra Mannis-Gardner)
- 1999 She's All That (music coordinator - as Debra Mannis-Gardner)
- 2000 O Brother, Where Art Thou? (music clearances)
- 2001 How High (music co-ordinator - as Debra Mannis-Gardner)
- 2002 8 Mile (music clearance)
- 2002 xXx (music coordinator - as Debra Mannis-Gardner)
- 2003 The Fighting Temptations (music co-ordinator - as Debra Mannis-Gardner)
- 2003 School of Rock (music co-ordinator - as Debra Mannis-Gardner)
- 2004 White Chicks (music co-ordinator - as Debra Mannis-Gardner)
- 2005 In Her Shoes (music clearances)
- 2005 xXx: State of the Union (music clearances)
- 2005 Are We There Yet? (music clearance / music co-ordinator - as Debra Mannis-Gardner)
- 2006 Rocky Balboa (music clearance)
- 2006 Littleman (music co-ordinator - as Debra Mannis-Gardner)
- 2006 Take the Lead (music clearances)
- 2007 Lucky You (music co-ordinator - as Debra Mannis-Gardner)
- 2007 Are We Done Yet? (music co-ordinator - as Debra Mannis-Gardner)
- 2008 The Accidental Husband (music co-ordinator - as Debra Mannis-Gardner)
- 2012 Hip Hop Cultural Odyssey: Know Your History (TV movie documentary) (music clearance - as Debra Mannis-Gardner)
- 2012 Be Inspired: The Life of Heavy D (documentary short) (music clearances - as Deborah Mannis-Gardner)
- 2012 Independent Lens (TV series documentary) (music clearance - 1 episode)
- 2014 Free the Nipple (music supervisor - as Debra Mannis-Gardner)
- 2016 Southside with You (music licensing)

=== Music ===
Source: Artist Direct

- 1997 Forest for the Trees - Forest for the Trees (sample clearance)
- 1997 Kiss Me Guido (project co-ordinator)
- 1997 Pop - U2 (sample clearance)
- 1998 Men with Guns (Hombres Armados) [Rykodisc] (music clearance)
- 1999 Classic Limited Edition - Made Men (sample clearance)
- 1999 Life Story - Black Rob (sample clearance)
- 2000 Old School - Next Friday(music clearance)
- 2001 Forever - TKA (sample clearance)
- 2001 Jealous Ones Still Envy (J.O.S.E.) - Fat Joe (sample clearance)
- 2002 El Cool Magnifico - Coolio (sample clearance)
- 2002 It Ain't Safe No More - Busta Rhymes (sample clearance)
- 2002 Loyalty Fat Joe (sample clearance)
- 2003 Almost Famous - Lumidee (sample clearance)
- 2003 Blood in My Eye - Ja Rule (sample clearance)
- 2003 Chicken-N-Beer - Ludacris (sample clearance)
- 2003 Grand Champ - DMX (sample clearance)
- 2004 Concrete Rose - Ashanti (sample clearance)
- 2004 Encore - Eminem (sample clearance)
- 2004 Godfather Buried Alive - Shyne (sample clearance)
- 2004 Hell and Back - Drag-On (sample clearance)
- 2004 Kiss of Death - Jadakiss (sample clearance)
- 2004 Lyfe 268-192 - Lyfe Jennings (sample clearance)
- 2004 R&G (Rhythm & Gangsta): The Masterpiece - Snoop Dogg (sample clearance)
- 2004 Southside - Lloyd (sample clearance)
- 2004 The Pretty Toney Album - Ghostface Killah (sample clearance)
- 2004 The Red Light District - Ludacris (sample clearance)
- 2004 Tical 0: The Prequel - Method Man (sample clearance)
- 2004 Urban Legend - T.I. (sample clearance)
- 2004 White Trash Beautiful - Everlast (sample clearance)
- 2004 Will & Grace: Let the Music Out! (sample clearance)
- 2005 As Is. [CD & DVD] - Tocka (sample clearance)
- 2005 Collectables by Ashanti - Ashanti (sample clearance)
- 2005 Disturbing tha Peace - Disturbing tha Peace / Ludacris (sample clearance)
- 2005 Roc-a-Fella Records Presents Teairra Marí - Teairra Marí (sample clearance)
- 2005 That One Way - Czar*Nok / Max Julien (sample clearance)
- 2005 The Anger Management Tour [DVD] (sample clearance)
- 2005 The Black Rob Report - Black Rob (sample clearance)
- 2005 The East Village Opera Company - The East Village Opera Company (sample clearance)
- 2005 The Naked Truth - Lil' Kim (musician)
- 2005 The Redemption, Vol. 4 - Ruff Ryders (sample clearance)
- 2005 Welcome to Jamrock - Damian "Junior Gong" Marley (sample clearance)
- 2006 A Girl Like Me - Rihanna (sample clearance)
- 2006 Bred 2 Die Born 2 Live - Lil Scrappy (sample clearance)
- 2006 Eminem Presents: The Re-Up - Eminem (sample clearance)
- 2006 Food & Liquor - Lupe Fiasco (design)
- 2006 Hoodstar - Chingy (sample clearance)
- 2006 More Fish - Ghostface Killah (sample clearance)
- 2006 N.O.R.E. y la Familia...Ya Tú Sabe - N.O.R.E. (sample clearance)
- 2006 Point of No Return - Shareefa (sample clearance)
- 2006 Press Play - Diddy / P. Diddy (sample clearance)
- 2006 Tha Blue Carpet Treatment - Snoop Dogg (sample clearance)
- 2006 Time Is Money - Styles P (sample clearance)
- 2006 Year of the Dog...Again - DMX (sample clearance)
- 2007 Baby Makin' Project - agged Edge (sample clearance)
- 2007 Good Girl Gone Bad - Rihanna (sample clearance)
- 2007 Hate It or Love It - Chingy (sample clearance)
- 2007 Red Gone Wild: Thee Album - Redman (sample clearance)
- 2007 Special Occasion - Bobby V (sample clearance)
- 2007 Supply & Demand - Playaz Circle (sample clearance)
- 2007 The Big Doe Rehab - Ghostface Killah (sample clearance)
- 2007 The Cool - Lupe Fiasco (sample clearance)
- 2008 Gutta - Ace Hood (sample clearance)
- 2008 Nas - Nas (sample clearance)
- 2008 Plastic Starfish - Tal M. Klein (sample clearance)
- 2008 Rising Down - The Roots (sample clearance)
- 2009 8dazeaweakend - Dallas Austin / Dallas Austin Experience (sample clearance)
- 2009 Blackout! Vol. 2 - Method Man / Redman (sample clearance)
- 2009 Certified - Unladylike (sample clearance)
- 2009 Deeper Than Rap - Rick Ross (sample clearance)
- 2009 Flight 360: The Takeoff - Playaz Circle (sample clearance)
- 2009 Loso's Way - Fabolous (sample clearance)
- 2009 Malice N Wonderland - Snoop Dogg (sample clearance)
- 2009 Memoirs of an Imperfect Angel - Mariah Carey (sample clearance)
- 2009 Notorious (original soundtrack) (sample clearance)
- 2009 Rated R - Rihanna (sample clearance)
- 2009 Relapse - Eminem (sample clearance)
- 2009 Relapse: Refill - Eminem (sample clearance)
- 2009 Ruthless - Ace Hood (sample clearance)
- 2009 Tha Connect - Willy Northpole (sample clearance)
- 2009 The Boss of All Bosses - Slim Thug (sample clearance)
- 2009 The Last Kiss - Jadakiss (sample clearance)
- 2009 Ultraviolet - Kid Sister (sample clearance)
- 2010 Apollo Kids - Ghostface Killah (sample clearance)
- 2010 Battle of the Sexes - Ludacris (sample clearance)
- 2010 Crunk Rock - Lil Jon (sample clearance)
- 2010 Donnie G: Don Gorilla - Sheek Louch (sample clearance)
- 2010 How I Got Over - The Roots (sample clearance)
- 2010 Loud - Rihanna (sample clearance)
- 2010 More Malice - Snoop Dogg (sample clearance)
- 2010 My Soul - Leela James (sample clearance)
- 2010 Recovery - Eminem (sample clearance)
- 2010 Reggie - Redman (sample clearance)
- 2010 Rise Up - Cypress Hill (sample clearance)
- 2010 Teflon Don - Rick Ross (sample clearance)
- 2010 The Beginning - The Black Eyed Peas (sample clearance)
- 2010 The Beginning & the Best of the E.N.D. - The Black Eyed Peas (sample clearance)
- 2010 The Darkside, Vol. 1 - Fat Joe (sample clearance)
- 2010 Wu Massacre - Ghostface Killah / Method Man / Raekwon (sample clearance)
- 2011 Blood Sweat & Tears - Ace Hood (sample clearance)
- 2011 Doggumentary - Snoop Dogg (sample clearance)
- 2011 Hell: The Sequel - Bad Meets Evil (sample clearance)
- 2011 I Love You (A Dedication to My Fans): The Mixtape - Jadakiss (sample clearance)
- 2011 Lasers - Lupe Fiasco (sample clearance)
- 2011 Talk That Talk - Rihanna (sample clearance)
- 2011 Under the Mistletoe - Justin Bieber (main personnel, music clearance)
- 2011 Undun - The Roots (sample clearance)
- 2012 Food & Liquor II: The Great American Rap Album, Pt. 1 - Lupe Fiasco (sample clearance)
- 2012 God Forgives, I Don't - Rick Ross (sample clearance)
- 2012 Life Is Good - Nas (sample clearance)
- 2012 Unapologetic - Rihanna (sample clearance)
- 2012 Welcome To: Our House - Slaughterhouse (sample clearance)
- 2013 #willpower - will.i.am (sample clearance)
- 2013 B.O.A.T.S. II: #METIME - 2 Chainz (music clearance)
- 2013 Break the Pot - Rich Boy (sample clearance)
- 2013 Nothing Was the Same - Drake (sample clearance)
- 2014 ...And Then You Shoot Your Cousin - The Roots (sample clearance)
- 2014 Hood Billionaire - Rick Ross (sample clearance)
- 2014 Mastermind - Rick Ross (sample clearance)
- 2015 Black Market - Rick Ross (sample clearance)
- 2015 Fly International Luxurious Art Raekwon (sample clearance)
- 2015 Hamilton: An American Musical (original Broadway cast recording]) - Lin-Manuel Miranda (music clearance)
- 2015 Living Legend - Gunplay (sample clearance)
- 3 CD Collector's Set - Rihanna (sample clearance)
