= Baby Phat (song) =

Single by De La Soul featuring Devin and Yummy

from the album AOI: Bionix
- Released: November 6, 2001
- Recorded: 2001
- Genre: Hip hop
- Length: 3:50
- Label: Tommy Boy
- Songwriters: K. Mercer, D. Jolicoeur, V. Mason, D. West, E. Bingham, D. Copeland
- Producer: Dave West

De La Soul singles chronology
"Thru Ya City" (2001)	"Baby Phat" (2001)	"Say "I Gotta Believe!"" (2002)

Yummy Bingham singles chronology
"Baby Phat" (2001)	"Much More" (2003)

"Baby Phat" is the only official single from De La Soul's sixth studio album, AOI: Bionix, released in late 2001. The song was produced by Dave West and featured vocals from Devin the Dude and Yummy Bingham. This single was the introduction for Yummy Bingham.

The song is an ode to "plus size" women, as Devin sings "Don't get stuck on the things they say, now you know it's a nasty world / Tryin' to get with ya anyway cause I know you're a nasty girl / We ain't never gon' discriminate so let me compliment your size"

The B-side of the 12" single is "Watch Out", also produced by Dave West and featuring samples from "Mood for Milt", and "Cubano Chant" by Latin musician Cal Tjader.

The single was released as a 12" vinyl single in the United States on November 6, 2001. The CD single is a UK edition, released on February 18, 2002, and reached number 55 in UK Singles chart.

== Track listing ==
CD 1

1. "Baby Phat" (Album Version) (3:50)
  - Guest Appearances: Devin the Dude, Yummy Bingham
2. "Watch Out" (Album Version) (3:50)
3. "All Good" (Can 7 Supermarket Remix) (4:49)

CD 2

1. "Baby Phat" (Album Version) (3:50)
  - Guest Appearances: Devin the Dude, Yummy Bingham
2. "Baby Phat" (Clean Version) (3:50)
  - Guest Appearances: Devin the Dude, Yummy Bingham
3. "Baby Phat" (Video Version) (3:50)

12" release

1. "Baby Phat" (Clean) (3:50)
  - Guest Appearances: Devin the Dude, Yummy Bingham
2. "Baby Phat" (Dirty) (3:50)
  - Guest Appearances: Devin the Dude, Yummy Bingham
3. "Baby Phat" (Instrumental) (3:50)
4. "Watch Out" (Clean) (3:36)
5. "Watch Out" (Dirty) (3:36)
6. "Watch Out" (Instrumental) (3:36)
