= Vincent Mason (rapper) =

American rapper, producer, and DJ

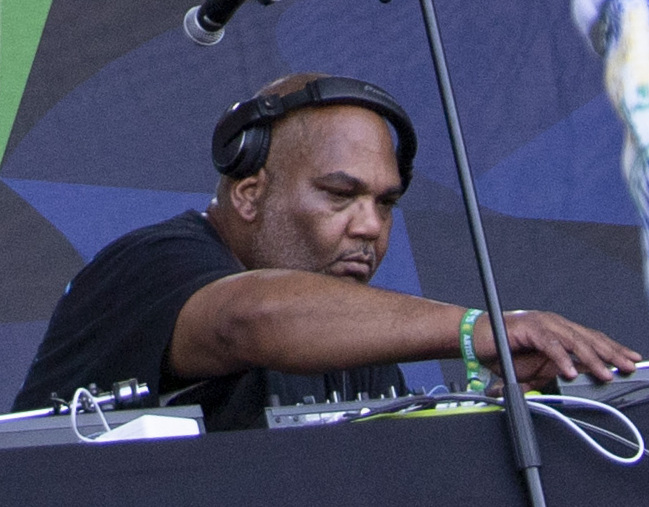
- Mason in 2025

Background information
- Also known as: Maseo; P.A.; Pasemaster Mase; Plug Three
- Born: Vincent Lamont Mason Jr. March 24, 1970 (age 56); Brooklyn, New York City, U.S.
- Origin: Long Island, New York, U.S.
- Genre: East Coast hip-hop
- Occupations: DJ; music producer; rapper
- Years active: 1988–present
- Labels: Tommy Boy; A.O.I.; Sanctuary; Kobalt
- Member of: De La Soul

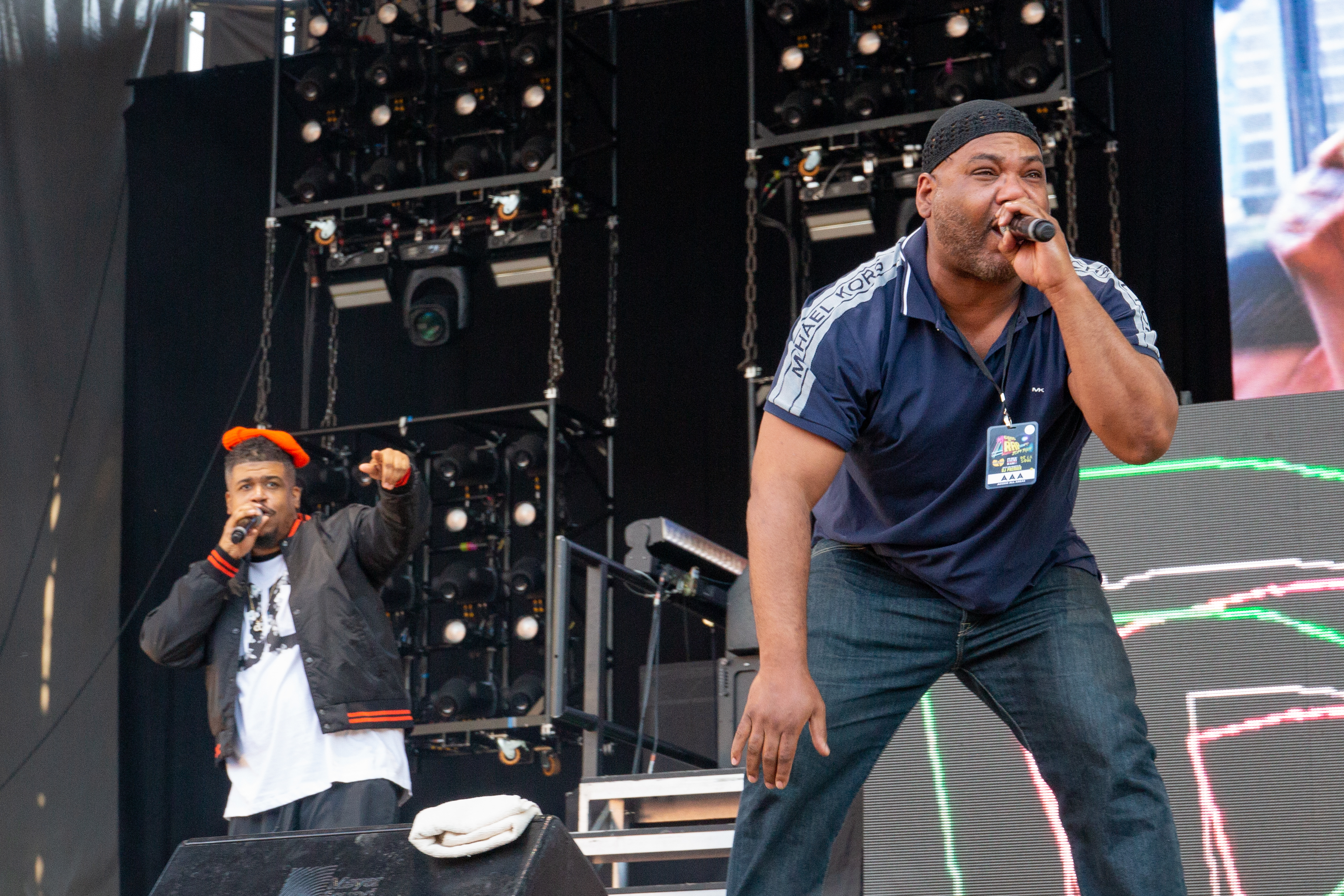
Dave and Maseo of De La Soul, Gods of Rap Tour 2019

Vincent Lamont Mason Jr. (born March 24, 1970) is an American rapper, producer and DJ who is one third of the hip-hop group De La Soul. He is also known as Maseo, P.A. Pasemaster Mase and Plug Three.

== Early life ==
Mason graduated from Amityville Memorial High School in 1988.

== Career ==
Kelvin Mercer ("Posdnuos", "Plug One", "Plug Wonder Why", "Mercenary") and David Jude Jolicoeur ("Trugoy the Dove", "Plug Two", "Dave") were already friends when Mason joined the pair to form De La Soul in 1987. The trio came to the attention of Prince Paul, then a member of Stetsasonic, with a demo recording of "Plug Tunin'". Paul facilitated a record deal for Mason and his colleagues with the Tommy Boy label and produced their first album, 3 Feet High and Rising.

Mason's role in De La Soul is primarily that of a DJ, with Mason stating that he is "a b-boy to my heart", drawing inspiration from life experience and contemporary global events. However, Mason has also featured as a vocalist on songs such as "Ring Ring Ring (Ha Ha Hey)" (from De La Soul Is Dead) and for De La Soul's guest appearance on the Jungle Brothers recording, "Doin' Our Own Dang". Mason also recorded the introductory laugh for De La Soul's collaboration with Gorillaz, "Feel Good Inc."

Mase is a member of the Spitkicker collective, a group of artistically-minded people who release work by Spitkicker artists and engage in social, community-based activism.

== Personal life ==
Mason is a native of Brooklyn, New York but grew up on Long Island where he met the other members of De La Soul. He is the son of Dorothy Robinson and Vincent Mason. He is the oldest of two siblings; his younger brother is Anthony Mason Sr. He is the father of four children: Marcus, Tre, Chauncey and Dayo Mason. His son, Tre Mason, was a running back for the St. Louis/Los Angeles Rams.

== Aliases ==
All three members of De La Soul have a variety of known aliases and nicknames used throughout the group's career. The following are the most significant:

- P.A. Pasemaster Mase – The first alias used by Mason, "Pasemaster" (or "P.A.") was used as an alternative to "DJ". Though "Mase" is simply a nickname for Mason, Mason noted in an early interview that the name can be an acronym for "Making A Soul Effort". Later, with the release of De La Soul is Dead, the nickname "Maseo" became widely used.
- Plug Three – An early concept for 3 Feet High and Rising involved music being transmitted from Mars by three microphone plugs (each one representing a member of the group). Though this idea was abandoned, the titles "Plug One", "Plug Two" and "Plug Three" still became relevant on the album.
