= Potholes in My Lawn =

Single by De La Soul

from the album 3 Feet High and Rising
- Released: November 16, 1988
- Recorded: 1988
- Genre: Alternative hip-hop
- Length: 3:46
- Label: Tommy Boy
- Songwriters: P. Huston; K. Mercer; D. Jolicoeur; V. Mason
- Producers: Prince Paul; De La Soul

De La Soul singles chronology
"Plug Tunin'" (1988)	"Potholes in My Lawn" (1988)	"Buddy" / "The Magic Number" (1988)

"Potholes in My Lawn" is the second single by American hip-hop group De La Soul, released in 1988 from their album 3 Feet High and Rising.

== Composition ==
The songs were mastered by record mixer and engineer Herb Powers Jr. The song samples "Magic Mountain" by Eric Burdon & War as well as the signature yodeling and jaw harp on Parliament's "Little Ole Country Boy" off 1970's Osmium.

== Release ==
The song was released in some territories as a double A-side with "Jenifa Taught Me (Derwin's Revenge)".

The song is notable for being the first hip-hop song to be played on Mars, by NASA's Opportunity Rover in 2004.

== Track listing ==
1. "Jenifa (Taught Me)" – 4:46
2. "Skip 2 My Loop" – 1:07
3. "Potholes in My Lawn" – 3:49
4. "They Don't Know That the Soul Don't Go for That" – 3:25
5. "Derwin" – 3:50

== Charts ==
Chart performance for "Potholes in My Lawn"
Chart (1989)	Peak position
US Hot Rap Songs (Billboard)	22
