= Buddy (De La Soul song) =

1988 song by De La Soul

Single by De La Soul featuring Q-Tip, Phife Dawg, Queen Latifah, Monie Love and Jungle Brothers

from the album 3 Feet High and Rising
- A-side: "The Magic Number"
- Released: December 11, 1989
- Recorded: 1988 (album version); 1989 (remix)
- Genre: Alternative hip-hop
- Length: 4:54 (album version); 7:17 (12" remix version)
- Label: Tommy Boy
- Songwriters: P. Huston; K. Mercer; D. Jolicoeur; V. Mason
- Producers: Prince Paul, De La Soul

De La Soul singles chronology
"Potholes In My Lawn" (1988)	"Buddy" / "The Magic Number" (1989)	"Eye Know" (1989)

Q-Tip singles chronology
"Buddy" (1989)	"One Love" (1994)

Queen Latifah singles chronology
"Buddy" (1989)	"Just Another Day..." (1993)

Monie Love singles chronology
"I Can Do This" (1988)	"Buddy" (1989)	"It's a Shame (My Sister)" (1990)

Jungle Brothers singles chronology
"Because I Got It Like That" (1988)	"Buddy" (1989)	"What 'U' Waitin' '4'?" (1990)

"Buddy" is the third single released by De La Soul from their album 3 Feet High and Rising.

== Composition ==
The song is often cited as an example of an effective remix; one that includes a change of song lyrics or beat. In this case, both the original song's lyrics and the musical bed received a makeover. With its sample of the bassline from Taana Gardner's 1981 song "Heartbeat", the 7 minute 12" version was clearly tailor-made for dancefloor and provided a striking contrast to the laid back album version.

The song was also famous for featuring the major members of the Native Tongues posse, including Q-Tip of A Tribe Called Quest, Jungle Brothers, Queen Latifah and Monie Love. While Phife Dawg appears in the video itself and is heard in the extended mix, the mix in the video eliminates his entire verse.

In 2015, an unauthorized song was released digitally with the name "Buddy (Remix)" provided by Ingrooves to De La Soul, but it was not the song or the remix, it was Kool Keith's song "Lyrical Magic".

== Music video ==
The music video for "Buddy" is introduced by Prince Paul who explains, "'Buddy' doesn't mean 'girl' or 'sex' for that matter, 'buddy' simply means 'body', bodies of all kind." While the majority of the video consists of the members of the Native Tongues posse performing straight to camera, this is interspersed with brief segments of black-and-white footage, one of which featuring a speech balloon that remarks "this video makes no sense!"

Along with those who appeared in the song, the video also featured a cameo from rapper Chi-Ali.

== Critical reception ==
In 2023, Billboard and Stereogum ranked the song number one and number three, respectively, on their lists of the 10 greatest De La Soul songs.

== Track listing ==
1. "Buddy (Native Tongue Decision)" - 7:17
  - Guest Appearances: Q-Tip, Phife Dawg, Jungle Brothers, Queen Latifah, Monie Love
2. "Buddy (Native Tongue Decision Instrumental)" - 5:50
3. "Ghetto Thang (Vocal)" - 3:45
4. "Ghetto Thang (Ghetto Ximer)" - 3:55
5. "Buddy (Vocal)" - 4:58
  - Guest Appearances: Q-Tip, Jungle Brothers
6. "Ghetto Thang (Ghetto Ximer Instrumental)" - 3:47

== Charts ==
Chart (1989–1990)	Peak Position
U.S. Billboard Hot R&B/Hip-Hop Songs	18^{1}
U.S. Billboard Hot Dance Club Play	27^{1}
U.S. Billboard Hot Rap Singles	2
U.S. Billboard Hot Dance Music/Maxi-Singles Sales	11
UK Singles Chart	7
