= David Jolicoeur =

American rapper (1968–2023)

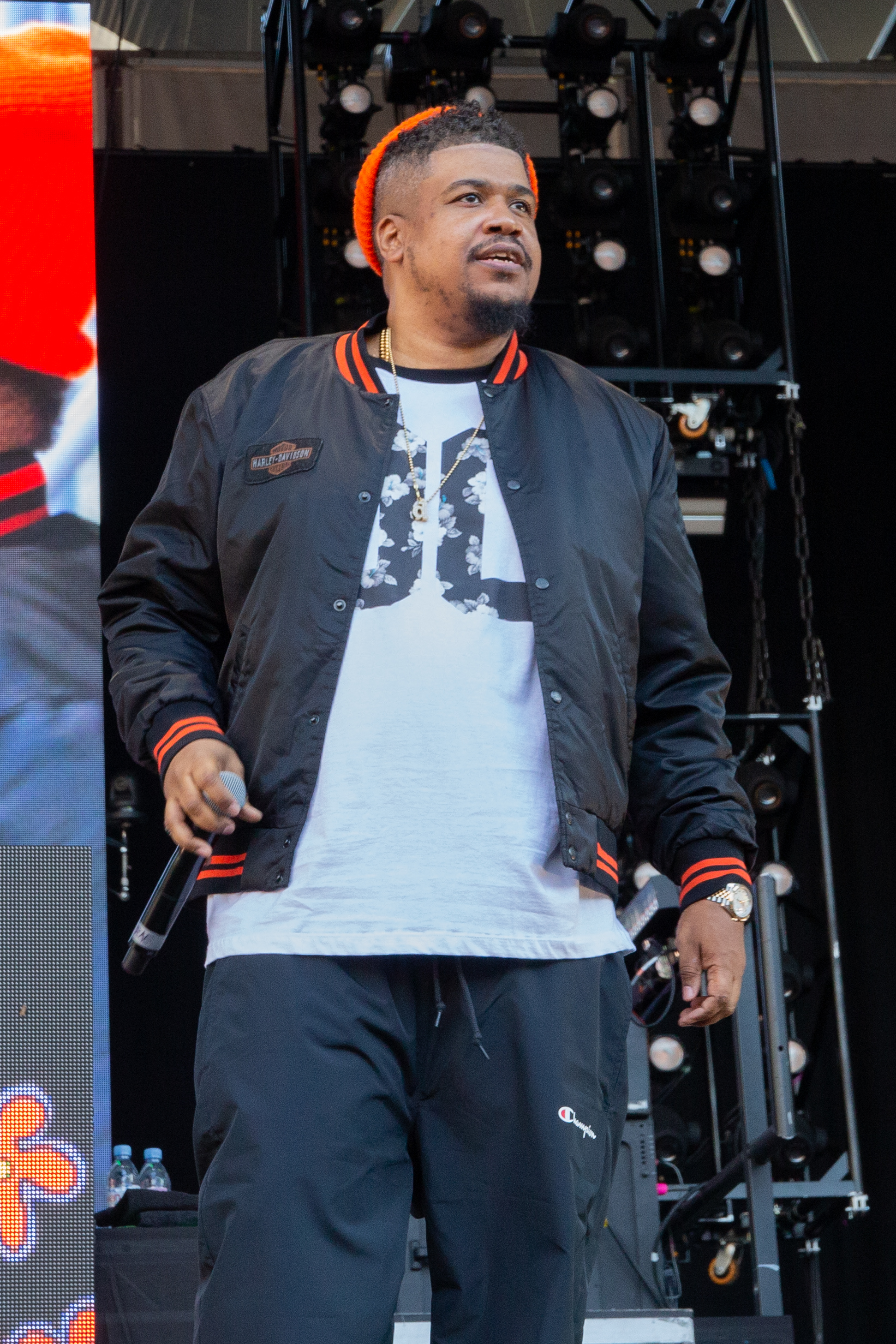
- Jolicoeur in 2019
- Born: David Jude Jolicoeur; September 21, 1968; New York City, U.S.
- Died: February 12, 2023 (aged 54)
- Other names: Trugoy the Dove; Plug Two; Dave
- Education: Amityville Memorial High School
- Occupations: Rapper; songwriter; record producer
- Years active: 1988–2023
- Musical career
- Origin: Long Island, New York, U.S.
- Genre: East Coast hip-hop
- Label: Tommy Boy
- Formerly of: De La Soul

David Jude Jolicoeur (September 21, 1968 – February 12, 2023), also known as Trugoy the Dove, Plug Two, and Dave, was an American rapper best known as one third of the hip-hop group De La Soul.

Along with the other members of De La Soul, Jolicoeur was a member of the collective Native Tongues. Jolicoeur co-wrote the Gorillaz song "Feel Good Inc.", which featured De La Soul and won a Grammy Award in 2006 for Best Pop Collaboration with Vocals.

== Early life, family and education ==
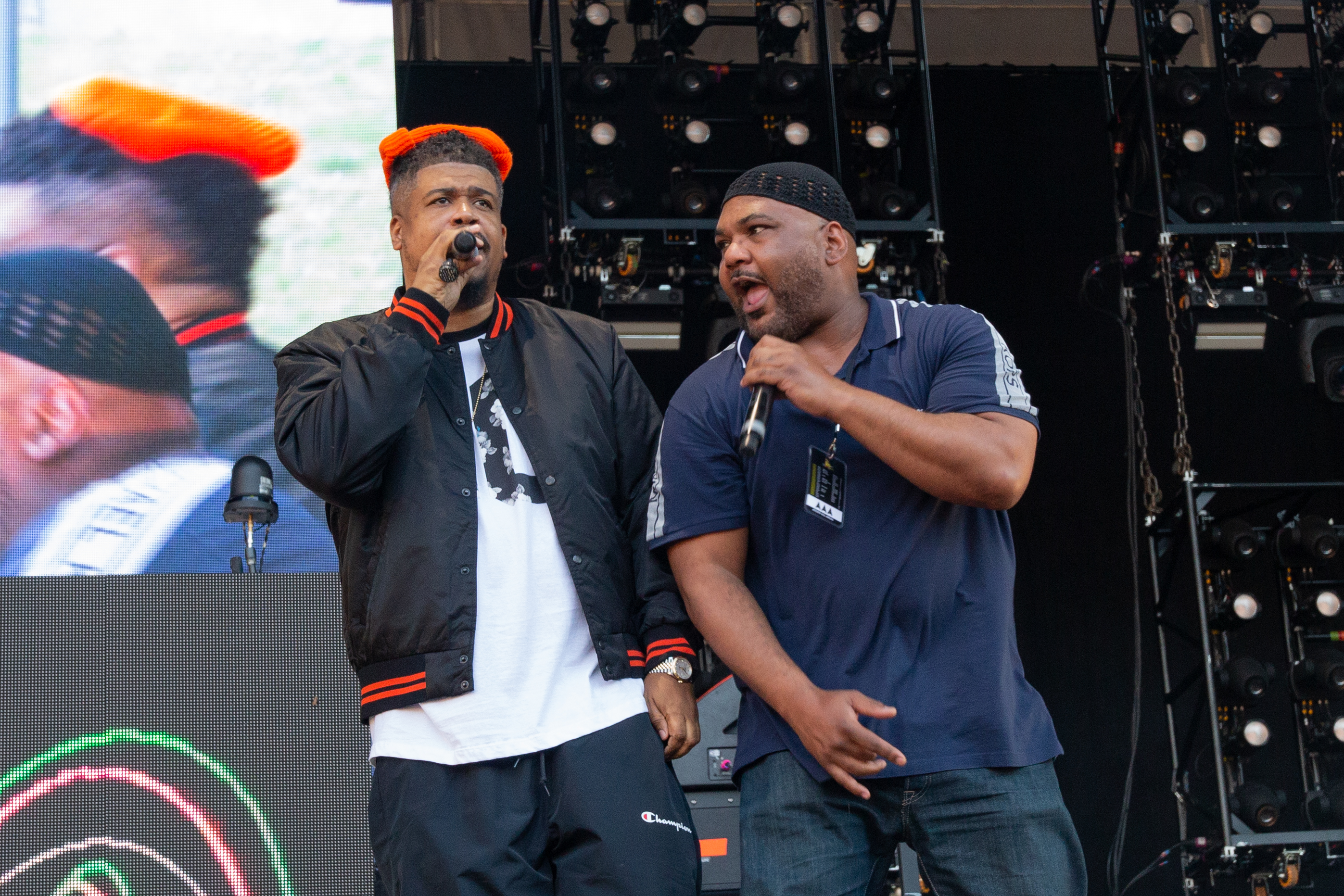
Dave and Maseo of De La Soul at Gods of Rap 2019 in Berlin

Jolicoeur was born in Brooklyn, New York City, to Haitian-American parents. He was raised in the Long Island hamlet of East Massapequa.

He attended Amityville Memorial High School in the Amityville area of Long Island.

== Career ==
In high school, Jolicoeur befriended Vincent Mason, Kelvin Mercer, and Paul Huston. After they had separate solo spells in local groups, Jolicoeur, Mason, and Mercer eventually joined together to form the rap group De La Soul. They adopted the stage names, respectively, Trugoy the Dove, Maseo, and Posdnuos. Later in his career, Jolicoeur revealed that the first part of his stage name was just the word "yogurt" backwards. Huston, best known as Prince Paul, kept working with the trio as their producer.

With their eccentric fashion styles paired with the positive messages of the group's debut effort, 3 Feet High and Rising, the image led to critics and journalists labelling the members as "the hippies of hip hop" (a title that the group was quick to refute with the release of its second album De La Soul Is Dead in 1991).

== Personal life and death ==
In the last years of his life, Jolicoeur was diagnosed with congestive heart failure and had to wear a LifeVest defibrillator machine in order to counteract its symptoms.

He first revealed his health issues publicly in November 2017, in the opening scene for the music video of "Royalty Capes", a track from De La Soul's 2016 album And the Anonymous Nobody.... At the start of the video, Jolicoeur explains how his heart problems affected his ability to perform and tour with the group consistently, saying: "[The LifeVest defibrillator] will shock me, and hopefully bring me back from the matrix. I'm ready just to get back to the stage. I miss it. I love traveling; I love being around my guys. And I want that back."

On February 5, 2023, De La Soul participated in a special performance for the 50 Years of Hip-Hop at the 65th Annual Grammy Awards, performing their 1988 song "Buddy". However, Jolicoeur did not appear or perform on stage.

One week later, on February 12, 2023, his representative Tony Ferguson announced that Jolicoeur had died at age 54, with the cause of his death remaining undisclosed. Following the announcement, Jolicoeur received tributes from several important figures in the hip hop industry.
