= Kelvin Mercer =

American rapper and producer (born 1969)

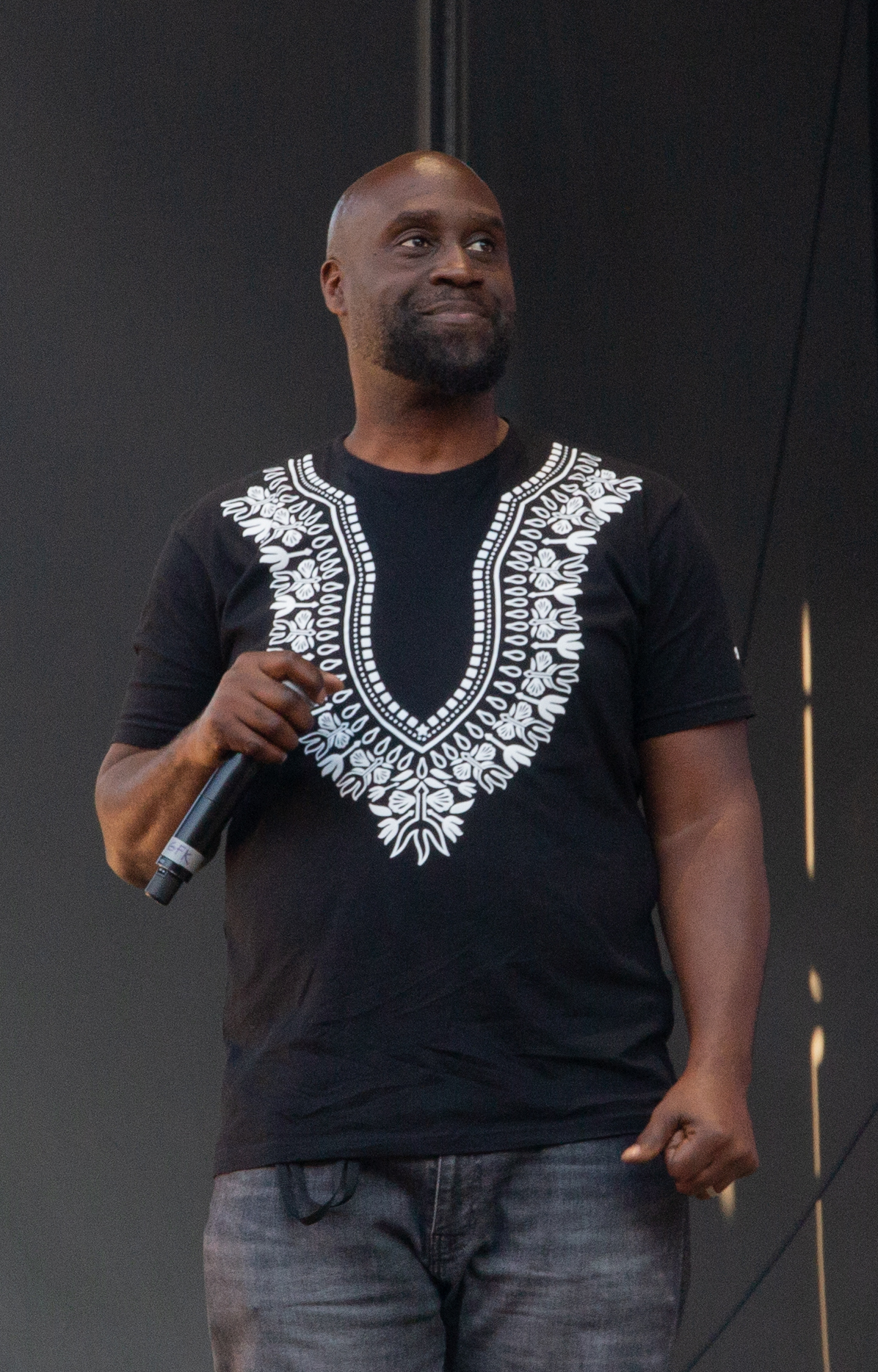
- Mercer at Gods of Rap 2019 in Berlin, Germany

Background information
- Also known as: Posdnuos; Mercenary; Plug One; Sop Sound; Plug Wonder Why; Pos
- Born: August 17, 1969 (age 57); New York City, New York, U.S.
- Genre: Hip-hop
- Occupations: Rapper, record producer
- Years active: 1988–present
- Labels: Tommy Boy, Sanctuary, AOI
- Member of: De La Soul

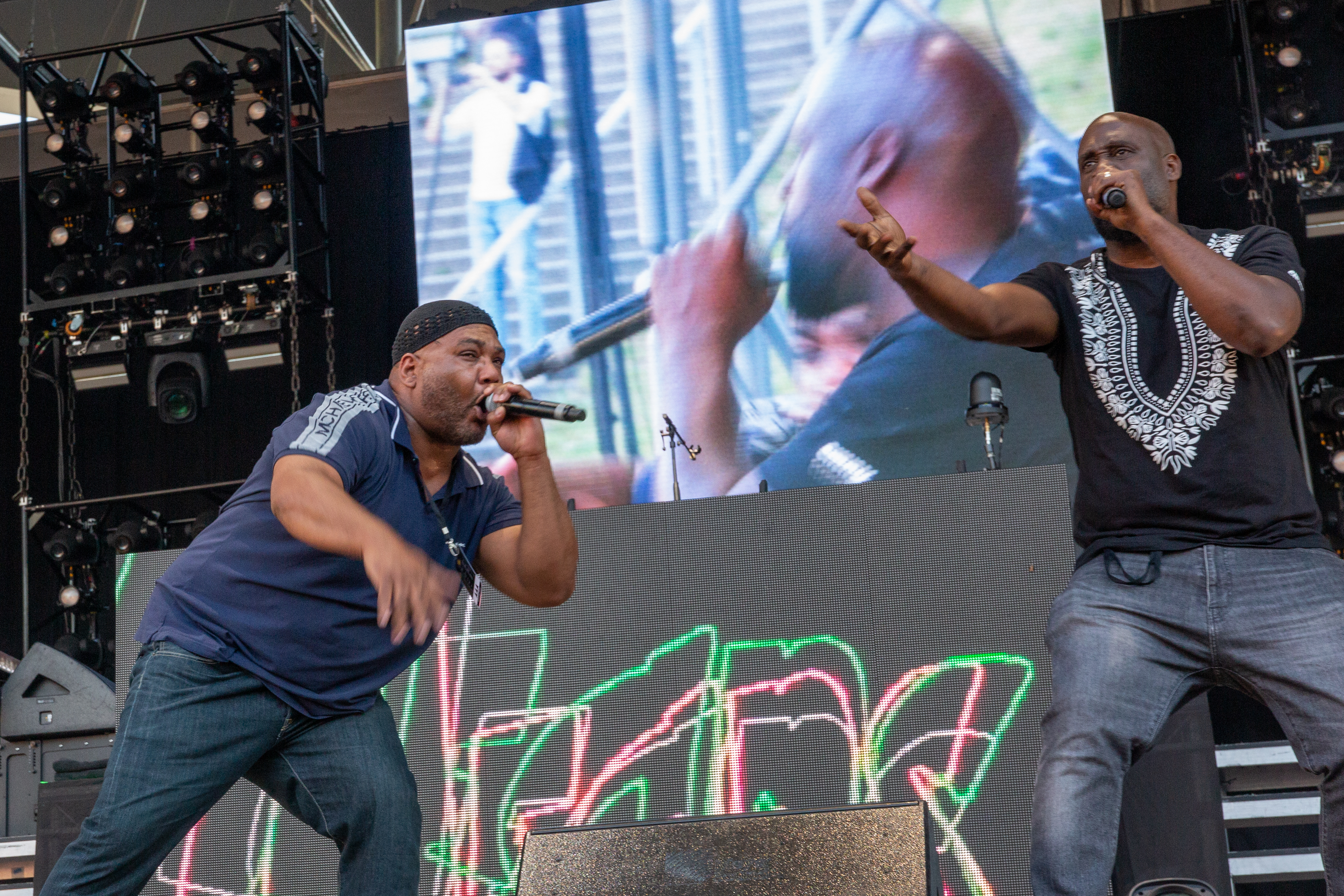
Posdnuos and Maseo of De La Soul at Gods of Rap 2019 in Berlin, Germany

Kelvin Mercer (born August 17, 1969), also known by his stage name Posdnuos, Plug 1 and occasionally Pos, is an American rapper and record producer from East Massapequa, New York, best known for his work as one third of the hip-hop trio De La Soul. Through his work with the group, Mercer is considered to be one of the most consistent and underrated MCs of all time. Beginning with the highly acclaimed 3 Feet High and Rising in 1989, Mercer has gone on to release nine albums with De La Soul.

== Early life ==
Mercer was born on August 17, 1969, in The Bronx, New York City, U.S.

== Cameos and album appearances ==
Year	Artist	Album	Track	With
2000	Rawkus Records	Hip Hop for Respect	One Four Love (Part 1)	Various Artists
2002	Mint Royale	Dancehall Places	Show Me	
2006	Oh No	Exodus into Unheard Rhythms	Smile a Lil Bit	
2007	LA Symphony	Unleashed	Universal	
2007	DJ Jazzy Jeff	The Return of the Magnificent	Let Me Hear U Clap	
2008	Jake One	White Van Music	Oh Really	Slug of Atmosphere
2008	J-Live	Then What Happened	The Upgrade	Oddisee
2009	Dan Le Sac Vs Scroobius Pip	(single)	Thou Shalt Always Kill	
2009	Master Ace and Edo G	Arts and Entertainment	Good Music	
2010	Slum Village	Villa Manifesto	Scheming	Phife Dawg, J Dilla and Vice Verse
2011	DJ Shadow	The Less You Know, the Better	Stay the Course	Talib Kweli
2011	Mac Miller	(remix)	Of the Soul	Raekwon
2013	Statik Selektah	Extended Play	Game Break	Lecrae and Termanology
2013	Marco Polo	PA2: The Director's Cut	Glory (Finish Hard)	A.G., Masta Ace and Dion Jenkins
2013	Wrekonize	The War Within	Church Road	
2013	Yancey Boys	Sunset Blvd.	Beautiful	Botni Applebum
2014	Statik Selektah	What Goes Around	God Knows	Bun B and Jared Evan
2015	Slum Village	Yes	Right Back	
2015	Hot Chip	Why Make Sense?	Love Is the Future	
2018	The Black Eyed Peas	Masters of the Sun Vol. 1	All Around the World	Phife Dawg and Ali Shaheed Muhammad
2019	Grand Analog	(single)	Mutations	
2020	Potatohead People	Mellow Fantasy	Baby Got Work	Kapok
2022	Robert Glasper	Black Radio III	Everybody Love	Musiq Soulchild
2022	Phife Dawg	Forever	2 Live Forever	Little Brother and Darien Brockington
2022	Diamond D	The Rear View	Flyin' High	
2022	Ibrahim Maalouf	Capacity to Love	Quiet Culture	
2022	Wildchild	Omowale	Father's Day	Big Daddy Kane
2023	Planet Hemp	JARDINEIROS: A COLHEITA	NUNCA TENHA MEDO	
2023	Statik Selektah	Round Trip	Round Trip (for Dave)	
2024	Ana Tijoux	Vida	Tu sae	Talib Kweli
2024	Common & Pete Rock	The Auditorium Vol. 1	When the Sun Shines Again	Bilal
2024	1999 Write the Future	hella (˃̣̣̥╭╮˂̣̣̥) ✧ ♡ ‧º·˚	LONG in the tOOth	The Budos Band
2025	Talib Kweli, J. Rawls & Javotti Media	N.A	Native Sons Part II	Maseo, Black Thought, Mike Gee, Afrika Baby Bam & Busta Rhymes
2025	Sean Kuti & Egypt 80	Heavier Yet Lays the Crownless Head	Stand Well Well (Grand Stand Version)	

== Aliases ==
All three members of De La Soul have used a number of aliases. The following are Mercer's most significant:

- Posdnuos/Pos – Pronounced "poss-duh-noose" (/pɒsdənus/). The name may be a combination of the reversed words sop, meaning "gift," and sound, a name Mercer went by while acting as a high school DJ. According to some sources, the fact that the words spelled backward are "sounds op [i.e., operative]" is intentional.
- Plug One – An early concept for 3 Feet High and Rising involved music being transmitted from Mars by three microphone plugs (each one representing a member of the group). Though this idea was abandoned, the titles "Plug One", "Plug Two" and "Plug Three" still became relevant on the album. Mercer's title of Plug One would eventually evolve into Plug Wonder Why, which would be shortened to a homophone of the original, Plug Won.
- Mercenary – Derived from the last name, "Mercer". This name was given to him by DCQ, brother of Mos Def.
- P-Pain – Caricature of the rapper T-Pain. He uses this alias in the song "Supervillainz" by DOOM.
