= The Fabulous Chi-Ali =

Studio album by Chi-Ali
- Released: March 24, 1992
- Recorded: 1990–1991
- Studio: Calliope, New York City
- Genre: Hip hop
- Length: 56:58
- Label: Relativity
- Producer: The Beatnuts; Mista Lawnge

Singles from The Fabulous Chi-Ali
- 1. "Age Ain't Nothin' but a #" Released: February 11, 1992; 2. "Roadrunner" Released: June 9, 1992; 3. "Let the Horns Blow/Funky Lemonade" Released: December 8, 1992

The Fabulous Chi-Ali is the only studio album by American rapper and the Native Tongues member Chi-Ali. It was released on March 24, 1992, via Relativity Records. The recording sessions took place at Calliope Studios, in New York City. The album was produced by the Beatnuts, except for one song produced by Black Sheep's Mista Lawnge. It features guest appearances from Trugoy the Dove of De La Soul, Dres of Black Sheep, Fashion of the Beatnuts, and Phife Dawg of A Tribe Called Quest.

The album peaked at No. 189 on the Billboard 200 and No. 8 on the Heatseekers Albums in the United States. It spawned three singles: "Age Ain't Nothin' but a #", "Roadrunner" and "Let the Horns Blow"/"Funky Lemonade", which made it to Nos. 6, 9 and 19 on the Hot Rap Singles chart.

== Critical reception ==
Professional ratings
Review scores
Source	Rating
AllMusic	2.5/5 stars
RapReviews	8/10

The Washington Post noted that "Chi-Ali wrote most of his own lyrics for The Fabulous Chi-Ali... But with all his outlandish and gratuitous talk of womanizing and gunslinging, you wonder if he took the words in all his old Big Daddy Kane and EPMD records a little too seriously."

== Track listing ==
All music is composed by The Beatnuts, except track 6 produced by Mista Lawnge.

No.	Title	Length
1.	"Intro"	0:24
2.	"Maniac Psycho"	3:15
3.	"Step Up"	3:06
4.	"Funky Lemonade"	3:38
5.	"In My Room"	3:14
6.	"Age Ain't Nothin' but a #"	4:27
7.	"Shorty Said Nah"	5:04
8.	"Let the Horns Blow" (featuring Dres, Trugoy the Dove, Fashion & Phife Dawg)	5:29
9.	"Roadrunner" (featuring Trugoy the Dove)	3:54
10.	"The Fabulous Chi"	2:43
11.	"Looped It"	3:29
12.	"Check My Record"	4:14
13.	"Murder Chi Wrote"	4:15
14.	"Chi-Ali vs. Vanilla Shake"	5:45
15.	"Jump to the Rhythm"	4:06
Total length:		56:58

== Chart history ==
Chart (1992)	Peak position
US Billboard 200	189
US Heatseekers Albums (Billboard)	8
