= B61 and B62 buses =

Bus routes in Brooklyn, New York

b61, b62
- Crosstown Line; Park Slope−Red Hook−Downtown Brooklyn−Long Island City−Astoria
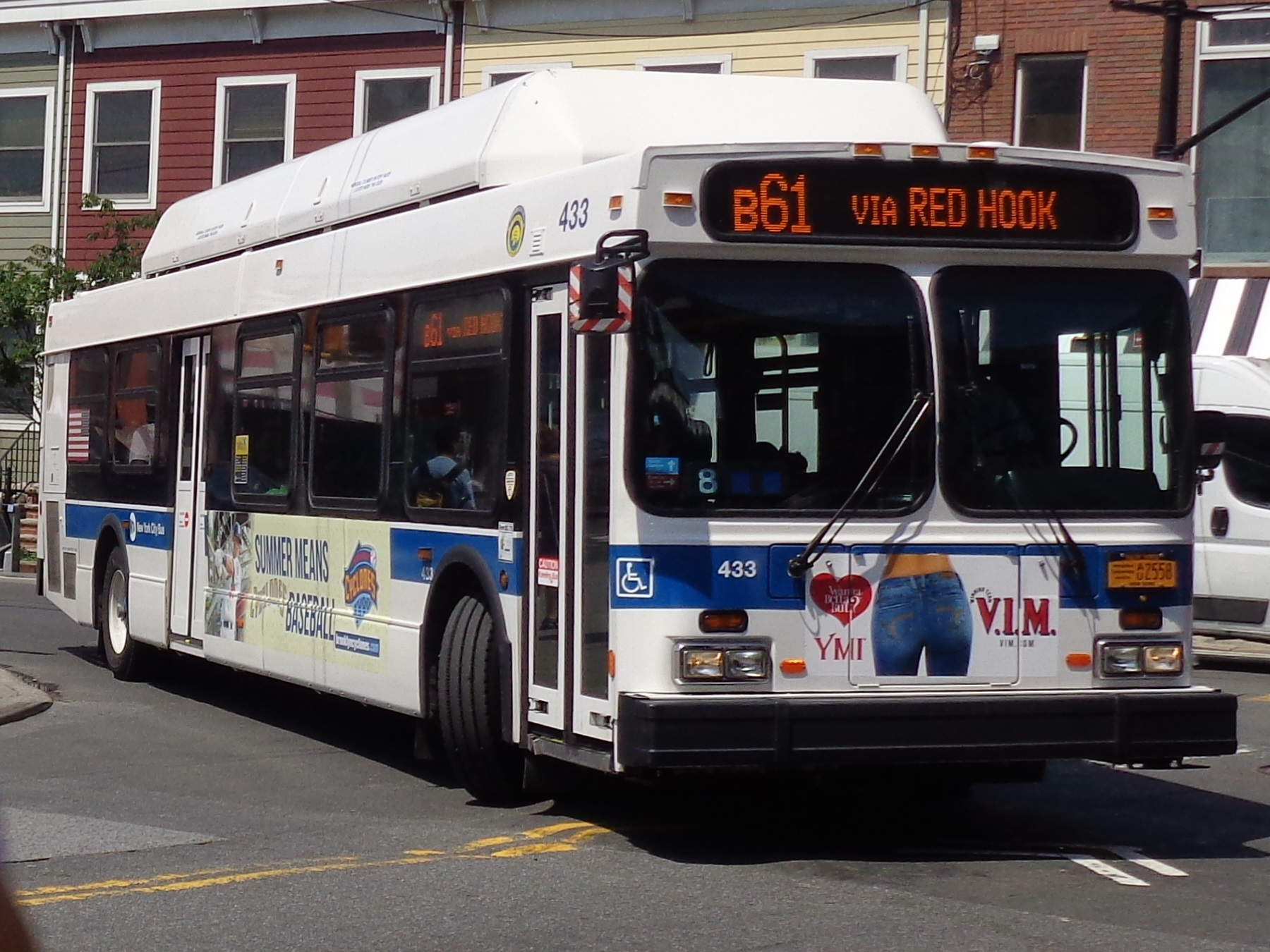
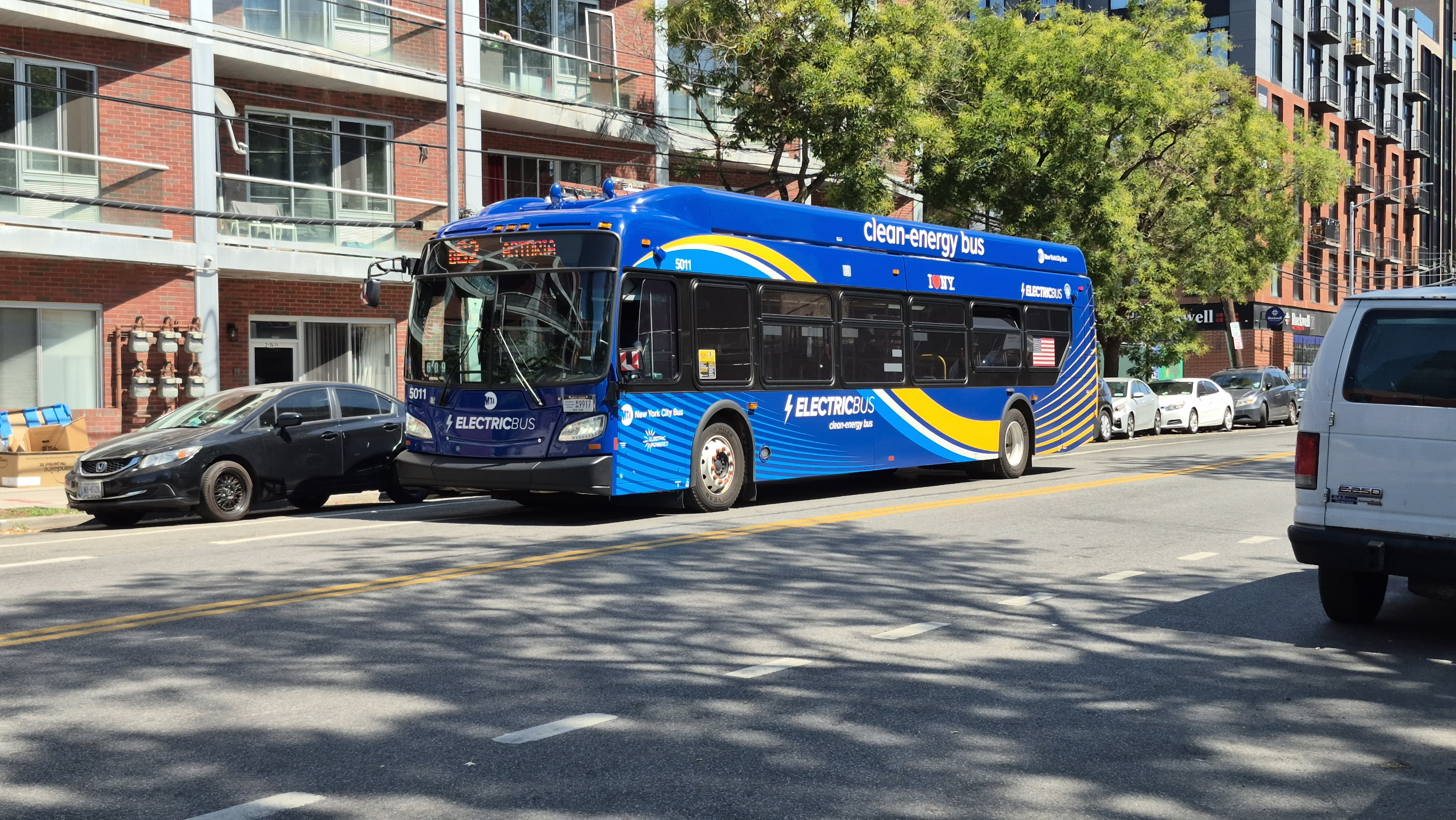
- A 2011 C40LF (433) on the B61 at Smith-9th Streets and a 2024 XE40 (5011) on the Astoria-bound B62 terminating at 2nd Street and 27th Avenue

Overview
- System: MTA Regional Bus Operations
- Operator: New York City Transit Authority
- Garage: Jackie Gleason Depot (B61); Grand Avenue Depot (B62)
- Vehicle: New Flyer C40LF CNG; New Flyer Xcelsior XN40 (B61 only) New Flyer Xcelsior XD40; New Flyer Xcelsior XDE40; New Flyer Xcelsior XE40 (B62 only)
- Began service: January 28, 1951 (B61 Red Hook−Greenpoint service); January 2010 (B62 Downtown Brooklyn−Long Island City service)
- Predecessors: B61 (Long Island City–Downtown Brooklyn), B75, B77

Route
- Locale: Brooklyn and Queens, New York, U.S.
- Communities served: Downtown Brooklyn, Boerum Hill, Cobble Hill, Red Hook, Gowanus, Park Slope, Windsor Terrace (B61); Astoria, Long Island City, Greenpoint, Williamsburg, Clinton Hill, Fort Greene, Brooklyn Navy Yard, Vinegar Hill, Downtown Brooklyn (B62)
- Start: Downtown Brooklyn – Fulton Mall/Jay Street–MetroTech station: B61: Fulton Street and Smith Street; B62: Boerum Place and Livingston Street
- End: B61: Park Slope/Windsor Terrace – 20th Street and Prospect Park West/Green-Wood Cemetery B62: Astoria, Queens – Astoria Houses
- Length: 5.6 miles (9.0 km) (B61); 9.7 miles (15.6 km) (B62)
- Other routes: Crosstown Line, Q69 and Q100 buses

Service
- Operates: 24 hours
- Annual patronage: 1,981,696 (B61, 2025); 1,712,167 (B62, 2025)
- Transfers: Yes
- Timetable: B61; B62

The Crosstown Line is a public transit line in Brooklyn, New York City, running along Van Brunt Street and Manhattan Avenue between Red Hook and Long Island City, Queens. Originally a streetcar line, it is now the B61 and the B62 bus routes. The northern section, the B62, is operated by MTA New York City Bus' Grand Avenue Depot in Maspeth, Queens, and the southern section is the B61, operated by MTA New York City Bus' Jackie Gleason Depot in Sunset Park. The entire route was a single line, the B61, until January 3, 2010; the B62 was previously a separate, parallel route between Downtown Brooklyn and Greenpoint, now part of the B43 route. The streetcar line, B61 and the original B62 previously operated from the now-closed Crosstown Depot in Greenpoint.

== Route description ==
=== Streetcar line ===
The original Crosstown Line began at the Richards Street at the foot of Erie Basin, the portion of the Upper New York Bay immediately south of Red Hook. It ran north on Richards Street to Woodhull Street (now the site of the Brooklyn–Battery Tunnel toll plaza), then north on Columbia Street to Atlantic Avenue at Brooklyn's South Ferry landing. The line then ran east along Atlantic Avenue into Downtown Brooklyn, turning north at Court Street and east at Joralemon Street, then east along Willoughby Street, then north on Raymond Street (now Ashland Place). It proceeded east along Park Avenue (occupied today by the Brooklyn–Queens Expressway at this location), then north along Washington Avenue through the Brooklyn Navy Yard and north on Kent Avenue to Broadway Ferry. The route ran east a short distance along Broadway, then ran north along Driggs Avenue (southbound trolleys used Bedford Avenue) through northern Williamsburg, and finally north on Manhattan Avenue to Box Street near the foot of Newtown Creek in Greenpoint. The streetcar line operated out of the Crosstown Depot at its northern terminus, which would later become a bus depot for the B61 and other routes.

=== B61 bus route ===
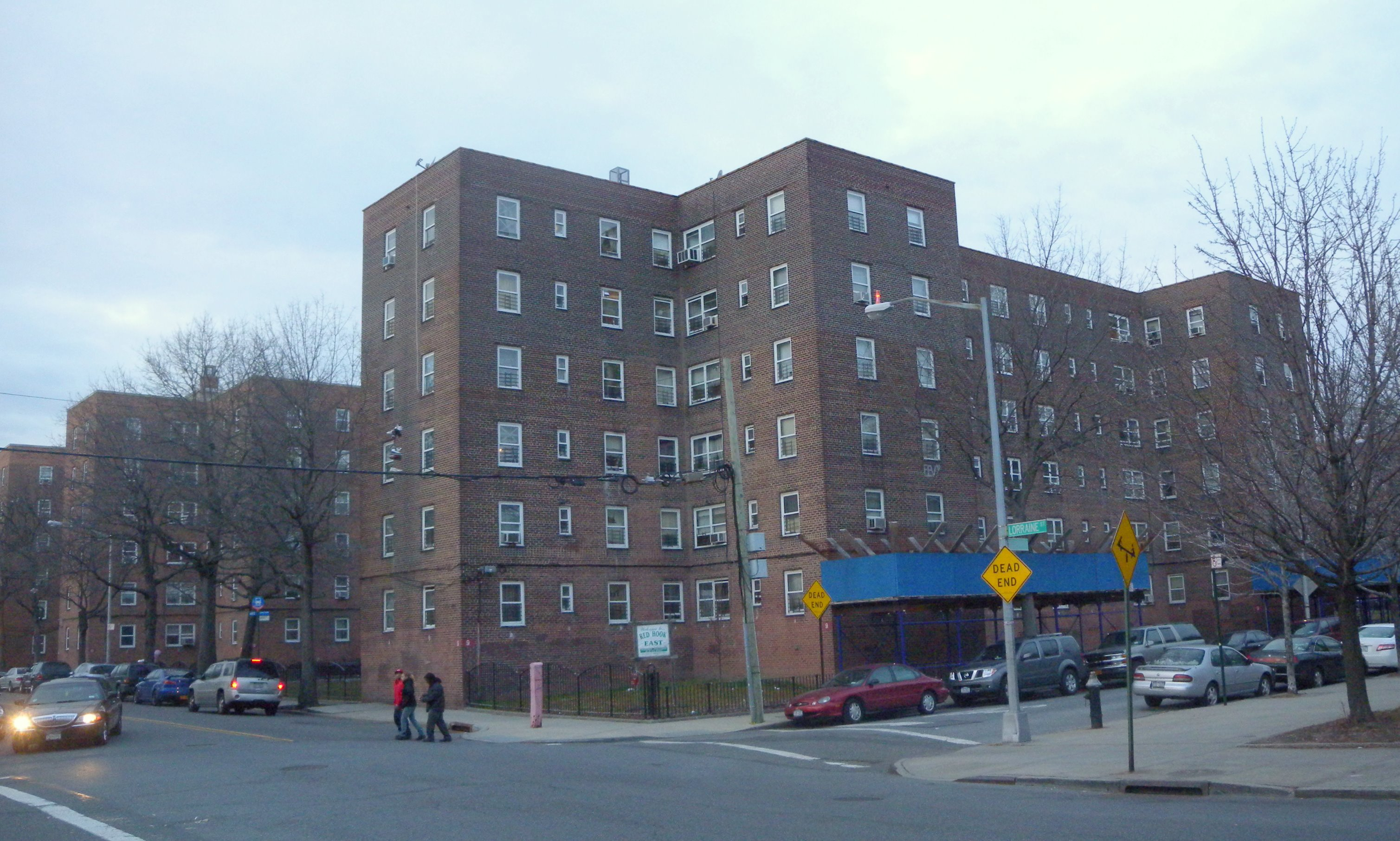
A B61 Downtown Brooklyn bus stop at the NYCHA Red Hook apartment complex at Lorraine/Henry Streets, before the B57 extension to Red Hook

The current B61 bus route begins at 20th Street and Prospect Park West at the north end of Green-Wood Cemetery and adjacent to the defunct Bishop Ford Central Catholic High School, straddling the Park Slope, South Slope, and Windsor Terrace neighborhoods. Northbound, the route turns west at 9th Street near New York Methodist Hospital, continuing west through Gowanus and Red Hook via 9th Street, Lorraine Street, and Beard Street (eastbound) or Van Dyke Street (westbound). Much of this routing in Gowanus and Red Hook between Smith Street and the Red Hook IKEA Terminal is shared with the B57, the only other bus line that travels to and from Red Hook. The B61 then parallels the Crosstown streetcar line, running north on Van Brunt Street (one block west of Richards Street) to Carroll Street near the Red Hook Container Terminal and the Brooklyn Battery Tunnel, then north along Columbia Street and east along Atlantic Avenue into Downtown Brooklyn. The route terminates just south of the Fulton Mall and the Jay Street–MetroTech subway station at Smith Street and Livingston Street, in front of the headquarters of the New York City Transit Authority. Southbound buses reenter service via Boerum Place one block west.

Prior to 2008, the B61 comprised the entire Crosstown surface route, running between Long Island City, Queens and the south end of Van Brunt Street in Red Hook. In 2008, the route's southern terminus was extended two blocks east to Otsego Street and Beard Street to serve the then-newly opened IKEA terminal in Red Hook. In January 2010 the route split into the current B61 and B62 routes to improve reliability. Six months later, the new B61 was extended to Prospect Park West to replace the B75’s Park Slope section and the whole B77 route.

Initially based out of the Crosstown Depot, then the Jackie Gleason Depot, the B61 was moved to the Grand Avenue Depot in Queens upon the depot's opening in January 2008. It was moved back to the Jackie Gleason Depot following the creation of the current B62.

=== B62 bus route ===
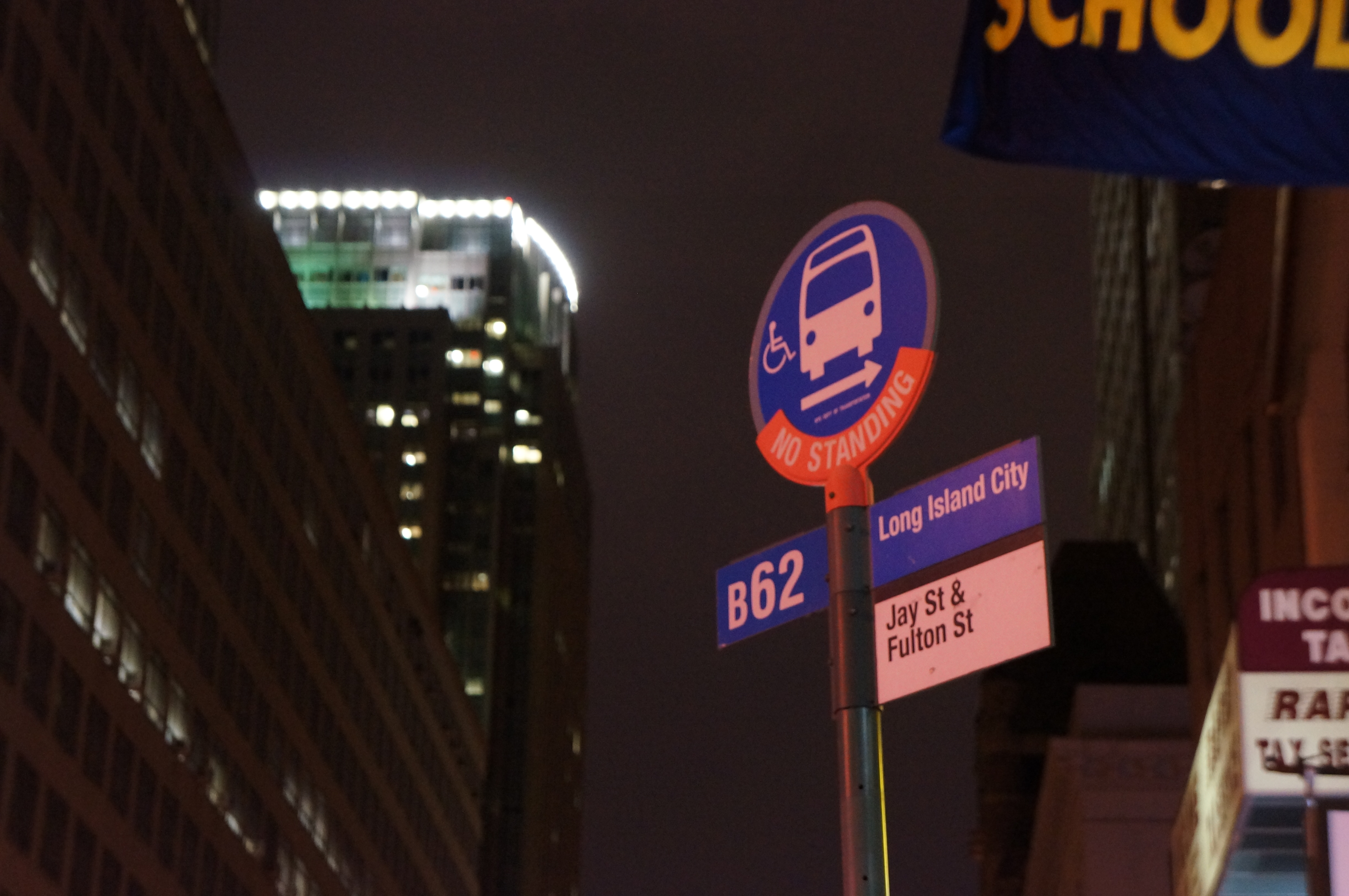
B62 Long Island City stop at Jay St-MetroTech, before the B62 was rerouted to serve Astoria instead

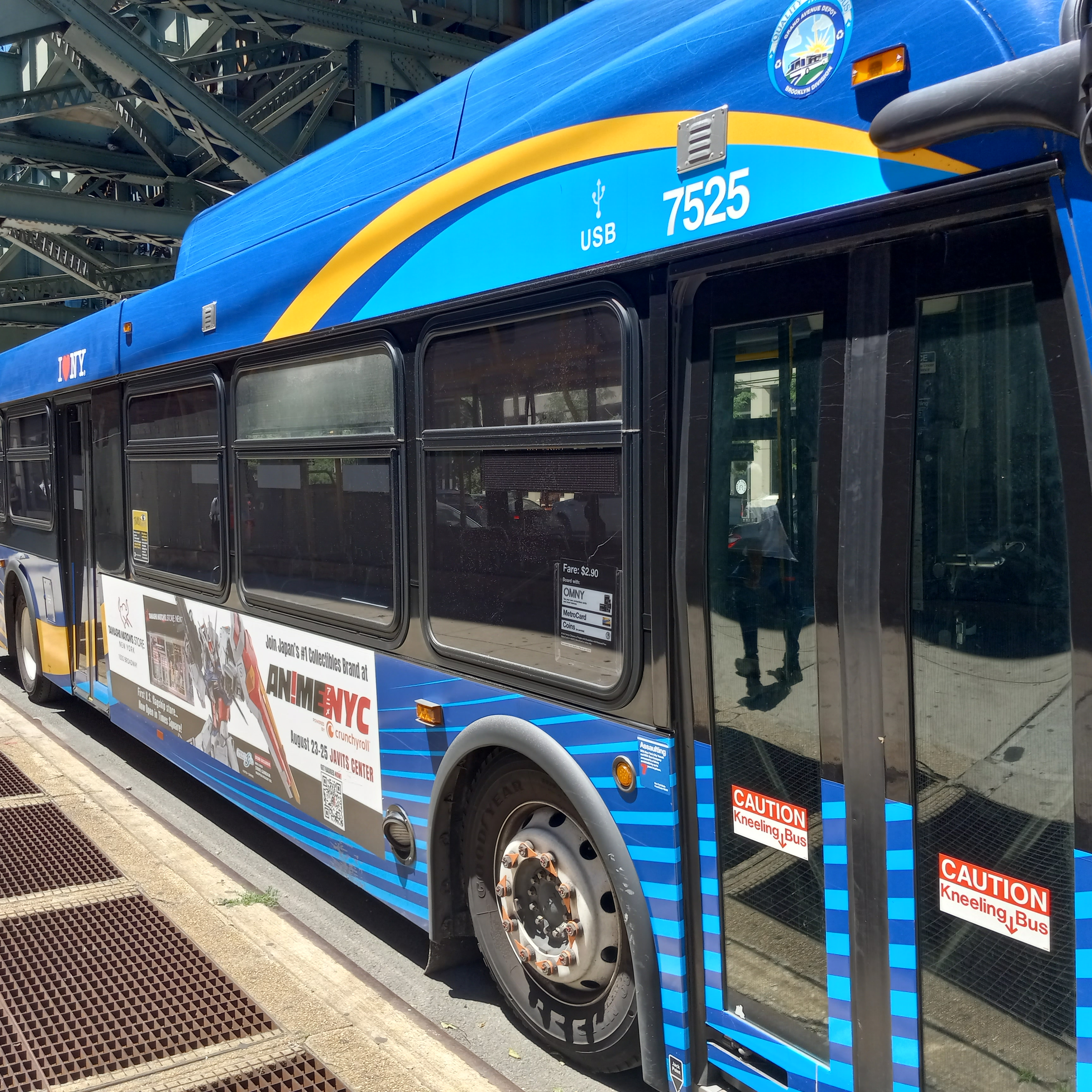
A 2018 XD40 (7525) on the B62 on layover in Long Island City

The B62 bus route operates between Schermerhorn Street and Boerum Place in front of the New York City Transit Headquarters (370 Jay Street) in Downtown Brooklyn, and Hallets Point in Astoria, Queens, at all times. It runs via Park Avenue and Manhattan Avenue in Brooklyn and via 21st Street in Queens, using the Pulaski Bridge to travel between the two boroughs. This bus replaced the northern leg of the B61 route on January 3, 2010. The B62 is currently based out of the Grand Avenue Depot in Maspeth, Queens.

== History ==
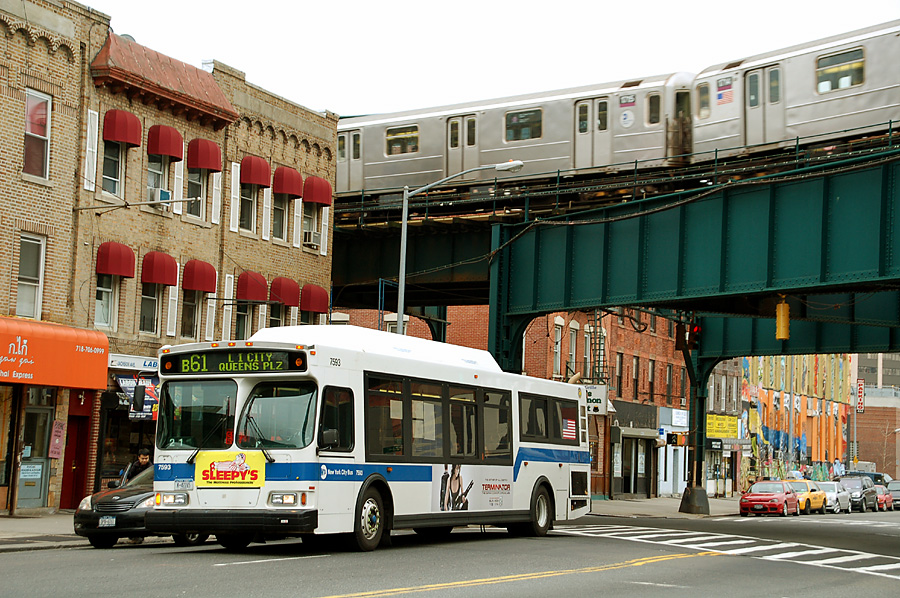
A 2003 Orion 07.501 (VII) OG CNG (7593) on the Queens Plaza-bound B61 in Long Island City in 2007, prior to the creation of the current service plan

=== Streetcar service ===
The Nassau Railroad was incorporated in 1865 with the power to build from the Hunters Point Ferry through Williamsburg to Flatbush, with a branch to the South Ferry. The Greenpoint and Williamsburgh Railroad and Nassau Railroad merged in 1868 to form the Brooklyn City, Hunter's Point and Prospect Park Railroad, with the right to build from the Hunters Point Ferry to the South Ferry with a branch to Prospect Park.

=== Bus service ===
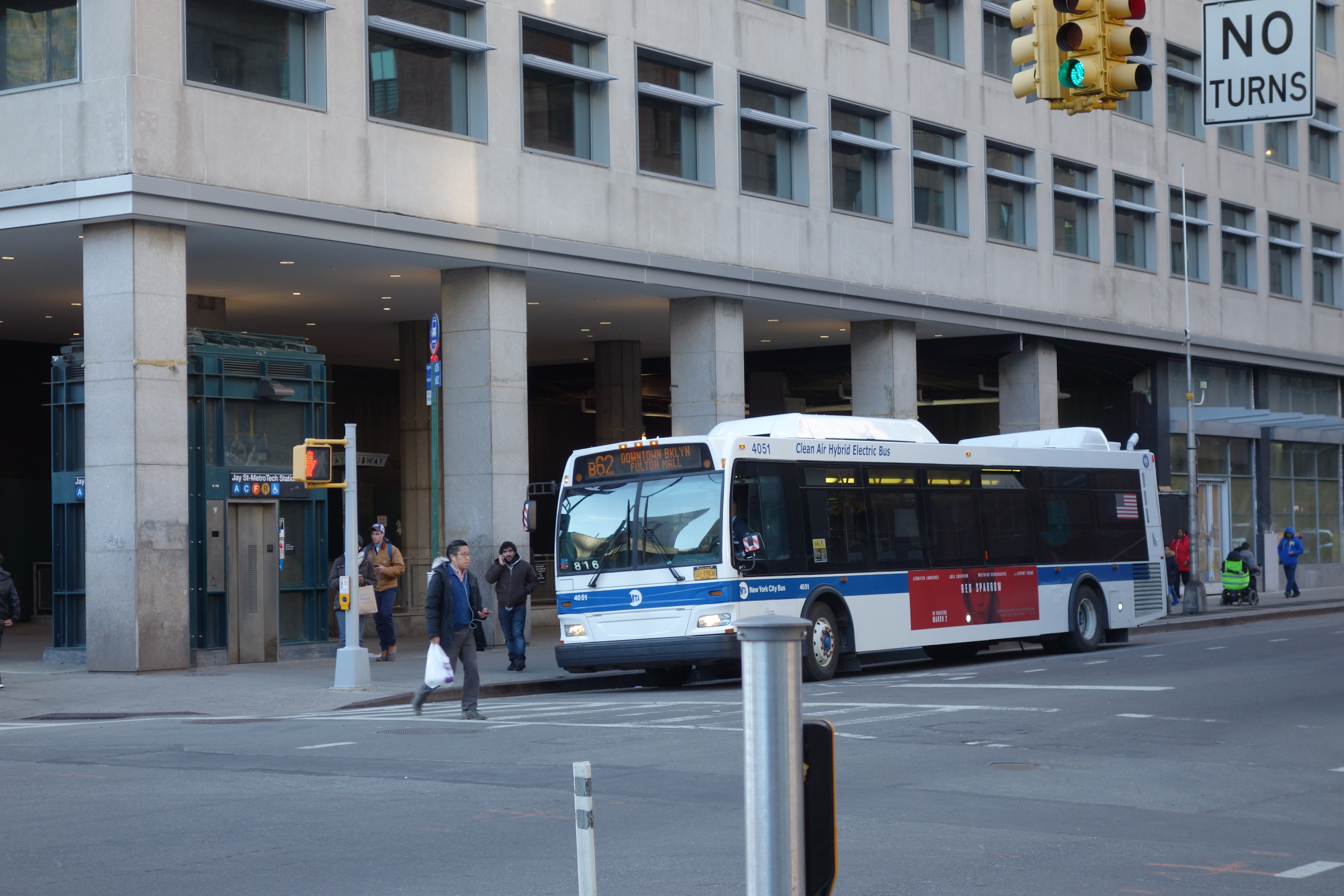
A 2009 Orion 07.501 (VII) NG HEV (4051) on the Downtown Brooklyn-Fulton Mall-bound B62 on Jay Street

On January 28, 1951, the line was replaced with bus service, designated "B-61", between Greenpoint and Red Hook (the later terminal labeled as "Erie Basin"). In February 1960, the Transit Authority rerouted the bus route between Clinton Hill and Downtown Brooklyn, from Myrtle Avenue onto Park Avenue, due to traffic congestion. The change was reversed on August 1 of that year after complaints from riders and local businesses. By 1963, the route had been extended across the Pulaski Bridge into Queens, terminating at Jackson Avenue and 49th Avenue in Hunters Point. On September 8, 1963, the line was split in northern Williamsburg, traveling on Bedford Avenue northbound and Driggs Avenue southbound, after the streets were turned into one-way avenues. In fall 1964, the northbound B61 was rerouted in Williamsburg from Kent Avenue to Bedford Avenue farther inland between the Brooklyn Navy Yard and Division Avenue, to improve passenger safety.

The route was extended to Queens Plaza in 1994 as part of the Metropolitan Transportation Authority's Fare Deal program. In January 2008, the B61 was moved to the newly opened Grand Avenue Depot, with 22 buses allotted to route. Also that month, the B61 and B77 were rerouted to serve the IKEA Red Hook terminal, which opened on June 18, 2008.

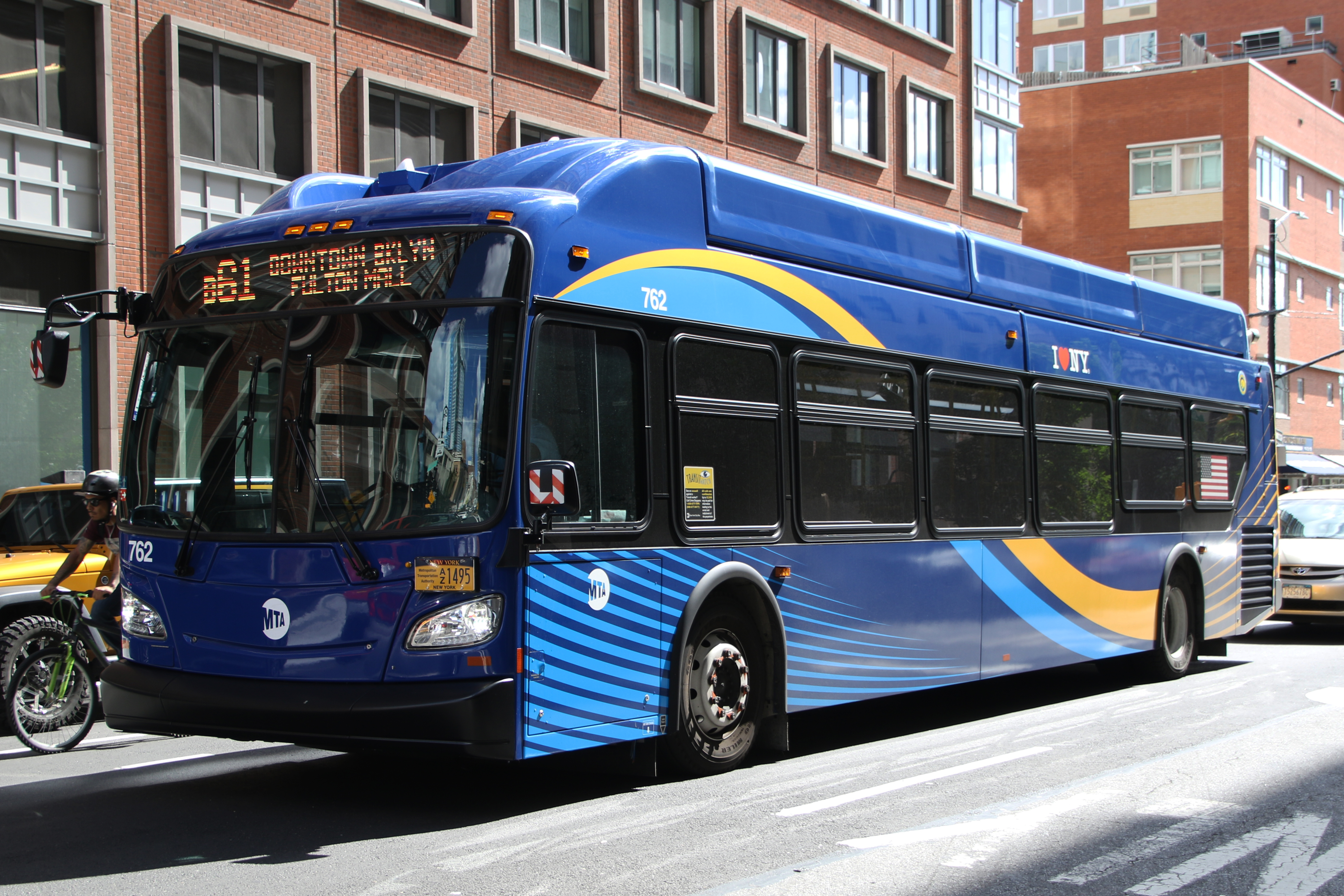
A newly delivered 2017 XN40 (762) on the Downtown Brooklyn-bound B61 on Jay Street in 2017

For many years through the 2000s, the B61 had been considered an unreliable route, due to the route's length, infrequent and off-schedule service, and traffic congestion in Downtown Brooklyn. To remedy the situation, on January 3, 2010, the B61 was split into the B61 (Red Hook−Downtown Brooklyn) and a new B62 (Downtown Brooklyn−Long Island City). In addition, the B62 was rerouted to serve the Williamsburg Bridge Plaza Bus Terminal to provide convenient connections to bus and subway routes there. The change had been discussed by the MTA and local politicians since 2007. On June 27, 2010, the new B61 was merged with the discontinued B75 and B77 routes during the 2010 MTA budget crisis. The B61 was extended east of Red Hook into Park Slope, replacing the entire B77 route and the eastern/southern leg of the B75. In November 2011, a report on B61 service was released by New York City Council member Brad Lander. In April 2012, additional buses were added to the B61 route. Later that year, MTA Bus Time was installed on B61 buses.

==== Bus redesigns ====
In December 2019, the MTA released a draft redesign of the Queens bus network. The redesign included a "high density" route called the QT1, which would have run from Astoria, Queens, to Downtown Brooklyn. The redesign was delayed due to the COVID-19 pandemic in New York City in 2020, and the original draft plan was dropped due to negative feedback. A revised plan was released in March 2022. As part of the new plan, the B62 bus would be extended northward in Queens along 21st Street, terminating at 27th Avenue/2nd Street in Astoria, and would no longer serve Queensboro or Queens Plazas.

On December 1, 2022, the MTA released a draft redesign of the Brooklyn bus network. As part of the plan, the B61 would be truncated to 15th Street and Prospect Park West at its southern end, and service south of 15th Street would be provided by a new bus route, the B81. In addition, the northbound B61 would no longer directly serve the IKEA store in Red Hook; the southbound B61, as well as the new B27 and B81 routes, would continue to stop in front of the IKEA store. The B62 was already planned to be extended to Astoria and converted into a limited-stop route as part of the Queens redesign. Under the Brooklyn redesign, the B62 would use Flushing Avenue in the vicinity of the Brooklyn Navy Yard. Within Williamsburg, northbound buses would use Bedford Avenue, while southbound buses would use Driggs and Lee Avenues; the route would no longer use Broadway or Division, Kent, or Wythe Avenues. North of Nassau and Driggs Avenues, the B62 would use McGuinness Boulevard instead of Manhattan Avenue. Late-night service would still run on York Street. On both routes, closely-spaced stops would be removed.

No changes to the B62's Queens segment were made in the Proposed Final Plan for Queens in December 2023. On December 17, 2024, addendums to the final plan were released, including a few stop adjustments for the B62 and reverting it back to a "Local" route. On January 29, 2025, the current plan was approved by the MTA Board, and the Queens Bus Redesign went into effect in two different phases during Summer 2025. The B62 is part of Phase II, which began on August 31, 2025.

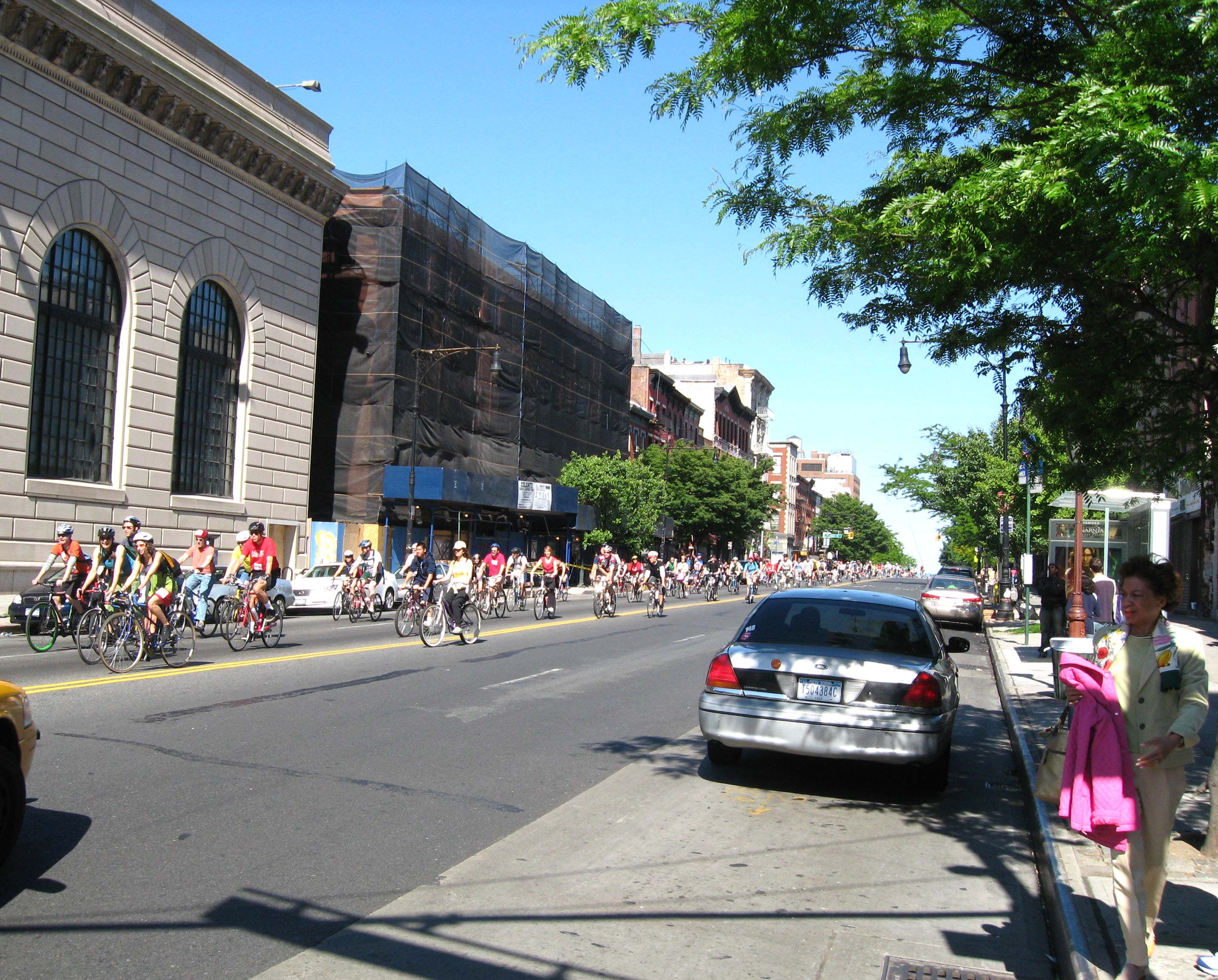
Across from the bicyclists is a B61 Park Slope/B63 Cobble Hill bus stop at Atlantic Avenue/Court Street, hidden in this photo

== See also ==
- Greenpoint and Williamsburgh Railroad
- Graham Avenue Line and Tompkins Avenue Line
- Brooklyn–Queens Connector
