= Elise Neal =

American actress

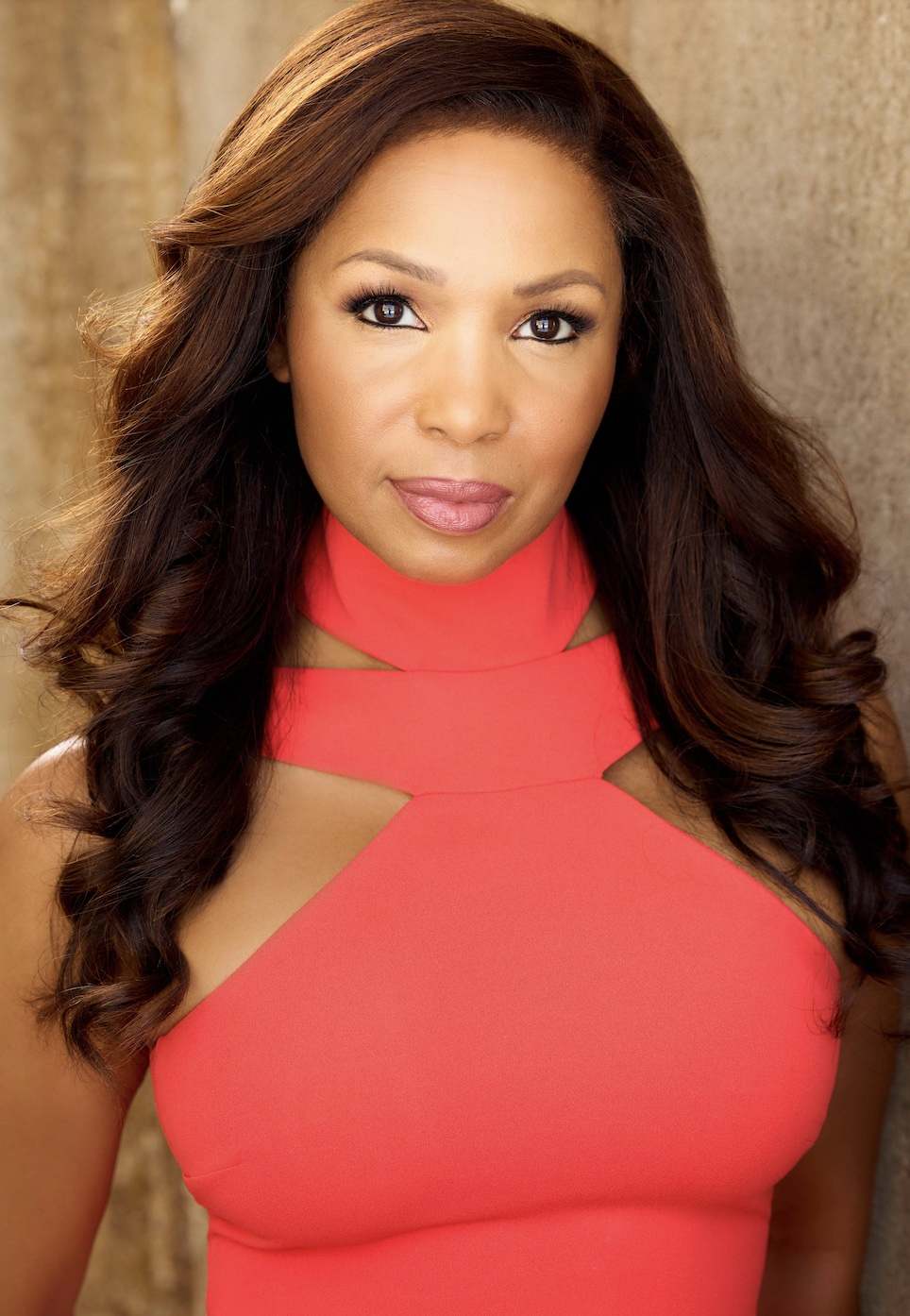
- Born: Elise Demetria Neal; March 14, 1966 (age 60); Memphis, Tennessee, U.S.
- Education: University of the Arts
- Occupation: Actress
- Years active: 1991–present

Elise Demetria Neal (born March 14, 1966) is an American actress known for her work in television and film. She rose to prominence in 1997 with roles in Rosewood, Money Talks, and Scream 2. She later starred as Yvonne Hughley in the ABC/UPN sitcom The Hughleys (1998–2002), earning two NAACP Image Award nominations for Outstanding Actress in a Comedy Series. Her notable film credits include Restaurant (1998), Mission to Mars (2000), and Logan (2017). For her performance in Hustle & Flow (2005), she received a Screen Actors Guild Award nomination for Outstanding Performance by a Cast in a Motion Picture.

== Early life ==
Neal was born on March 14, 1966, in Memphis, Tennessee, the daughter of a nurse and a construction worker. She was a ballet dancer and a cheerleader. She graduated from Overton High School for the Creative and Performing Arts.

Elise attended the University of the Arts in Philadelphia on a full-ride scholarship. After two years, Elise moved to New York City where she landed role in her dream job in musical theater and found herself traveling the world with various touring companies. Her experience in musical theater allowed her to easily transition into commercials, eventually bringing her to Los Angeles. Neal was a member of the Tennessee Ballet Company.

== Career ==
Neal was an accomplished dancer and appeared in several hip hop and R&B music videos in the early 1990s. One of her earliest jobs was as a background dancer in Chubb Rock's music video for "Just the Two of Us." Other music videos Neal has appeared in include Black Sheep's 1992 video for Strobelite Honey, Father MC's 1991 video for "Lisa Baby", Aretha Franklin's 1998 video for "A Rose Is Still a Rose", Trick Daddy's 2001 video "I'm a Thug", and Vanessa Williams' video "Work to Do". Neal was featured in the November 2007 edition of King Magazine. Neal also appeared as a backing dancer in the music video for Dannii Minogue's 1993 single "This Is It".

Neal made her film debut in Spike Lee's Malcolm X (1992). She landed the role of Janice Sinclair on the soap opera Loving. She then played fighter pilot J.J. Fredericks on the series seaQuest 2032. Neal was cast in the high-profile role of Hallie in Scream 2. Her character was originally written to be one of the killers of the movie, but due to a script leak her role was changed. She portrayed school teacher Scrappie in Rosewood.

Her breakout role was being cast as Yvonne Hughley, the wife of D.L. Hughley in the television sitcom The Hughleys (1998−2002). She received two NAACP Image Award nominations for Outstanding Actress in a Comedy Series for her role in the series. Following The Hughleys, Neal portrayed kindergarten teacher Tia Jewel in All of Us. She left the series in 2005.

She has made guest appearances on Law & Order, Hangin' with Mr. Cooper, and Method & Red. Other film credits include: Paid in Full, Money Talks, and Mission to Mars. In Restaurant, she played Jeanine, a waitress who aspires to be a singer. Neal acted in a 2001 remake of Brian's Song as the wife of Gale Sayers.

Neal received her third NAACP Image Award nomination in 2006, in the category of Outstanding Supporting Actress in a Motion Picture for the film Hustle & Flow as Yevette, the wife of Anthony Anderson's character. Her role in the 2007 film 4 Life also marked her first soundtrack single, "I'm Down Baby". She also appeared in the series K-Ville as Ayana Boulet.

Expanding her role as producer, Neal is creating and developing several multimedia projects: a reality show based on her R&B group, "Assorted Flavors", a fitness and lifestyle brand, and several feature projects through her development deal with Mandalay Bay Entertainment. She appeared on reality show Hollywood Divas.

She played Alana in Love Ranch (2010). Neal guest starred on an episode of The Soul Man. She portrayed singer Gladys Knight in biopic Aaliyah: The Princess of R&B (2014). In a negative review of the film, Jon Caramanica opined Neal was the best actor in the production. Neal played Kathryn Munson in the 2017 superhero film Logan and appeared on television series Into the Dark.

== Filmography ==
=== Film ===
Year	Title	Role	Notes
1992	Malcolm X	Hooker	
1993	Tales of the City	Young Woman	TV movie
1995	Let It Be Me	Carlita	
1997	Rosewood	Beulah (Scrappie)	
1997	Def Jam's How to Be a Player	Nadine	
1997	Money Talks	Paula	
1997	Scream 2	Hallie	
1998	Chance of a Lifetime	Amy	TV movie
1998	Restaurant	Jeanine	
2000	Mission to Mars	Debra Graham	
2001	The Rising Place	Wilma Watson	
2001	Sacred Is the Flesh	Gabi Paige	
2001	Brian's Song	Linda Sayers	TV movie
2002	Paid in Full	Aunt June	
2003	Playas Ball	Summer Twitty	
2005	Hustle & Flow	Yevette	
2007	4 Life	Jare	Video
2008	Who's Deal?	Passion	
2009	Preaching to the Pastor	Monica	
2010	Let God Be the Judge	Rachel	
2010	Love Ranch	Alana	
2010	Love Chronicles: Secrets Revealed	Monique	Video
2010	Gun	Rich's Mom	
2010	N-Secure	Leslie	
2010	Love Me or Leave Me	Josephine Wyatt	TV movie
2011	The Slap	Gloria	Short
2011	Lord, All Men Can't Be Dogs	Diane	
2011	The Perfect Man	Trisha	
2011	Poolboy: Drowning Out the Fury	Florence	
2011	Breathe	Kristy Burgin	
2012	The Undershepherd	Sister Roberts	
2012	Who's Watching the Kids	Delia	
2013	School of Hard Knocks	Kim	Video
2013	1982	Stacy	
2014	The Fright Night Files	Coffee Black	TV movie
2014	Aaliyah: The Princess of R&B	Gladys Knight	TV movie
2016	Ladies Book Club	Rona	TV movie
2016	36 Hour Layover	Rebecca	
2016	What Are the Chances?	Gina	
2016	ANYWHERE, U.S.A.	Kim	Short
2017	Logan	Kathryn Munson	
2017	Tragedy Girls	Mrs. Hooper	
2017	The White Sistas	Erin White	
2017	Our Dream Christmas	Cookie	
2018	Don't Get Caught	Gina	Video
2018	We Belong Together	Megan	
2018	Her Only Choice	Sherry	
2018	First Impression	Kym Pine	TV movie
2019	All In	Gina	
2019	Nineteen Summers	Porsha	
2019	I Left My Girlfriend for Regina Jones	Regina Jones	
2020	The Grudge	TV Contestant	
2020	The Sin Choice	Angela Smith	
2020	The App That Stole Christmas	Carly	
2021	Ransum Games	Denise	
2021	A State of Mind	Keisha Thomas	
2022	Breaking	Juanita	
2022	Lola 2	Sasha	
2023	Survival	Tally Fruge	
2023	Phels High	Tina Lloyd	
2023	Christmas Angel	Natalie	
2025	Cockroach	Mom	Short

=== Television ===
Year	Title	Role	Notes
1991	Another World	Dancer	Episode: "Episode #1.6923"
1992	Law & Order	Charlayne Ward	Episode: "Cradle to Grave"
1993	Getting By	Debbie	Episode: "Back to Nature"
1993	Tales of the City	Spa Instructor	Episode: "Episode #1.3"
1993	California Dreams	Miss Jackie	Episode: "High Plains Dreamer"
1993	Family Matters	Heather	Episode: "Car Wars"
1993–95	Hangin' with Mr. Cooper	Lisa	Guest Cast: Season 1 & 3
1994	The Fresh Prince of Bel-Air	Wendy Robertson	Episode: "M Is for the Many Things She Gave Me"
1994	Loving	Janey Sinclair	Regular Cast
1994	Red Shoe Diaries	Dancer	Episode: "Emily's Dance"
1995	Chicago Hope	Tamara Parnett	Episode: "Cutting Edges"
1995	Pointman	Millie	Episode: "Take the Points"
1995-96	seaQuest DSV	Lieutenant J.J. Fredericks	Main Cast: Season 3
1996	ABC Afterschool Special	Alicia	Episode: "Daddy's Girl"
1996	Living Single	Sharon	Episode: "School's Out Forever"
1996	High Incident	Arial	Episode: "Bullet the Blue Sky"
1996	The Steve Harvey Show	Juanita Du'Shea	Episode: "Pool Sharks Git Bit"
1998	The Wayans Bros	Tanya Cooper	Episode: "The Rich Girl"
1998	Fantasy Island	Catherine	Episode: "Wishboned"
1998–02	The Hughleys	Yvonne Williams-Hughley	Main Cast
2001	E! True Hollywood Story	Herself	Episode: "Scream"
2002	Hollywood Squares	Herself/Panelist	Recurring Guest
2002	Pyramid	Herself/Celebrity Contestant	Episode: "Nov 8, 2002"
2003	A.U.S.A.	Jill Davis	Episode: "Pilot"
2004	The 100 Scariest Movie Moments	Herself	Episode: "Part I: 100-81"
2004	Method & Red	Brenda	Episode: "Something About Brenda"
2003–05	All of Us	Tia Jewel	Main Cast: Season 1–2
2005	Black in the 80s	Herself	Episode: "Def Jams" & "Color TV"
2005	Weekends at the D.L.	Herself	Episode: "Episode #1.13"
2005	CSI: Crime Scene Investigation	Giselle	Episode: "Bodies in Motion"
2007	K-Ville	Ayana Boulet	Recurring Cast
2009	My Manny	Jennifer	Main Cast
2009	Private Practice	Janine	Episode: "What You Do for Love"
2010	Life After	Herself	Episode: "Elise Neal"
2011	Funny or Die Presents	Peaches	Episode: "The Burn Unit"
2011	The Cape	Susan Voyt	Recurring Cast
2011–12	A.N.T. Farm	Roxanne Parks	Recurring Cast: Season 1
2012	Scandal	Anna Gordon	Episode: "The Other Woman"
2013	Real Husbands of Hollywood	Herself	Episode: "Karma's a Mitch" & "Hart vs. Mosley"
2013	Basketball Wives	Herself	Episode: "Episode #5.8"
2013	Belle's	Jill Cooper	Main Cast
2013	The Soul Man	Jessica	Episode: "Revelations"
2014	According to Him + Her	Herself	Episode: "Episode #1.3"
2014-15	Hollywood Divas	Herself	Main Cast: Season 1–2
2017	Tales	Beatriz	Episode: "A Story to Tell"
2019–20	25 Words or Less	Herself/Contestant	Recurring Guest
2020	Into the Dark	Dr. Linda Johnson	Episode: "Good Boy"
2021	A Black Lady Sketch Show	Gigi	Episode: "If I'm Paying These Chili's Prices, You Cannot Taste My Steak!"
2022-24	The Black Hamptons	Sydney Britton	Main Cast
2023	See It Loud: The History of Black Television	Herself	Episode: "Laughing Out Loud"
2023	Angel	Teresa	Main Cast
2025	G.R.I.T.S. (Girls Raised in the South)	Pam	Recurring Cast

=== Music Videos ===
Year	Artist	Song
1990	Kwamé	"Ownleeeue"
1991	Father MC	"Lisa Baby"
1991	Chubb Rock	"Just the Two of Us"
1991	Black Sheep	"Strobelite Honey"
1992	Vanessa Williams featuring Dres	"Work to Do"
1993	Dannii Minogue	"This Is It"
1998	Aretha Franklin	"A Rose Is Still a Rose"
2001	Trick Daddy	"I'm a Thug"
2002	Aaliyah	"Miss You"
2011	Rick Ross	"Ashes to Ashes"

=== Documentary ===
Year	Title	Role	Notes
2008	My Nappy Roots: A Journey Through Black Hair-itage	Herself	
2011	Still Screaming: The Ultimate Scary Movie Retrospective	Herself	

== Awards and nominations ==
Year	Award	Category	Nominated work	Result
2000	NAACP Image Awards	Outstanding Actress in a Comedy Series	The Hughleys	Nominated
2001	NAACP Image Awards	Outstanding Actress in a Comedy Series	The Hughleys	Nominated
2006	NAACP Image Awards	Outstanding Supporting Actress in a Motion Picture	Hustle & Flow	Nominated
2006	Screen Actors Guild	Outstanding Performance by a Cast in a Motion Picture	Hustle & Flow	Nominated
2006	Black Reel Awards	Outstanding Ensemble	Hustle & Flow	Nominated
