= Age Ain't Nothin' but a Number (Chi-Ali song) =

Song by Chi-Ali

"Age Ain't Nothin' But a #"

Single by Chi-Ali

from the album The Fabulous Chi-Ali
- Released: February 11, 1992
- Studio: Calliope Studios (New York, NY)
- Genre: Hip hop
- Label: Relativity
- Lyricist(s): Chi-Ali Griffith; Darrel Steven Lighty
- Producer(s): Baby Chris (exec.); Mista Lawnge

Chi-Ali singles chronology
"Age Ain't Nothin' But a #" (1992)	"Roadrunner" (1992)

Music video
- "Age Ain't Nothin' But a #" on YouTube

"Age Ain't Nothin' But a #" is a song by American rapper Chi-Ali. It was released on February 11, 1992 as a lead single from the rapper's only studio album The Fabulous Chi-Ali through Relativity Records. The song was written by Chi-Ali & Baby Chris and produced by Mista Lawnge. The single reached number 6 on the Billboard Hot Rap Singles chart.

== Track listing ==
No.	Title	Producer(s)	Length
1.	"Age Ain't Nothin' But a #"	Mista Lawnge
2.	"Maniac Psycho"	The Beatnuts
3.	"Age Ain't Nothin' But a #" (Instrumental)	Mista Lawnge

== Personnel ==
- Chi-Ali Griffith – lyrics, vocals
- Andrew "Dr. Butcher" Venable – scratches
- William "Mista Lawnge" McLean – producer
- The Beatnuts – producers
- Darrel Steven Lighty – lyrics, executive producer
- "Lightning" Lisle Leete – engineering

== Charts ==
Chart (1992)	Peak position
US Hot Rap Songs (Billboard)	6
