= Stay Tuned (film) =

1992 American fantasy comedy film

- Theatrical release poster by Drew Struzan
- Directed by: Peter Hyams
- Screenplay by: Jim Jennewein; Tom S. Parker
- Story by: Jim Jennewein; Tom S. Parker; Richard Siegel
- Produced by: James G. Robinson
- Starring: John Ritter; Pam Dawber; Jeffrey Jones; Eugene Levy
- Cinematography: Peter Hyams
- Edited by: Peter E. Berger
- Music by: Bruce Broughton
- Production company: Morgan Creek Productions
- Distributed by: Warner Bros.
- Release date: August 14, 1992
- Running time: 88 minutes
- Country: United States
- Language: English
- Budget: $15-20 million
- Box office: $12 million

Stay Tuned is a 1992 American fantasy comedy film shot and directed by Peter Hyams from a screenplay by Jim Jennewein and Tom S. Parker, with an animated sequence supervised by Chuck Jones. The film stars John Ritter, Pam Dawber, Jeffrey Jones and Eugene Levy.

Its plot follows television fanatic Roy Knable who gets a deal from a salesman, who is really an emissary from Hell, for a new high-tech satellite dish to gain as many exclusive channels as he wants. The dish then sucks Roy and his wife Helen into a hellish television world, where they must survive for twenty-four hours in order to be released from it. These experiences teach Roy a lesson about the dangers of too much TV.

Stay Tuned was released in the United States on August 14, 1992, by Warner Bros. The film received mixed reviews from critics and was a commercial failure, grossing $12 million against a $15–20 million budget. A television series based on the film is in development for Hulu.

== Plot ==
Struggling Seattle plumbing salesman, former fencing athlete and couch potato Roy Knable lives with his neglected wife Helen. After a fight which involves Helen smashing the family's television with one of Roy's fencing trophies as a wake-up call to reality, salesman Johnny Spike appears at the couple's door, offering them a high-tech satellite dish system filled with six hundred sixty-six channels of programs one cannot view on regular television. (Note: With titles including "Three Men and Rosemary's Baby" and "Sadistic Hidden Videos".) After discovering the television set, Helen starts planning to divorce. Unbeknownst to Roy, Spike is an emissary from Hell who wants to boost the influx of souls by arranging for television junkies to be assassinated in gruesome and ironic situations. The 'candidates' are sucked into Hellvision, a hellish world where they must survive demonically satirical versions of different programs. If they can survive for twenty-four hours, they are free to go, but if they die, then their souls will become the property of Satan.

Roy and Helen are sucked into Hellvision and are put through a hellish game show, wrestling match and the comedy-drama "Northern Overexposure", (Note: A parody of Northern Exposure.) in which they meet Crowley, an exiled former co-worker of Spike's. Through tenacity, improvisation and luck, the Knables stay alive and escape into different channels through portals hidden within the programs. While watching, their young son Darryl recognizes his parents fighting for their lives as animated mice in a cartoon in which a robotic cat pursues them, (Note: A parody of Looney Tunes and Tom and Jerry.) after which they become separated. Roy appears in the "Saturday Night Dead" segment "Duane's Underworld", (Note: A parody of Saturday Night Live and Wayne's World.) featuring the titular characters as zombies, in which he is nearly burned to death with hot pokers. Roy eventually finds Helen in a black-and-white gangster film and the Knables escape into "Off With His Head", a miniseries about the French Revolution in which Roy is captured and nearly beheaded. Darryl, a tech geek, uses radio equipment to patch into the miniseries and convince the characters he is God, demanding they let his parents go, which infuriates Spike.

Roy's twenty-four hours are up at this point, but since he was the only one who signed the contract, this activates a loophole wherein Spike can make Helen remain in Hellvision. Spike enters Hellvision and kidnaps Helen, changing channels again. She finds herself tied to a cart stacked with dynamite sitting across a railway track in a Western film, with Spike announcing that the 3:10 to Yuma is due soon. Spike informs Roy and his kids - watching from their home - that Helen is being held captive on Channel One, in an attempt to lure Roy.

Roy goes back in and has a gunfight with Spike, wherein he is shot, but the bullet is stopped by Roy's remote control. He and Spike then fight over the latter's remote and this causes the duo to be trapped in more demonic and twisted parodies, (Note: Including parodies of Star Trek: The Next Generation and Driving Miss Daisy (titled "Driving Over Miss Daisy").) a violent ice hockey game, a crash test dummy demonstration and an episode of Three's Company. Roy eventually confronts Spike in a medieval swashbuckling film and they have a fencing match. They then get transported into a music video, (Note: Featuring Salt-N-Pepa.) where Roy gets hold of Spike's remote and sends him back to the film. Returning to Channel One, Roy tries to save Helen by changing channels, only to find that the demonic production team at Hellvision have locked out all inter-channel escape options. The Knables eventually realize they can still escape by turning the remote off.

They arrive back in their garden. Their neighbor's Rottweiler appears about to attack, but ends up getting sucked into the dish just before it destroys itself. Spike gets eliminated by the Rottweiler on the command of Crowley and is then succeeded in his executive position by Pierce, a younger upstart intern. Roy cuts back on his television viewing, quits his job as a plumbing salesman and opens his own fencing school, in which he advises a student that watching too much television can get you into trouble.

== Cast ==
- John Ritter as Roy Knable
- Pam Dawber as Helen Knable, Roy's wife
- Jeffrey Jones as Johnny Spike
- Bob Dishy as Murray Seidenbaum
- Don Calfa as Wetzel
- Eugene Levy as Crowley
- David Tom as Darryl Knable, Roy & Helen's son
- Heather McComb as Diane Knable, Roy & Helen's daughter
- Erik King as Pierce
- Susan Blommaert as Ducker
- George Gray as Mr. Gorgon
- Faith Minton as Mrs. Gorgon
- Don Pardo as the game show's announcer
- Lou Albano as the wrestling match's announcer
- Salt-N-Pepa as themselves

The group's manager and primary producer Hurby "Luv Bug" Azor (credited under his birth name "Herby Azor") and his brother Steve Azor appear as dancers during the "Start Me Up" segment. In the same segment, Fatima Robinson is additionally one of the dancers.

Future National Hockey League referee Mike Hasenfratz appeared as an extra in a hockey fight scene.

== Production ==
Jim Jennewein and Tom S. Parker were both working in advertising, with Parker working as a copywriter for Saatchi & Saatchi and Jennewein as an associate creative director at Speer, Young & Hollander, and sought to move into screenwriting with consulting help from Richard Siegel who was a copywriter at Bozell. The trio wrote a screenplay over the course of nine months during their free time and crafted Stay Tuned, about a depressed television addict who makes a deal with the Devil and is pulled into his TV set and encounters a series of TV themed nightmares.

In April 1990, the script was purchased by Morgan Creek Entertainment and Warner Bros. for $750,000. The script marked the second creative effort for Jennewein and Parker after leaving advertising with the duo having previously published a parody magazine of the trade magazine Adweek titled Madweek.

Tim Burton was originally chosen to be the director on account of his art and style, but left to direct Batman Returns.

Robert Zemeckis, Joe Dante, and Joe Johnston were considered as potential choices to direct the film. Peter Hyams lobbied Morgan Creek for the opportunity to direct the film as he'd always wanted to make a film with Spielbergian elements and Morgan Creek hired him in Spring of 1991 to direct due to his enthusiasm for the film. Dan Aykroyd was initially considered for the role of Roy Knable, but due to the massive demands required by the production to create the various Hellivision environments it was decided to go with leads who were more affordable leading to the casting of John Ritter and Pam Dawber. Filming began in October 1991 at The Bridge Studios in Burnaby, British Columbia with additional filming taking place in Old Tucson Studios in Tucson, Arizona.

Initially the Saturday Nite Dead section of the film featuring a sketch parodying Wayne's World called Duane's Underworld was supposed to feature Mike Myers and Dana Carvey of Wayne's World in a cameo appearance, but the two were heavily involved in the post-production and promotion of the movie Wayne's World and ultimately passed on appearing.

=== Animated sequence ===
Chuck Jones Productions produced the animated sequence in which Roy and Helen are transformed into cartoon mice, which was directed by Jeff DeGrandis and co-directed by Chuck Jones. Jones himself designed the models for the Knables' caricatures, provided character pose layouts and approved DeGrandis' storyboarding. The sequence was produced in the United States at a cost of about $800,000 and took six months and a team of five full-time and seven freelance animators. Segment producer and executive of Chuck Jones Productions Steven Leiva said when they were coordinating with Hyams, they requested their team have the freedom to design appealing cartoon mice with the mannerisms and movements of the Knables rather than capturing their portrayers' likenesses, to which Hyams agreed and the team was allowed a high level of autonomy. During test screenings, audiences routinely singled out this sequence as their favorite part of the film.

== Release ==
The film was theatrically released on August 14, 1992. A home video release followed on January 6, 1993.

== Reception ==
The film was not screened for film critics. The film holds a 47% approval rating on Rotten Tomatoes from 17 reviews, with an average score of 4.6/10. On Metacritic, the film has a score of 41 out of 100, based on 16 critics, indicating "mixed or average reviews".

Stephen Holden of The New York Times called the film a "cleverly plotted movie" based on a "nifty satiric concept" but said that "most of its takeoffs ... show no feel for genre and no genuine wit." Rita Kempley of The Washington Post called the film "wonderfully silly" and a "zippy action spoof." Variety reported the film was "not diabolical enough for true black comedy, too scary and violent for kids lured by its PG rating and witless in its sendup of obsessive TV viewing...a picture with nothing for everybody"; it noted that the "six-minute cartoon interlude by the masterful Chuck Jones, with Ritter and Dawber portrayed as mice menaced by a robot cat...has a grace and depth sorely lacking in the rest of the movie." Time Out called it "pointless 'satire'" with the "emotional depth of a 30-second soap commercial."

=== Box office ===
Stay Tuned opened at #6 in the US, which the Los Angeles Times called a "fuzzy reception". The film grossed $10.7 million in the US and Canada and grossed only $1 million internationally for a worldwide total of $12 million.

== Television adaptation ==
In August 2020, it was reported that AMC Studios was developing a television series adaptation of the film with Ian B. Goldberg and Richard Naing as writers, a part of Goldberg's overall deal at AMC Studios. In July 2025, Hulu announced that they would develop the show, with Josh Gad and Andrew Rannells headlining the series. Akiva Goldsman, Jordan Cahan, and Greg Lessans are credited as creators, with Cahan serving as showrunner.

== Soundtrack ==
Stay Tuned: Music from and Inspired by the Motion Picture

Soundtrack album by Various artists
- Released: August 29, 1992
- Recorded: 1992
- Genre: Hip hop
- Length: 35:39
- Label: Morgan Creek
- Producers: Hurby Luv Bug; Full Force; Black Sheep; Jason Hunter; Ced Gee; LaVaba Mallison

The soundtrack to the film is made up entirely of hip hop songs with the exception of the last two tracks, which were themes composed by Bruce Broughton. Tracks in bold are used in the movie.

=== Track listing ===
No.	Title	Artist	Length
1.	"**Start Me Up**"	Salt-n-Pepa	4:45
2.	"The Choice Is Yours"	Black Sheep	3:22
3.	"**Taste**"	Auto & Cherokee	4:07
4.	"Xodus"	X-Clan	4:22
5.	"Strobelite Honey"	Black Sheep	3:07
6.	"Message From the Boss"	Ultramagnetic MCs	4:47
7.	"**The Mic Stalker**"	Doctor Ice	2:57
8.	"**Bad, Bad, Bad**"	Kool Moe Dee	4:48
9.	"**Darryl's Dad**"	Bruce Broughton	1:17
10.	"**Stay Tuned (Main Theme)**"	Bruce Broughton	2:07

=== Score album ===
Broughton's score was released in 2011 by Intrada Records.

No.	Title	Length
1.	"Main Title"	2:57
2.	"Meet Darryl"	1:03
3.	"The Dish"	2:56
4.	"A Bumpy Ride"	2:12
5.	"Sayonara, Mrs. Seidenbaum"	0:33
6.	"Field Work"	0:55
7.	"Gordon Bashing"	2:04
8.	"It Ate My BMX"	2:01
9.	"Wolf Attack"	0:45
10.	"That's My Bike!"	2:53
11.	"Offering to Help"	1:47
12.	"You Have Tits"	1:35
13.	"Aim The Dish"	0:30
14.	"Off With Your Wig"	3:34
15.	"Darryl Breaks Through"	0:52
16.	"Redemption"	1:31
17.	"Roy Goes Back"	1:10
18.	"The 3:10 to Yuma"	1:55
19.	"Roy Gets Shot"	0:53
20.	"Crashing In"	0:32
21.	"The Big Sword Fight"	1:19
22.	"Turn It Off!"	1:50
23.	"So What Can I Tell You..."	0:53
24.	"The Game Show"	1:29
25.	"TV Theme Medley"	3:32
26.	"Roy Knable, Private Dick"	3:26
27.	"We're Cartoons"	6:42

== See also ==
- "Treehouse of Horror IX"
- Buddy (2026)
- I Saw the TV Glow (2024)
- Mr. Crocket (2024)
