= Sure Shot Redemption =

Studio album by Dres
- Released: May 4, 1999
- Recorded: 1995–1999
- Genre: Hip Hop
- Label: Ground Control
- Producers: Bill Baren; Steve Pina

Sure Shot Redemption is the debut solo album by the Black Sheep member Dres. It was released in 1999 through Ground Control Records.

== Critical reception ==
Exclaim! wrote that Dres's "voice still boasts a suave demeanour and shines on jazzy selections 'As I Look Back' and 'Hi & Lo', but his lyrical content is now reflective and spiritual; no strobe light honeys here." Miami New Times thought that "on slower songs like 'As I Look Back' and 'Hi & Lo', Dres unveils the wise man that always seemed nascent in Black Sheep's wiseass tone."

== Track listing ==
1. "Pardon Me" (Single)
2. "As I Look Back"
3. "Damn Right"
4. "Hi & Lo"
5. "Never Say" (featuring the Legion)
6. "Start of Somethin' Big"
7. "Sky's the Limit" (featuring the Legion)
8. "Endz"
9. "It's Going Down" (featuring Chi-Ali and Droop Dog)
10. "Back 2 Back"
11. "You're So Vain" (featuring Horace Brown)
12. "Night Time" (featuring Vicki Miles)
13. "Grand Groove"
14. "Straight Paper"
15. "Tru Kings"
