= Non-Fiction (Black Sheep album) =

Studio album by Black Sheep
- Released: December 6, 1994
- Recorded: December 1993 – September 1994
- Studios: Calliope (New York, NY); D&D (New York, NY); Chung King (New York, NY); The Hit Factory (New York, NY)
- Genre: East Coast hip-hop
- Length: 1:14:42
- Label: Mercury
- Producer: Black Sheep

Black Sheep chronology
A Wolf in Sheep's Clothing (1991)	Non-Fiction (1994)	8WM/Novakane (2006)

Singles from Non-Fiction
- 1. "Without a Doubt" Released: 1994; 2. "North South East West" Released: 1995

Professional ratings
Review scores
Source	Rating
AllMusic	2/5 stars
Rap Pages	7/10
The Source	3.5/5 stars

Non-Fiction is the second studio album by American hip-hop duo Black Sheep. It was released on December 6, 1994, via Mercury Records. The recording sessions took place at Calliope Studios, D&D Studios, Chung King Studios, and The Hit Factory, in New York City. The album was produced by Black Sheep, with Salaam Remi serving as an additional producer on the remix version of "Without a Doubt". It features guest appearances from Emage, Chi-Ali, Michelle Valentine, Showbiz and A.G., Sweet Tee, and the Legion. The album debuted at number 107 on the Billboard 200 and number 24 on the Top R&B/Hip-Hop Albums in the United States.

The album spawned two minor hip-hop hits: "Without a Doubt" and "North, South, East, West". Its lead single, "Without a Doubt", topped both the Hot R&B/Hip-Hop Songs and Hot Rap Songs and reached number 3 on the Hot Dance Music/Maxi-Singles Sales. The second single from the album, "North, South, East, West", made it to number 22 on the Hot R&B/Hip-Hop Songs, number 18 on the Hot Rap Songs and number 14 on the Hot Dance Music/Maxi-Singles Sales.

== Track listing ==
No.	Title	Writer(s)	Length
1.	"Non-Fiction Intro"	Andres Titus; William McLean	1:27
2.	"Autobiographical"	Titus; McLean	5:30
3.	"B.B.S." (featuring Emage)	Titus; McLean; Sonny Phillips	4:04
4.	"City Lights"	Titus; McLean	4:08
5.	"Do Your Thing"	Titus; McLean	5:23
6.	"E.F.F.E.C.T." (featuring Showbiz and A.G.)	Titus; McLean; Rodney LeMay; Andre Barnes	4:48
7.	"Freak Y' All" (featuring Chi-Ali)	Titus; McLean	4:54
8.	"Gotta Get Up"	Titus; McLean; Julian Edwin Adderley; Nathaniel Adderley; Diane Lampert	4:49
9.	"Let's Get Cozy"	Titus; McLean	4:09
10.	"Me & My Brother"	Titus; McLean	4:29
11.	"North South East West"	Titus; McLean	3:44
12.	"Peace to the Niggas"	Titus; McLean	4:44
13.	"Summa tha Time" (featuring Emage and Michelle Valentine)	Titus; McLean	4:37
14.	"We Boys" (featuring the Legion)	Titus; McLean; J. Adderley; N. Adderley; Lampert	5:54
15.	"Who's Next?" (featuring Sweet Tee)	Titus; McLean; Toi Jackson; Alphonse Mouzon	5:24
16.	"Without a Doubt"	Titus; McLean; Ronald Isley; Rudolph Isley; Marvin Isley; Ernie Isley; O'Kelly Isley Jr.; Chris Jasper	4:06
17.	"Non-Fiction Outro"	Titus; McLean	2:32
Total length:			1:14:42

Sample credits

- Track 2 contains a sample of "Free Like the Wind" performed by Sonny Phillips.
- Track 8 contains a sample of "Hundred an' One Year/M'Ria" performed by Cannonball Adderley.
- Track 9 contains a sample of "La Di Da Di" written by Ricky Walters and Doug E. Fresh, performed by Slick Rick.
- Track 14 contains a sample of "Broomstick" performed by Cannonball Adderley.
- Track 15 contains a sample of "Poobli" performed by Alphonse Mouzon.

== Charts ==
Chart (1994)	Peak position
US Billboard 200	107
US Top R&B/Hip-Hop Albums (Billboard)	24
