= Smith Street Line =

Smith Street Line refers to the following transit lines:

- Smith Street Line (surface) in Brooklyn.
- IND Smith Street Line in Brooklyn, part of the Culver Line
