= Dres (rapper) =

American rapper

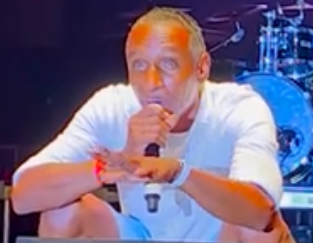
- Dres performing in 2023

Background information
- Also known as: Dres
- Born: Andres Vargas-Titus
- Origin: Queens, New York, U.S.
- Genre: Hip hop
- Occupations: Rapper, actor
- Years active: 1989–present
- Labels: Mercury/PolyGram Records; Ground Control Records; Tommy Boy Entertainment
- Member of: Black Sheep

Andres "Dres" Vargas-Titus is an American hip hop artist. He is known for being the lead rapper of the alternative hip hop duo Black Sheep, before recording as a solo artist.

== Career ==
Mista Lawnge formed Black Sheep in 1989 with Dres as the rapper. Their first appearance together was on De La Soul's 1991 album De La Soul Is Dead. Dres was featured on the track "Fanatic of the B Word". Their first album, A Wolf in Sheep's Clothing, was released in 1991 and featured the singles "Flavor of the Month", "The Choice Is Yours", "Strobelite Honey", and "Similak Child". Due to the lackluster sales of their second album, Non-Fiction, Dres and Mista Lawnge decided to take a break and started independent projects not as Black Sheep. In 1999, credited as Dres the Black Sheep, Dres released a solo album titled Sure Shot Redemption. In 2000, Black Sheep reunited and recorded the EP, Redlight, Greenlight, and the title track of the film Once in the Life. In 2006, Dres released another solo album titled 8WM/Novakane. In 2009, Dres released an EP titled From the Black Pool of Genius: the Prelude, in preparation for his solo LP From the Black Pool of Genius, which was released June 2010.

== Personal life ==
Dres was raised in the Astoria Houses in the Astoria section of Queens, NY, and the Bland Houses (commonly known as "The Bland") in the Flushing section of Queens, NY. His family later moved to North Carolina.

His son is the artist Honor Titus.

Dres is of African American and Puerto Rican descent.

== Solo discography ==
=== Albums ===
Album information
Sure Shot Redemption
- Released: May 4, 1999
- RIAA Certification:
- Billboard 200 chart position: #74
- R&B/Hip-Hop chart position:
- Singles: "Pardon Me"
From the Black Pool of Genius: the Prelude
- Released: December 2009
From the Black Pool of Genius
- Released: June 2010

=== Featured tracks ===
- "Fanatic of the B Word" by De La Soul, from the 1991 album De La Soul Is Dead.
- "Work to Do" by Vanessa L. Williams, from the 1991 album The Comfort Zone.
- "Mr. Boops" by Resident Alien, from the 1991 single "Mr. Boops".
- "On the Wall" from the 1992 Trespass (soundtrack).
- "Check It Out" by Fu-Schnickens, from the 1992 album F.U. Don't Take It Personal.
- "Let the Horns Blow" by Chi Ali, from the 1992 album The Fabulous Chi-Ali.
- "State of Yo" by The Brand New Heavies, from the 1992 album Heavy Rhyme Experience, Vol. 1.
- "Roll wit tha Flava" by the Flavor Unit MCs, from the 1993 album Roll wit tha Flava.
- "En Focus" by De La Soul, from the 1993 album Buhloone Mindstate.
- "Jingle Jangle" by The Legion, from their 1994 album Theme + Echo = Krill.
- "React with a Mic" by Twista, from his 1994 album Resurrection
- "We Shall Not Be Moved" by Sounds of Blackness, from the 1995 Panther (soundtrack).
- "First...and Then" by Handsome Boy Modeling School, from the 2004 album White People.
- "Foolin' Around" by Rhymefest, from his 2008 mixtape Man in the Mirror.
- "Back on the Scene" by Slaughterhouse, from its 2011 Slaughterhouse EP

== Filmography ==
- Who's the Man? (1993) as Malik
- Once in the Life (2000) as Hector
- "Words Up!" a CBS Schoolbreak Special, Season 10, Episode 2 (1992) as Aeschylus

== See also ==
- Native Tongues
