= James A. Bland =

American musician (1854–1911)

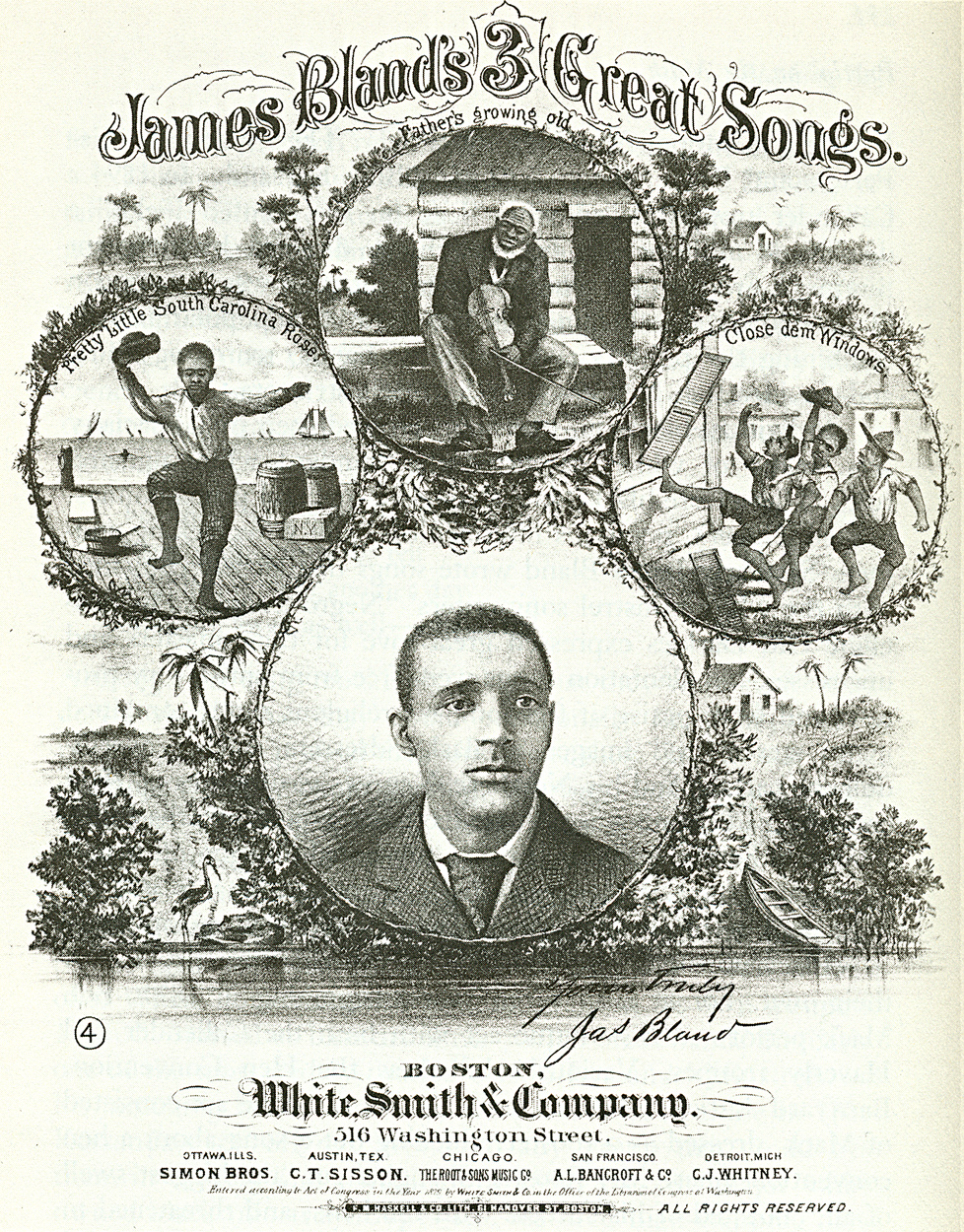
Sheet music cover for "James Bland's 3 Great Songs", 1879.

James Alan Bland (October 22, 1854 – May 5, 1911) was an African American musician, songwriter, and minstrel performer. He is considered the first popular Black composer in the United States, and is best known for the song "Carry Me Back to Old Virginny" which was the official state song of Virginia from 1940 to 1997.

== Biography ==
Designations

Pennsylvania Historical Marker
- Type: City
- Criteria: African American, Music & Theater, Performers
- Designated: September 26, 1961
- Location: Bryn Mawr Ave. & W Rock Hill Rd., at Merion Meml. Park entrance, Bala Cynwyd
- Marker Text: Buried in this cemetery is the famous minstrel, composer of "Carry Me Back to Old Virginny" and many other songs. Born on Long Island in 1854, he traveled widely but died in obscurity at Philadelphia in 1911.

Bland was one of eight children born in Flushing, New York, to a free family. His father Allen was one of the first African Americans to graduate college (Wilberforce University). Beginning with an $8 banjo purchased by his father, he began performing professionally by age 14.

Bland was educated in Washington, DC. He attended Howard University, but was forced to leave in 1873 because of his involvement with theatrical shows, which was forbidden to the institution's students at the time. He wrote over 700 songs, including "In the Morning in the Bright Light" (1879), "In the Evening by the Moonlight" (1879), "Oh, Dem Golden Slippers" (1879) (the theme song for the long-running Philadelphia Mummers Parade), "Hand Me Down My Walking Cane" (1880) and "De Golden Wedding" (1880). His best-known song is "Carry Me Back to Old Virginny" (1878), which, in a slightly modified form, was the official State Song of Virginia from 1940 to 1997. It was retired and designated "state song emeritus" in the latter year because of controversy over its lyrics.

Often called "The World's Greatest Minstrel Man", Bland toured the United States, as well as Europe. Bland's earliest recorded minstrel performance was with the Original Black Diamonds of Boston in 1875. Beginning in 1881, he spent 20 years in London before returning to the United States. Bland toured Europe in the early 1880s with Haverly's Genuine Colored Minstrels and remained in England to perform as a singer/banjo player without blackface. Appearing as "The Prince of Negro Songwriters," he was invited to give command performances for Queen Victoria and the Prince of Wales. Music historian Alec Wilder calls Bland the black writer who "broke down the barriers to white music publishers' offices." Bland was one of the most prolific minstrel composers of all time; he is reputed to have written over six hundred songs, though only about fifty were published under his name.

Bland spent his later years in obscurity. He died from tuberculosis on May 5, 1911, in Philadelphia, Pennsylvania. Bland was buried in an unmarked grave without a funeral at Merion Memorial Park, Bala Cynwyd, Pennsylvania.

In 1939, his grave was found by American Society of Composers, Authors and Publishers (ASCAP) with the assistance of the editor of The Etude magazine, James Francis Cooke. His grave was landscaped and a monument was erected. The Lions Club of Virginia also assisted in this effort.

The Lions Clubs of Virginia sponsor a music contest for school students called the "Bland Contest" in honor of James A. Bland. The Annual Bland Music Scholarships Program was established in 1948 to assist and promote cultural and educational opportunities for the musically talented youth of Virginia.

Bland was inducted into the Songwriters Hall of Fame in 1970. The Bland Houses and the James A. Bland Playground, both in Flushing, Queens, are named after him. A separate housing project in Alexandria, Virginia, is also named for Bland.

== Sources ==
- Carry Me Back to old Virginny webpage, Lions Club
- Lions Clubs of Virginia – Bland Music Scholarships Program
- Bland Houses
