= The Choice Is Yours (Revisited) =

Single by Black Sheep

from the album A Wolf in Sheep's Clothing
- Released: October 29, 1991
- Genre: Golden age hip-hop; alternative hip-hop; jazz rap
- Length: 4:03
- Label: Mercury; PolyGram
- Songwriters: James E. Alexander; Ben Cauley; Allen Jones; William McLean; John R Smith; Andres Titus
- Producer: Black Sheep

Music video
- "The Choice Is Yours" on YouTube

"The Choice Is Yours (Revisited)" is a song by the Native Tongues affiliate Black Sheep, from their debut album A Wolf in Sheep's Clothing.

== Samples ==
The track samples "Big Sur Suite" by Johnny Hammond Smith from his album Higher Ground.

== Track listing ==
A-side

1. "The Choice Is Yours (Revisited)" - 4:03 [not available on vinyl LP release]
2. "The Choice Is Yours" (Radio Mix) - 3:23

B-side

1. "Have U.N.E. Pull" (Remix) - 3:38
2. "Yes (Everything's OK)" - 3:20 [not available on vinyl LP release]

== Charts ==
Chart (1991–1992)	Peak position
U.S. Billboard Hot 100	57
U.S. Hot R&B Singles	21
U.S. Hot Rap Singles	1
U.S. Hot Dance Music	6

== In popular culture ==
- The song was featured prominently at the first Olympic breakdancing event at the 2024 Summer Olympics.
- The song was featured in a commercial for the 2010 Kia Soul. The song was also featured in a JCPenney commercial from 2005.
- A new rerecording of the song was created for a Venmo ad campaign in 2025, with the original lyrics changed from "You can get with this, or you can get with that" to "You can Venmo this, or you can Venmo that." Original lyricist Andres "Dres" Titus returned for the track and the music was reproduced by Samuel “Tone” Barnes of the Trackmasters.
- The song appears in the movies Spider-Man: Into the Spider-Verse,Transformers: Rise of the Beasts,The Beanie Bubble,Dope, You Got Served,Step Up,Lakeview Terrace, and Fanboys.
- The song has appeared in television episodes of Power Book III: Raising Kanan,Fresh Off the Boat,Surviving Jack and You.
- The song appears in the video games Aggressive Inline,NBA Street Vol. 2, and True Crime: New York City. The original mix is featured in Major League Baseball 2K10.
