= Bland Houses =

Public housing development in Queens, New York

- NYCHA Property
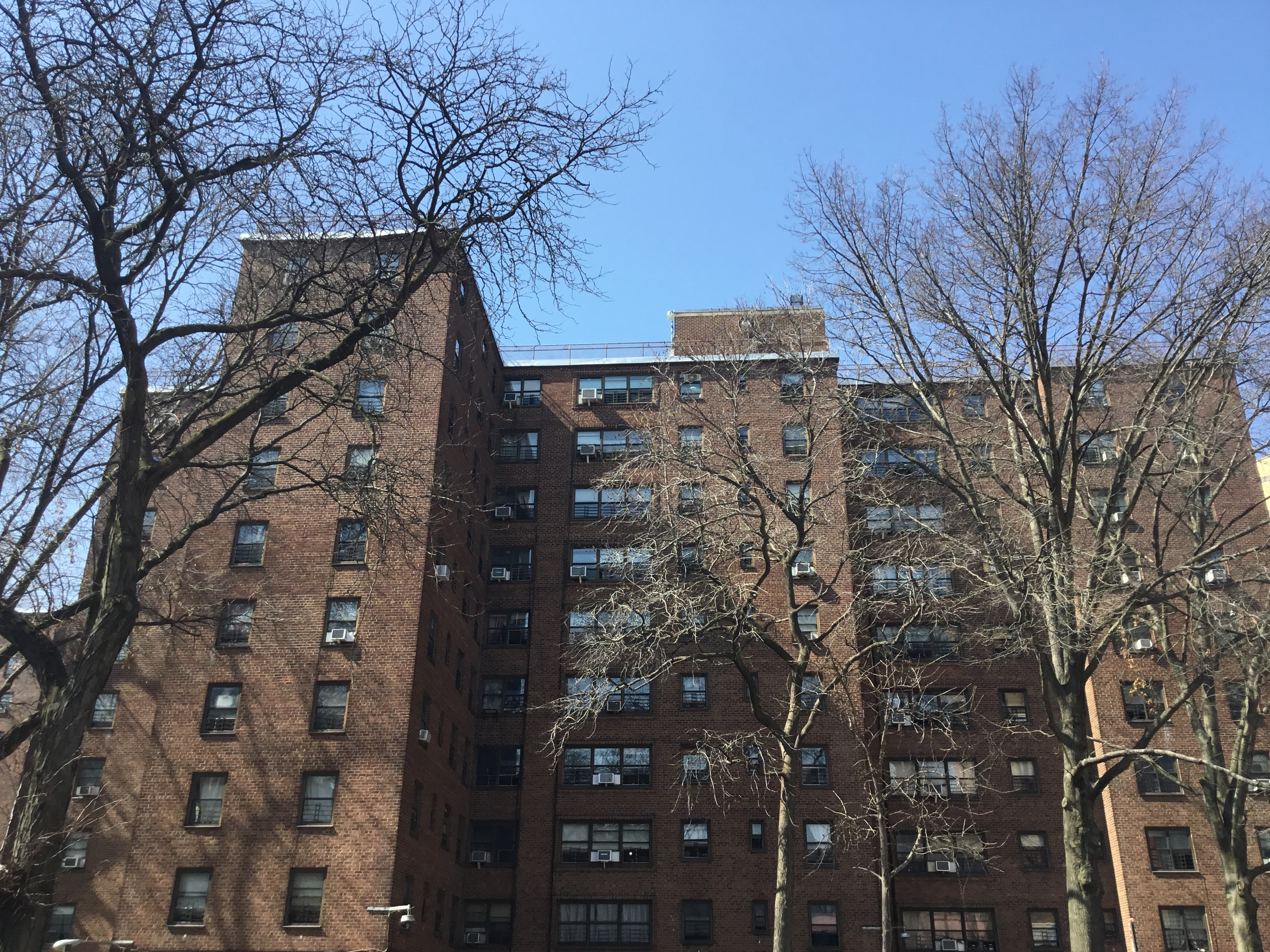
- Interactive map of Bland Houses
- Country: United States
- State: New York
- City: New York City
- Borough: Queens

Area
  - Total: 5.7 acres (2.3 ha)

Population
  - Total: 730
- Zip Code: 11354

The Bland Houses is a NYCHA housing project that consists of 5 buildings containing 10 stories in each building. It is located between Roosevelt and 41st Avenues and also between College Point Boulevard and Prince Street in Flushing, Queens. It is also located near the Flushing–Main Street station on the IRT Flushing Line and the Flushing–Main Street station on the LIRR Port Washington Branch.

== History ==
Originally called the Flushing Houses, the project was renamed in 1951 after composer James A. Bland, who was born in Flushing and grew up on Prince Street. The cornerstone for the housing project was laid on July 27, 1951 and construction was completed in May 1952. The complex was designed by the architectural firm of Chapman, Evans & Delehanty. The James A. Bland Playground opened adjacent to the site in 1953.

The Renovation of the Façades were completed in July 2025 along with Clinton, Douglass, East River, Thomas Apartments, and Washington as part of the NYCHA's Infrastructure Upgrade Project for $1.2B across all 5 boroughs of the Tri-State area.

== See also ==
- New York City Housing Authority
