= A Wolf in Sheep's Clothing (Black Sheep album) =

Studio album by Black Sheep
- Released: October 22, 1991
- Recorded: November 1990 – August 1991
- Genre: East Coast hip-hop
- Length: 70:40
- Label: Mercury
- Producers: William McLean; Dres

Black Sheep chronology
A Wolf in Sheep's Clothing (1991)	Non-Fiction (1994)

Singles from A Wolf in Sheep's Clothing
- 1. "Flavor of the Month" Released: September 23, 1991; 2. "The Choice Is Yours" Released: October 29, 1991; 3. "Strobelite Honey" Released: December 28, 1991; 4. "Similak Child" Released: March 3, 1992

A Wolf in Sheep's Clothing is the debut studio album from American hip-hop duo Black Sheep, released October 22, 1991, on Mercury Records. The duo supported the album with a North American tour that included the Soup Dragons, Tom Tom Club, and James.

The album peaked at number 30 on the Billboard 200 chart. By April 1992, it was certified gold in sales by the RIAA, after sales exceeding 500,000 copies in the United States.

== Release and reception ==
Professional ratings
Review scores
Source	Rating
AllMusic	5/5 stars
Entertainment Weekly	A
RapReviews	7/10
The Rolling Stone Album Guide	4/5 stars
The Village Voice	(choice cut)

The album peaked at thirty on the U.S. Billboard 200 and reached the fifteenth spot on the R&B Albums chart. It was certified gold in April 1992.

John Bush of AllMusic called the album "playfully satirical, witty, and incredibly imaginative," and stated that "Black Sheep hit a height with their debut that few hip-hop acts would ever reach."

In 1998, the album was selected as one of The Source's "100 Best Rap Albums". In 2022, Rolling Stone placed it at number 146 on their list of the "200 Greatest Hip-Hop Albums of All Time".

== Track listing ==
All music is composed by W. McLean and A. Titus except where noted.

No.	Title	Music	Length
1.	"Intro"		0:49
2.	"U Mean I'm Not"		1:25
3.	"Butt... In the Meantime"		4:13
4.	"Have U.N.E. Pull"		3:48
5.	"Strobelite Honey"		3:05
6.	"Are You Mad?"		0:43
7.	"The Choice Is Yours"		3:23
8.	"To Whom It May Concern"		4:04
9.	"Similak Child"		4:27
10.	"Try Counting Sheep"	Cornelius Grant, Edward Holland, Jr., McLean, Titus, Cornelius Whitfield	4:24
11.	"Flavor of the Month"		4:17
12.	"La Menage" (feat. Q-Tip)	McLean, Q-Tip, Titus	3:23
13.	"L.A.S.M."	McLean, Jennifer Perry, Titus, Gwen Watts	2:12
14.	"Gimme the Finga"		4:25
15.	"Hoes We Knows"		4:20
16.	"Go to Hail"		1:02
17.	"Black with N.V. (No Vision)"		3:56
18.	"Pass the 40" (feat. Chi-Ali)	Chi-Ali, Dave Gossett, Joe Jones, Clifton Lighty, McLean, Titus	4:46
19.	"Blunted 10"		1:56
20.	"For Doz That Slept"	Jackson, Klein, McLean, Titus	2:39
21.	"The Choice Is Yours (Revisited)"		4:03
22.	"Yes"		3:20

== Chart history ==
=== Weekly charts ===
Chart (1991–1992)	Peak position
US Billboard 200	30
US Top R&B/Hip-Hop Albums (Billboard)	15

=== Year-end charts ===
Chart (1992)	Position
US Billboard 200	98
US Top R&B/Hip-Hop Albums (Billboard)	31

=== Singles ===
Year	Single	Peak chart positions				
Year	Single	U.S. Billboard Hot 100	U.S. Dance Music/Club Play Singles	U.S. Hot Dance Music/Maxi-Singles Sales	U.S. Hot R&B/Hip-Hop Singles & Tracks	U.S. Hot Rap Singles
1991	"Flavor of the Month"	—N/a	—N/a	18	—N/a	2
1991	"The Choice Is Yours"	57	9	6	21	1
1991	"Strobelite Honey"	80	1	4	—N/a	5
1992	"Similak Child"	—N/a	—N/a	44	—N/a	—N/a

== Personnel ==
- William McLean, Andre Titus – arranging & production
- Lisle Leete – engineering
- Lisa Cortes, Dave Gossett – executive production
- Tom Coyne – mastering
- Gregg Mann, W. McLean, A. Titus – mixing
- Angelique Bellamny – vocals
- Chi-Ali – vocals (background)
