= B75 (New York City bus) =

Former bus route in Brooklyn, New York

The Smith Street Line was a public transit line in Brooklyn, New York City, running mostly along Ninth Street and Smith Street between Park Slope and Downtown Brooklyn. Originally a streetcar line, and later the B75, it is now split between two bus routes: the B57 (Cobble Hill section) and the B61 (Park Slope section). The B67, which supplemented service in Downtown Brooklyn along Jay Street before the elimination of the B75, continues to serve that section of the route. The B61 is operated by MTA New York City Bus' Jackie Gleason Depot in Sunset Park, and the B57 is dispatched from the Grand Avenue Depot in Maspeth, Queens.

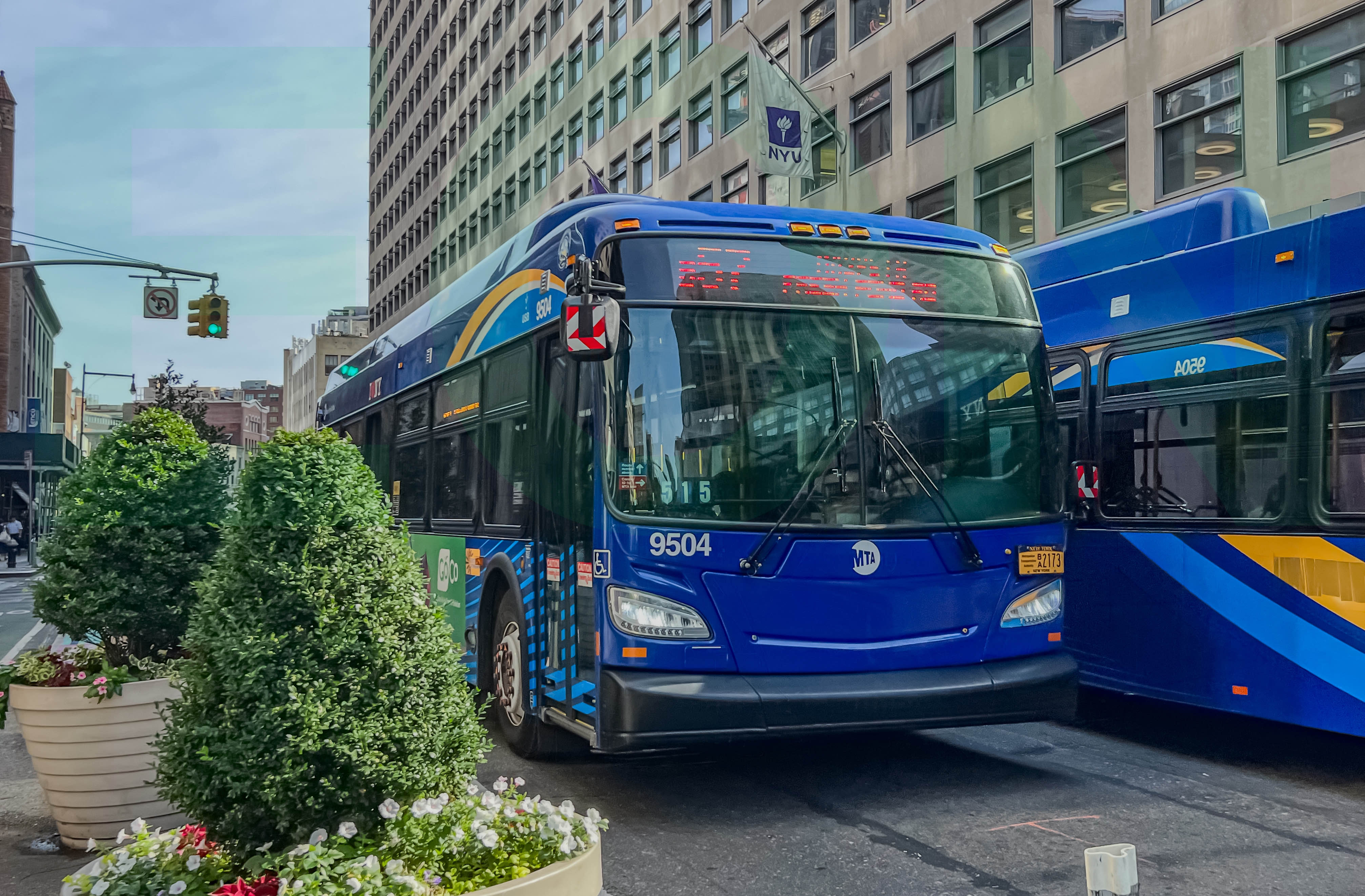
A 2018 XDE40 (9504) on the Maspeth-bound B57 in July 2024

== History ==
The entire line, along Prospect Park West, 9th Street, and Smith Street from the 9th Avenue Depot was originally on 15th Street beyond the city line. It starts from downtown Brooklyn, through Fulton Ferry—and was opened in June 1862 by the Coney Island and Brooklyn Railroad. The Coney Island and Brooklyn Railroad acquired the line at some point, and by 1897 it passes through the Coney Island Avenue Line (leaving the line to the 9th Avenue Depot at Prospect Park Southwest). Buses were substituted for streetcars on February 11, 1951, and at some point southbound traffic was moved from Smith Street to Court Street, replacing the Court Street Line (which had been part of the Myrtle Avenue Line).

In 2010, because of budget cuts, the B75 was eliminated. The neighboring B77, which ran from Red Hook to 5th Avenue via 9th Street, was also eliminated. The Cobble Hill Section (Court and Smith Streets) was replaced by an extended B57, while the Park Slope (9th Street) section was replaced by an extended B61. This also absorbed the B77, providing a one-seat ride from Park Slope to Red Hook, and the Columbia Street Waterfront. The B67 continues to serve the Downtown Brooklyn section to Jay Street and Sands Street.

== In popular culture ==
In the 2000 film Requiem for a Dream, two characters are seen hugging at a B75 bus stop.
