= Chi-Ali =

American rapper Actor & Writer

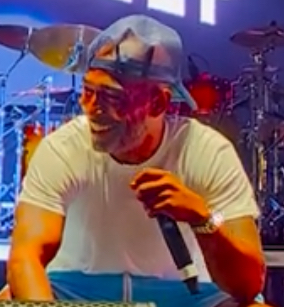
- Chi-Ali performing in 2023

Background information
- Born: Chi-Ali Griffith; May 27, 1976 (age 50)
- Origin: The Bronx, New York City, U.S.
- Genres: Hip hop
- Instrument: Vocals
- Member of: Native Tongues

Chi-Ali Griffith (born May 27, 1976), better known by his stage name Chi-Ali, is an American rapper from The Bronx, best known for his debut album, The Fabulous Chi-Ali, released in 1992, and as a member of hip-hop collective Native Tongues.

== Music career ==
Chi-Ali made his first appearance on Black Sheep's debut album, A Wolf In Sheep's Clothing, on the posse cut "Pass the 40". Chi Ali at the time was a core member of Native Tongues, a New York City-based hip-hop collective, and also had connections with the Legion family, along with Showbiz and A.G.

In 1992, Chi-Ali released his first solo single, "Age Ain't Nothing But a #", which was a moderate hit and reached No. 6 on the Hot Rap Singles chart. The song was popular on urban radio stations, and the music video received good rotation on Yo! MTV Raps and Rap City. The album in which the song was featured, The Fabulous Chi-Ali, was released shortly thereafter, which yielded two other singles: "Roadrunner" and "Funky Lemonade," which were both remixed and re-recorded.

Chi-Ali seemingly disappeared from the hip hop industry until the late 1990s, when he appeared on Dres's solo album, Sure Shot Redemption, and began occasionally appearing on the work of other artists. Chi Ali collaborated with Jadakiss on a song entitled "G-Check".

A documentary chronicling Chi's life titled The Fabulous Chi Ali was released in 2019.

== Manslaughter conviction ==
On January 14, 2000, Griffith shot and killed Sean Raymond during an argument in the Throggs Neck area of The Bronx, New York City. Raymond was the brother of Griffith's girlfriend at the time. Griffith fled New York City and was charged with first degree manslaughter as well as various lesser charges. An extensive manhunt resulted, with Griffith twice featured on the TV program America's Most Wanted. Griffith hid in numerous East Coast cities until he was apprehended on March 5, 2001, in New York City, and was subsequently convicted of the killing of Sean Raymond, and served 12 years of a 14-year sentence at Sing Sing Correctional Facility.

== Discography ==
| Year | Title | Chart positions | |
| Year | Title | U.S. Billboard 200 | U.S. Heatseekers |
|---|---|---|---|
| 1992 | The Fabulous Chi-Ali: Released: March 24, 1992; Label: Violator/Relativity | 189 | 8 |

== Filmography ==
| Year | Title | Role | Notes |
|---|---|---|---|
| 1993 | Strapped | Pharoah Dodson | Television film |
| 2019 | The Fabulous Chi Ali | Himself | Documentary |

== Publications ==
- Chi Ali Griffith (2019). Another Kind of Freedom. Chi Ali Publishing. ISBN 978-0-5784-3646-3.
