= Clinton Houses =

Public housing development in Manhattan, New York

- NYCHA property
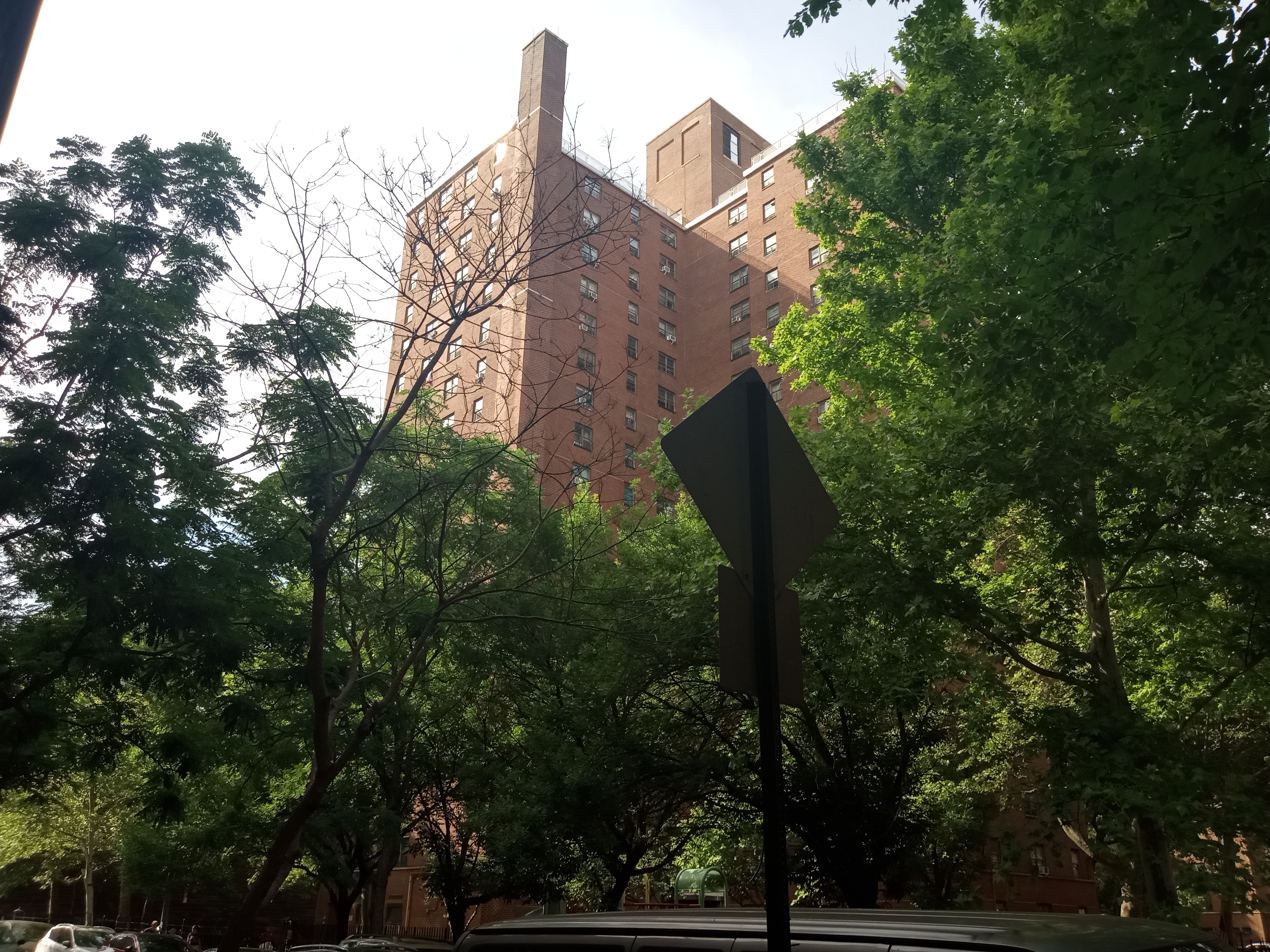
- Interactive map of Clinton Houses
- Coordinates: 40.7945°N 73.9456°W
- Country: United States
- State: New York
- City: New York City
- Borough: Manhattan

Area
  - Total: 0.008 sq mi (0.021 km^{2})

Population
  - Total: 1,749
  - Density: 220,000/sq mi (84,000/km^{2})
- ZIP codes: 10029
- Area codes: 212, 332, 646, and 917
- Website: my.nycha.info/DevPortal/

Governor DeWitt Clinton Houses, also known as DeWitt Clinton Houses or Clinton Houses, is a public housing development built and maintained by the New York City Housing Authority (NYCHA) in the East Harlem neighborhood of Manhattan. Clinton Houses is composed of six buildings, resting on a non-continuous campus with an area of 5.6 acres (23,000 m^{2}). Five of those (I-V) are 18 stories high, and another (VI) is nine stories high. The six buildings have a total of 749 apartments, which house 1,823 people. Clinton Houses occupies the two blocks that are bordered by East 110th Street to the north, Lexington Avenue to the east, Park Avenue to the west, and East 108th Street to the south. It also occupies the western half of the two blocks that are bordered by East 106th Street to the north, Lexington Avenue to the east, Park Avenue to the west, and East 104th Street to the south, with the exception of a small part along East 106th Street.

== About ==
The Housing Committee's proposals for the development were held in 1959. At the hearing Jane Jacobs accused NYCHA of discriminating against the poor through displacement and embracing architecture oriented for middle-class need, advocating instead for retaining the social structure of the community by mixing low-rise buildings in with typical high-rises.

The Clinton Houses were designed by Perkins and Will and partially funded federally. It was one of the first vest-pocket properties which retained the city's street grid in response to Jacobs but was in the tower-in-the-park style to supply light and air. The development was completed on October 31, 1965. The development was named after DeWitt Clinton (1769-1828), who served as Mayor of New York City and Governor of New York. As mayor, Clinton fought for free public education, to remove voting restrictions from Catholics, and public welfare. As governor, he helped found the New York public school system, and introduced a bill into the New York State Senate to build a canal connecting the Northeastern United States with the Great Lakes via Lake Erie.

In 2014, tenants of the Clinton Houses sued NYCHA for negligence resulting in disrepair and public health hazards.

Sylvia Velazquez was serving as the Resident Association President for Clinton Houses, and was a member of the Manhattan North District Citywide Council of Presidents. Manhattan Community Board 11 governs Spanish Harlem, the neighborhood where Clinton Houses is.

== See also ==
- New York City Housing Authority
