= Greenpoint and Williamsburgh Railroad =

The Greenpoint & Williamsburgh Railroad was a streetcar line that operated in and around the City of Brooklyn, in the U.S. state of New York.

The G&WRR was chartered on April 23, 1864, under Chapter 323 of the Laws of 1864, by Mr. Archibald K. Meserole & Associates, as a general railroad. Capitalization was $100,000, and it had an unspecified authorized corporate life. The legislative grant awarded the following route: From Newtown Creek via Manhattan Avenue, Driggs Avenue, South 8 Street, Kent Avenue, North 4 Street, Driggs Avenue & return, now the northern end of the B43 (New York City bus) line.

== History ==
To cement the charter route, a franchise was applied for, which was granted by the City of Brooklyn on February 29, 1864.

Archibald Meserole was of a family of local luminaries in the Town of Bushwick, and is remembered today by Meserole Street in Williamsburg and Meserole Avenue in Greenpoint, both relatively minor routes on a citywide scale, but fairly important industrial and residential streets locally. The Kent Avenue portion of the route required trackage rights from the Brooklyn City Railroad, which was grudgingly given, but a snag appeared when the residents on North 4 Street denied permission for the new line. The City averted disaster by amending the franchise on December 16, 1867, substituting Grand Street between Kent and Driggs Avenues, along the route of the Grand Street and Newtown Railroad, again requiring a Trackage Rights contract.

== Operation ==
Operation of the railroad started shortly thereafter, so the franchise became secure. In the meantime, Prospect Park became a focal point for the fledgling streetcar lines of Brooklyn City, as did the Village of Hunterspoint just across Newtown Creek in Queens County, and conflict erupted between this railroad and the Nassau Railroad over identical wording of the Nassau road's franchise and this road's franchise. Settlement resulted in the consolidation of this road and the Nassau Railroad as the Brooklyn City, Hunterspoint and Prospect Park Railroad on June 30, 1868.
