= 8WM/Novakane =

Studio album by Black Sheep
- Released: October 24, 2006
- Recorded: 2005–2006
- Genre: Hip-hop
- Label: Bumrush Records
- Producers: Vitamin D BeanOne; Showbiz

Black Sheep chronology
Redlight, Greenlight (EP) (2002)	8WM/Novakane (2006)

Professional ratings
Review scores
Source	Rating
AllHipHop	link
Okayplayer	link

8WM/Novakane is the third studio album by hip-hop duo Black Sheep, the group's first full-length album since 1994's Non-Fiction. It was released as a download-only album in October 2006, and a physical release followed in December 2007. Group member Mista Lawnge, while still briefly featured on the album, split from the group before the release, leaving Dres as Black Sheep's sole member. 8WM/Novakane features production from Vitamin D, BeanOne and long-time collaborator Showbiz. The album's lead single, "Whodat?" features a music video, which was released in October 2006.

== Track listing ==
1. "U Mean I Don't"
2. "Grew Up"
3. "Be Careful"
4. "Hey"
5. "Whodat?"
6. "Sunshine"
7. "Shorty"
8. "8WM"
9. "Novakane"
10. "Everyday"
11. "Heed the Word"
12. "Wonder" (feat. Yummy Bingham)
13. "B-Boy's Theme"
14. "Novakane Groove"
