= Nassau Railroad =

Nassau Railroad Company was a streetcar company that ran in Queens and Kings Counties in the State of New York during the 1850s and 1860s.

== History ==
The NRR was chartered by the New York State Legislature under The General Railroad Law of 1850 (GRL-50) on March 3, 1865 just 37 days prior to the end of the Civil War. It was a rich railroad for those days - as street railroads went - for it had a capitalization of $600,000, and an unlimited corporate life. The railroad immediately petitioned for a franchise from the City of Brooklyn, but it was denied on the grounds that the Greenpoint and Williamsburgh Railroad already had one for part of the route system the railroad was trying to get. The railroad next lobbied in Albany, and the Legislature issued the following franchise as a result, under Chapter 823, laws of 1866:

CROSSTOWN: From Hunterspoint Ferry at the foot of West 2nd Street (54th Avenue) via the Williamsburgh, Ravenswood, and Astoria Turnpike, (Vernon Boulevard and Manhattan Avenue); Driggs Avenue (double track), Driggs Avenue/Bedford Avenue (single track each), Broadway, Rush Street, Kent Avenue, Washington Avenue, Park & Flushing Avenues (single track on each), Willoughby Street, Joralemon St, Court Street and Atlantic Avenue to South Ferry. (Note: North end of today's B-61 Crosstown bus route)

FRANKLIN AVENUE: From Crosstown via Washington Avenue, Montgomery Street, and Franklin to Flatbush Avenue. (Note: Southern portion of today's B-48 Franklin Avenue bus line)

The new railroad could never establish whether it actually intended to operate, or whether it was a stalking horse for the Greenpoint and Williamsburgh Railroad. The two railroads promptly solved the route problem, but not before the City of Brooklyn tried to throw a monkey wrench into the whole deal. The Nassau RR could not obtain consents for the Washington Avenue portion between Myrtle and Atlantic Avenues, and - of course - the emphasis shifted from Flatbush Village as a source of revenue to Grand Army Plaza, which was to be the most public portion of Prospect Park, which was then under construction.

The legislature solved the problem by amending the earlier franchise by issuing Chapter 286, Laws of 1868, which awarded the following route:

VANDERBILT AVENUE: From Washington & Park Avenues via Washington Avenue, Myrtle Avenue, and Vanderbilt Avenue to Grand Army Plaza. This established the Nassau Railroad as the first railroad on Vanderbilt Avenue, although other railroads would gain much more fame for the route than the Nassau Railroad. (Note: The middle portion of today's B69 (New York City bus) Vanderbilt Avenue Bus Line)

== Resolution ==
The two railroads finally admitted that they had lobbied in Albany for permission to consolidate, and the legislature consented by passing Chapter 576, Laws of 1868, which authorized the consolidation. The consolidation was consummated on July 31, 1868, and the Brooklyn City, Hunterspoint and Prospect Park Railroad was born.
