= Marvin and Tamara =

British singing duo

- Origin: United Kingdom
- Genres: Pop
- Years active: 1999–2000
- Label: Epic
- Past members: Marvin Simmonds; Tamara Nicole Bentham

Marvin and Tamara were an English pop music duo from the United Kingdom. Their first single, "Groove Machine", peaked at No. 11 in the UK Singles Chart in August 1999. After their follow-up single, "North, South, East, West", only reached No. 38, they were subsequently dropped by their record label, Epic.

Marvin and Tamara were known for supporting Steps on their 'The Next Step Live' tour.

== Single discography ==
First released	Title	UK Singles Chart
12 July 1999	"Groove Machine"	#11
13 December 1999	"North, South, East, West"	#38
