= Astoria Houses =

Public housing development in Queens, New York

- NYCHA Property
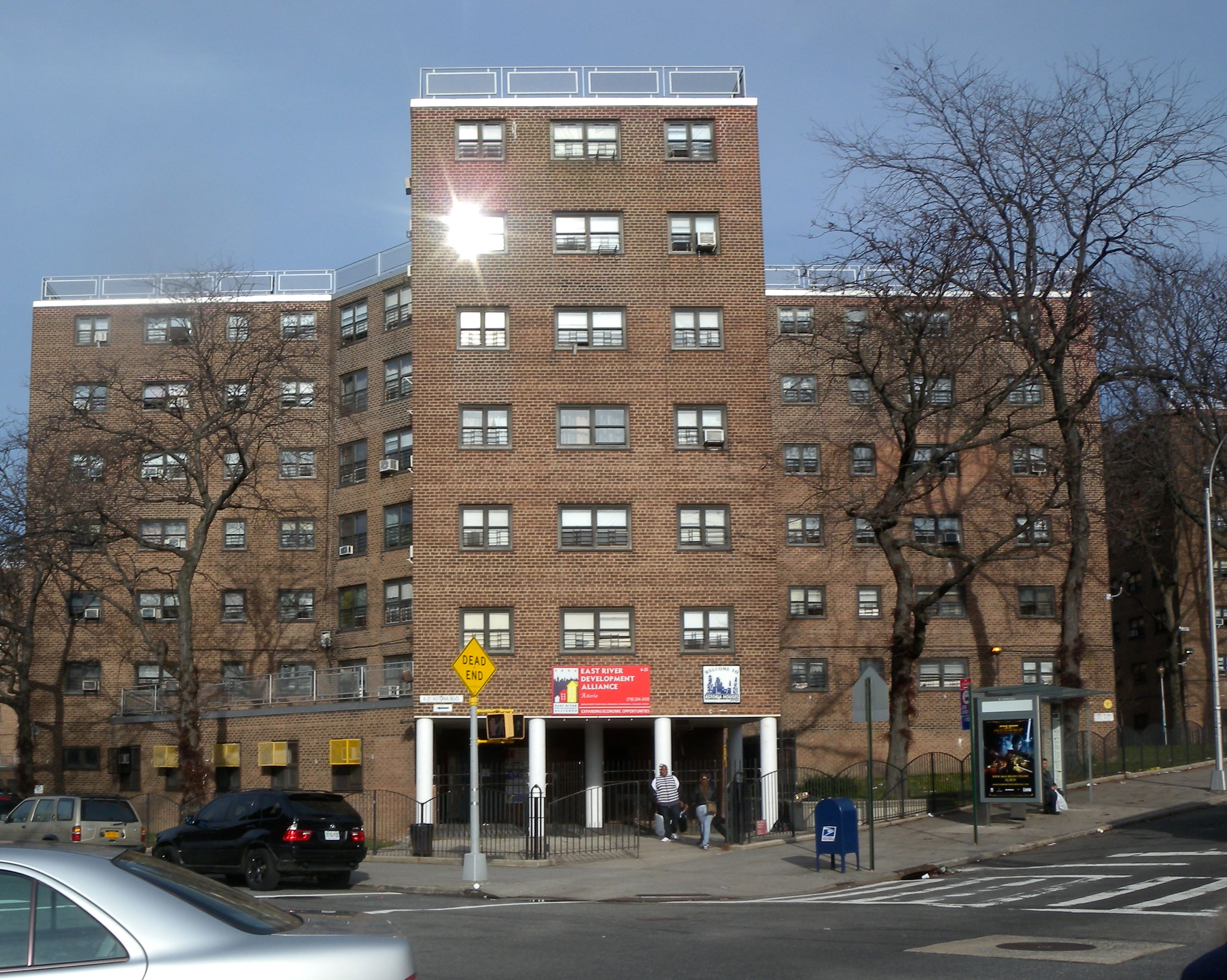
- Interactive map of Astoria Houses
- Country: United States
- State: New York
- City: New York City
- Borough: Queens

Area
  - Total: 26.86 acres (10.87 ha)

Population
  - Total: 2,601
- Zip Code: 11102

The Astoria Houses is a NYCHA housing complex that has 22 buildings, six to seven stories tall, located between 27th Avenue and the East River and also between Hallet's Cove to 8th Street in Astoria, Queens. It has over 2,600 residents.

== History ==
This housing complex was completed in November 1951.

=== 21st Century ===
FEMA provided $88 million in funding for the buildings directly in front of the East River and Hallet's Cove to include backup power generators on their rooftops, new doors, and door frames for extra safety inside buildings; this work started in 2016 while the rest are unfunded.

Its community center project was designed by 22 middle-schoolers from this complex, working with the Salvadori Center. These renovations were completed in October 2024 and are part of the Public Housing Community Fund (PHCF).

== See also ==
- New York City Housing Authority
