= Strobelite Honey =

Single by Black Sheep

from the album A Wolf in Sheep's Clothing
- Released: December 1991
- Recorded: 1991
- Genre: East Coast hip hop, disco

"Strobelite Honey" is a 1991 single by hip-hop duo Black Sheep. The single was written by William McLean and Dres (rapper) and was the duo's third release from their A Wolf in Sheep's Clothing album. "Strobelite Honey" was the duo's second entry on the US R&B chart, where it went peaked at #36 on the R&B sales chart and #80 on the Hot 100.

The single did better on the US dance chart, where the remix by David Morales spent one week at number one.

The song sampled two records released in 1980: "I Like What You Do To Me" by Young & Company and "Take Your Time (Do it Right)" by the SOS Band.

== See also ==
- List of number-one dance singles of 1992 (U.S.)

This single also sampled "The Glow of Love" by Change
