= Native Tongues =

American hip hop collective

- Origin: New York City, U.S.
- Genres: Progressive rap; conscious rap; alternative hip-hop; psychedelic rap
- Years active: 1988–late 1990s
- Past members: Jungle Brothers; De La Soul; A Tribe Called Quest; Monie Love; Queen Latifah; Black Sheep; Chi-Ali

The Native Tongues was a collective of late 1980s and early 1990s hip-hop artists known for their positive-minded, good-natured Afrocentric lyrics, and for pioneering the use of eclectic sampling and jazz-influenced beats. Its principal members were the Jungle Brothers, De La Soul, A Tribe Called Quest, Black Sheep, Monie Love, Queen Latifah, and Chi-Ali. The collective was also closely tied to the Universal Zulu Nation.

The Native Tongues movement inspired later alternative hip-hop artists such as Kanye West, Outkast, the Roots, Lupe Fiasco, Little Brother, Black Eyed Peas, Jurassic 5, Dead Prez, Camp Lo, Jean Grae, Nappy Roots, Digable Planets, Common, Black Star, J Dilla, Lauryn Hill, MF Doom and Pharrell Williams. Rolling Stone cites the track "Doin' Our Own Dang" as "the definitive Native Tongues posse cut".

== Naming ==
The Native Tongues took their name from a line in the song "African Cry", by Motown-offshoot funk group New Birth, which features the lyric, "took away our native tongues".

== History ==
The New York City-based Native Tongues crew was a collective of like-minded hip-hop artists. They drew influences from artists such as Gil Scott-Heron, the Last Poets and Grandmaster Flash.

De La Soul's Trugoy the Dove recalled: "The Native Tongues came about where, basically, we had a show together in Boston. [De La Soul], Jungle [Brothers] and we linked from there. We had a natural love for the art and a natural love for each other on how we put stuff together. So we invited [the Jungle Brothers] to a session, and when they hooked up with us, we happened to be doing "Buddy." It wasn't business; it wasn't for a check. It was just trading ideas and just seeing what you're doing. Bottom line, it was just having fun."

According to Q-Tip of A Tribe Called Quest: "I remember Afrika [Baby Bam] called me that night, like, two in the morning. "Yo these kids, De La Soul, you gotta meet ’em! I swear we're just alike!" I went there, met them, and it was just fuckin' love at first sight. It was disgusting. In hip hop, it praises individualism. I think that's the main achievement of the Native Tongues. It just showed people could come together."

Fostered by Kool DJ Red Alert, the success of the Jungle Brothers would pave the way for De La Soul and A Tribe Called Quest; together, these three groups would form the core of the crew and continue the spirit of Afrika Bambaataa and the Zulu Nation. By 1989 they had been joined by Queen Latifah and the United Kingdom's Monie Love, and soon by the Black Sheep and Chi-Ali.

If you’re old enough, recall the naive early-'90s moment when young rappers from Nassau County and so forth were so brave they considered mellow and humorous a righteous path as well as a commercial ploy.

— Robert Christgau, 2019

While featuring an extensive discography, the collaborations of the Native Tongues have been fairly limited: the collective never recorded anything under that name, and the number of notable crew cuts can be counted on one hand. The various groups grew distant with time, and, by 1993, De La Soul's Trugoy the Dove proclaimed, "That native shit is dead."

A 2020 Vulture article defined the official crew members as: Jungle Brothers, De La Soul, A Tribe Called Quest, Monie Love, Queen Latifah, Black Sheep, Chi-Ali. Honorary members were listed as: The Beatnuts, Brand Nubian, Shortie No Mass, J Dilla, Leaders of the New School, Mos Def, Truth Enola, DJ S.T.R.E.S.S., Da Bush Babees, Common, the Pharcyde, Vinia Mojica.

== Legacy ==
The Native Tongues movement inspired later alt rap artists such as Kanye West, Outkast, the Roots, Lupe Fiasco, Little Brother, Black Eyed Peas, Dead Prez, Camp Lo, Jean Grae, Nappy Roots, Digable Planets, Common, Black Star, J Dilla, Lauryn Hill, MF Doom and Pharrell Williams.

In 2019, the 9:30 Club in Washington, D.C., launched an annual Native Tongues Festival to celebrate the musical legacy of the Native Tongues.

== Members ==
- De La Soul (Posdnuos, Trugoy, Maseo)
- A Tribe Called Quest (Q-Tip, Phife Dawg, Ali Shaheed Muhammad and Jarobi White)
- Jungle Brothers (Mike Gee, Afrika Baby Bam, and Sammy B)
- Monie Love
- Queen Latifah
- Black Sheep (Mista Lawnge and Dres)
- Chi-Ali
