= Black Sheep (group) =

American hip-hop group

- Dres (left) & Mista Lawnge (right)

Background information
- Origin: New York City, U.S.
- Genre: Progressive rap
- Years active: 1989–1995; 2000–2002; 2006–present
- Labels: Mercury; PolyGram
- Members: Dres; Mista Lawnge

Black Sheep is an American hip-hop duo from Queens, New York, United States, composed of Andres "Dres" Vargas Titus and William "Mista Lawnge" McLean. The duo was from New York but met as teenagers in Sanford, North Carolina, where both of their families relocated. The group was part of the Native Tongues collective, which included the Jungle Brothers, De La Soul, and A Tribe Called Quest. After getting together in 1989, Black Sheep debuted in 1991 with the hit song "Flavor of the Month" and later released its first album, A Wolf in Sheep's Clothing, which gained them praise and recognition in the hip-hop community for the album's unique rhythms and intelligent, often humorous lyrics. After six years together, Black Sheep disbanded in 1995, citing creative differences.

== Biography ==
=== Initial career and break up (1989–1995) ===
Black Sheep was formed in 1989 by William "Mista Lawnge" McLean. While working as a DJ in New York, McLean met Mike Gee of the Jungle Brothers and DJ Red Alert, who encouraged him to start his own hip-hop group. He recruited Dres, who he had grown up with in North Carolina. Black Sheep was the first hip-hop act to appear on The Tonight Show with Jay Leno after the departure of Johnny Carson. Their first official appearance as Black Sheep was on De La Soul's 1991 album De La Soul Is Dead. Dres was featured on the track "Fanatic of the B Word".

A Wolf in Sheep's Clothing charted three times on the Billboard Hot Dance Music/Club Play chart in 1992 with "The Choice Is Yours (Revisited)" (No. 9), and "Strobelite Honey" (No. 1). Black Sheep was also featured on the remix of Vanessa Williams's single "Work to Do" (No. 8). The group's relationship with its label, Mercury/PolyGram, allowed Dres to establish a boutique label through which he could sign his own acts. Mercury distributed the imprint, which was called One Love, through PolyGram's Independent Label Sales division rather than PolyGram Group Distribution. However, only one full-length title was ever released, the only album by affiliated act the Legion, titled Theme + Echo = Krill from 1994.

The group's second album, Non-Fiction, was released later that year. Because of virtually no promotion and a generally poor reception, the album managed only lackluster sales. Black Sheep broke up shortly after its release.

=== Aftermath ===
Dres was featured on the second Handsome Boy Modeling School album White People, on the track "First...and Then." In 2006, Dres released an online-only album titled 8WM/Novakane, under the name Black Sheep, but Lawnge was not a part of the album. 8WM stands for Women with Women with Weed with Wine with Me. According to a 2006 article on AllHipHop.com, Mista Lawnge added another spelling of his name to Mr Long. He also released a mixtape called The Class of 89 in 2006. Dres appeared on the 1990s remix of Nas' February 2007 song "Where are They Now?"

In 2008, the single "The Choice is Yours (Revisited)" was ranked number No. 74 on VH1's 100 Greatest Hip Hop Songs. The song was featured in a commercial for the 2010 Kia Soul.

== Discography ==
=== Studio albums ===
List of studio albums, with selected chart positions and certifications
| Title | Album details | Peak chart positions | | Certifications |
| Title | Album details | US | US R&B /HH | Certifications |
|---|---|---|---|---|
| A Wolf in Sheep's Clothing | Released: October 22, 1991; Label: Mercury; Formats: CD, LP, cassette, digital download, streaming | 30 | 15 | RIAA: Gold |
| Non-Fiction | Released: December 6, 1994; Label: Mercury/PolyGram; Formats: CD, LP, cassette, digital download, streaming | 107 | 14 | |
| 8WM/Novakane | Released: October 24, 2006; Label: Bumrush; Formats: CD, digital download, streaming | — | — | |
| From the Black Pool of Genius | Released: June 29, 2010; Label: Bumrush; Formats: CD, digital download, streaming | — | — | |
| Tortured Soul | Released: August 17, 2018; Label: X-Ray; Formats: CD, digital download, streaming | — | — | |
"—" denotes a recording that did not chart or was not released in that territory.

=== As lead artist ===
List of singles, with selected chart positions
| Title | Year | Peak chart positions | | | | | Album |
| Title | Year | US | US Dance | US R&B | US Rap | UK | Album |
|---|---|---|---|---|---|---|---|
| "Try Counting Sheep" | 1991 | — | — | — | — | — | A Wolf in Sheep's Clothing |
| "Flavor of the Month" | 1991 | — | — (Note: "I Shouldn't Have Done It" did not enter the Dance Club Songs, but peaked at number 34 on the Dance/Electronic Singles Sales.) | — | 2 | — | A Wolf in Sheep's Clothing |
| "The Choice Is Yours (Revisited)" | 1991 | 57 | 6 | 21 | 1 | — | Stay Tuned (soundtrack) / A Wolf in Sheep's Clothing |
| "Strobelite Honey" | 1991 | 80 | 1 | 36 | 5 | — | Stay Tuned (soundtrack) / A Wolf in Sheep's Clothing |
| "Similak Child" | 1992 | — | — (Note: "I Shouldn't Have Done It" did not enter the Dance Club Songs, but peaked at number 34 on the Dance/Electronic Singles Sales.) | — | — | — | A Wolf in Sheep's Clothing |
| "Without a Doubt" | 1994 | 90 | 87 | — (Note: "Behind Bars" did not enter the Dance Club Songs, but peaked at number 8 on the Dance/Electronic Singles Sales.) | 63 | 60 | Non-Fiction |
| "North, South, East, West" | 1995 | — | — (Note: "Sittin' in My Car" did not enter the Billboard Hot 100, but peaked at number 1 on the Bubbling Under Hot 100.) | — (Note: "Sittin' in My Car" did not enter the Dance Club Songs, but peaked at number 18 on the Dance/Electronic Singles Sales.) | 56 | — | Non-Fiction |
| "We Turn It" (featuring Doug E. Fresh) | — | — | — | — | — | | |
| "Why, Why, Why" (Note: "Why, Why, Why" was released as a split single with "You Don't Know" by Black Rob and "Stay Schemin" & "Put To Death" by Nas.) | — | — | — | — | — | | |
| "Can't Shake Us" (featuring Special K) | 2002 | — | — | — | — | — | Non-album single |
| "Snakes of the World Today" | 2018 | — | — | — | — | — | The Great Adventures of Slick Rick (Deluxe Edition) |
| "Hey Young World (Demo)" | 2019 | — | — | — | — | — | The Great Adventures of Slick Rick (Deluxe Edition) |
| "Midas Touch" | 2019 | — | — | — | — | — | Non-album single |
| "Can't Dance To a Track That Ain't Got No Soul" | 2019 | — | — | — | — | — | Non-album single |
"—" denotes a recording that did not chart or was not released in that territory.

=== Albums ===
Album information
A Wolf in Sheep's Clothing
- Released: October 22, 1991
- RIAA Certification: Gold
- Billboard 200 chart position: No. 30
- R&B/Hip-Hop chart position: No. 15
- Singles: "Flavor of the Month"/"Butt...In the Meantime", "The Choice Is Yours (Revisited)"/"The Choice Is Yours"/"Have U.N.E. Pull"/"Yes", "Strobelite Honey"/"Gimme the Finga", "Similak Child"
Non-Fiction
- Released: December 6, 1994
- Billboard 200 chart position: No. 107
- R&B/Hip-Hop chart position: No. 24
- Singles: "Without a Doubt"/"We Boys", "North South East West"
8WM/Novakane
- Released: October 23, 2006
From the Black Pool of Genius
- Released: June 29, 2010
Tortured Soul
- Released: August 10, 2018

=== Singles and EPs ===
- "Flavor of the Month" (1991)
- "Flash's theme (remix)" on Flash Gordon reissue (Sept 1991)
- "The Choice Is Yours (Revisited)" (Oct 1991)
  - covered by several artists including Trik Turner, Bloodhound Gang, and the Deftones
  - (Used in the 2010 Kia Soul "Rapping Hamsters" commercial)
- "Strobelite Honey" (1992)
- "Similak Child" (1992)
- "Without a Doubt" (1994)
- "North South East West" (1995)
- Redlight, Greenlight (EP) (recorded 2000, released 2002)

=== Music videos ===
- "Flavor of the Month" (1991)
- "The Choice Is Yours" (1991)
- "Strobelite Honey" (1992)
- Vanessa Williams ft. Black Sheep - "Work to Do" (Remix) [1992]
- Showbiz & A.G ft. Black Sheep - "Bounce Ta This" (1992)
- "Similak Child" (1992)
- Flavor Unit ft. Dres - "Rollin' wit da Flava" (1993)
- The Legion ft. Dres - "Jingle Jangle" (1993)
- "Without a Doubt" (1994)
