= Charles Stone III =

American film director

- Born: 1966 (age 59–60); Philadelphia, Pennsylvania, U.S.
- Occupation: Film director
- Years active: 1998–present

Charles Stone III (born 1966) is an American film director. He is best known for Drumline starring Nick Cannon, Mr. 3000 starring Bernie Mac, and Paid in Full.

Stone directed the video to "What They Do" by The Roots, featuring the group running through many rap video clichés.

Stone is the creator of the popular advertising campaign "Whassup?" for Budweiser in 1999. In October 2008, he directed a spoof of this campaign to depict his critical view of the Republican Party's eight years in the White House and to support the presidential campaign of Barack Obama.

A 1984 graduate of Central High School in Philadelphia, he is the son of Louise Davis Stone and journalist and Tuskegee Airman Chuck Stone.

== Filmography ==
=== Film ===
- Drumline (2002)
- Paid in Full (2002)
- Mr. 3000 (2004)
- CrazySexyCool: The TLC Story (2013)
- Lila & Eve (2015)
- Step Sisters (2017)
- Uncle Drew (2018)
- The Underdoggs (2024)

=== Television ===
- Friday Night Lights (2007)
- Lincoln Heights (2007–09)
- Spaced (2008) (TV movie)
- CrazySexyCool: The TLC Story (2013) (TV movie)
- Greenleaf (2016)
- Black-ish (2018–19)
- Black Monday (2019)
- Bigger (2019)
- Mixed-ish (2019)
- Zoey's Extraordinary Playlist (2020)
- Superstore (2021)
- Kenan (2021)
- Naomi (2022)

== Music videos ==
- Living Colour – "Funny Vibe"
- Living Colour – "Elvis Is Dead"
- Colin James – "Just Came Back"
- A Tribe Called Quest – "I Left My Wallet in El Segundo"
- A Tribe Called Quest – "Bonita Applebum"
- Intelligent Hoodlum – "Arrest the President"
- Public Enemy – "911 Is a Joke"
- Black Sheep – "The Choice Is Yours (Revisited)"
- Harmony – "Poundcake"
- Fu-Schnickens – "La Schmoove"
- Fu-Schnickens – "True Fu-Schnick"
- After 7 – "Can He Love U Like This"
- Neneh Cherry featuring Guru – "Sassy"
- The Roots – "Distortion to Static"
- Eric Benét – "Let's Stay Together"
- Screaming Headless Torsos – "Vinnie"
- Vernon Reid – "Mistaken Identity"
- The Roots – "Concerto of the Desparado"
- The Roots – "What They Do"
- Large Professor – "Ijustwannachill"
- Artifacts – "The Ultimate"
- Stephen Simmonds – "Get Down"
- Ultra Naté – "Found a Cure"
- P.M. Dawn featuring John Forté & Ky-Mani Marley – "Gotta Be...Movin On Up"
- P.M. Dawn – "I Had No Right"
- The Roots featuring Erykah Badu – "You Got Me"
- The Roots – "The Next Movement"
- Shootyz Groove – "L Train"
- Quad City DJ's – "Let's Do It"
