= Shaheedullah and Stereotypes =

Studio album by Ali Shaheed Muhammad
- Released: October 12, 2004
- Recorded: 1999–2004
- Genre: Alternative hip hop; R&B
- Length: 63:37
- Label: Ryko
- Producer: Ali Shaheed Muhammad

Ali Shaheed Muhammad chronology
Lucy Pearl (2000)	Shaheedullah and Stereotypes (2004)	Luke Cage (2016)

Shaheedullah and Stereotypes is the debut solo studio album by Ali Shaheed Muhammad better known as a member of A Tribe Called Quest. It features the single "Banga". The album is now out of print and is currently the only solo studio album released by the rapper.

== Reception ==
Professional ratings
Review scores
Source	Rating
AllMusic	2.5/5 stars

Del F. Cowie of Exclaim! said Muhammad had made "a confident step into solo territory" with Shaheedullah and Stereotypes. On the other hand, John Bush of AllMusic called the album "a troublesome record" while Dave Heaton of PopMatters said the album overall was "too run-of-the-mill".

== Track listing ==
1. Social Reform – 1:40
2. Lord Can I Have This Mercy – (featuring Chip-Fu) – 3:11
3. Industry/Life – 3:05
4. Tight – (featuring Kay Jay) – 4:39
5. All Right (Aight)/Interlude – 4:04
6. Put Me On – (featuring Stokley Williams) – 5:13
7. Honey Child (featuring Sy Smith) – 3:30
8. Family – (featuring Kay Jay & Sy Smith) – 4:20
9. (They Can't) Define Our Love – (featuring Sy Smith) – 3:55
10. Banga – (featuring Stokley Williams) – 4:20
11. Part of the Night – (featuring Sy Smith) – 4:23
12. From DJs 2 Musicians To... – 2:22
13. U Suckers – 3:05
14. Matches – Don't Play!!! – 3:58
15. All Night – (featuring Wallace Gary) – 2:53
16. I Declare – 4:18
17. Elevated Orange – 4:48

== Charts ==
Chart (2004)	Peak position
US Top R&B/Hip-Hop Albums (Billboard)	99
