= Forever (Phife Dawg album) =

Studio album by Phife Dawg
- Released: March 22, 2022
- Genre: Hip-hop
- Length: 53:05
- Labels: Smokin' Needles; AWAL
- Producers: Malik Taylor (exec.); Dion "DJ Rasta Root" Liverpool (exec.); 9th Wonder; Angela Winbush; Bobby Ozuna; G Koop; J Dilla; Khrysis; Luke Austin; Nottz; Potatohead People; Riddim Kidz; The Roux; V.Rich

Phife Dawg chronology
Ventilation: Da LP (2000)	Forever (2022)

Singles from Forever
- 1. "Nutshell Pt. 2" Released: February 11, 2021; 2. "French Kiss Trois" Released: September 2, 2021; 3. "Forever" Released: March 19, 2022

Forever is the posthumous second and final studio album by American rapper Phife Dawg. It was released on March 22, 2022, the sixth anniversary of his death, by Smokin' Needles Records and AWAL. It features guest appearances by his bandmate Q-Tip, Busta Rhymes, Maseo and Posdnuos of De La Soul, Dwele, Angela Winbush, Redman, Illa J, and Little Brother, among others. The album was mostly complete at the time of Phife Dawg's death, and was later completed by his business partner and collaborator, DJ Rasta Root.

Professional ratings
Aggregate scores
Source	Rating
Metacritic	77/100
Review scores
Source	Rating
AllMusic	4/5 stars
The A.V. Club	B−
Clash	7/10
Exclaim!	7/10
HipHopDX	3.9/5
Pitchfork	7.0/10
Rolling Stone	4/5 stars
Tom Hull – on the Web	B+

Forever was met with generally positive reviews. At Metacritic, which assigns a normalized rating out of 100 to reviews from professional publications, the album received an average score of 77, based on seven reviews.

== Background ==
Before his death on March 22, 2016, Phife Dawg had spent roughly a decade recording tracks for his second album, originally titled Songs in the Key of Phife: Volume 1 (Cheryl's Big Son). According to DJ Rasta Root, two-thirds of the album was recorded before he stepped in to complete it. For the final third of the album, he used "a lot of blueprints and clues" that Phife Dawg had left behind, in the form of rap notebooks that detailed producers, featured guests, and liner notes that he wanted for the album. DJ Rasta Root noted, "Down to the mix engineer [Bob Power], the photographers, everybody involved had some connection with Phife." His bandmate Ali Shaheed Muhammad mixed two tracks, "Nutshell Pt. 2" and "French Kiss Trois".

== Promotion ==
Forever was promoted with three singles, "Nutshell Pt. 2", "French Kiss Trois", and the title track "Forever". Music videos were released for "Nutshell Pt. 2" on March 22, 2021, "French Kiss Trois" on September 3, 2021, and "Forever" on March 31, 2022.

== Track listing ==
Credits are adapted from Tidal.

Forever track listing
No.	Title	Writer(s)	Producer(s)	Length
1.	"Cheryl's Big Son (Intro)" (featuring V.Rich)	Dion Liverpool; Vincent Richardson	DJ Rasta Root; V.Rich	0:43
2.	"Only a Coward"	Malik Taylor; Patrick Douthit	9th Wonder	4:02
3.	"Fallback" (featuring Rapsody and Renée Neufville)	Taylor; Christopher Tyson; Marlanna Evans; Renée Neufville	Khrysis	4:15
4.	"Nutshell Pt. 2" (featuring Busta Rhymes and Redman)	Taylor; Liverpool; James Yancey; Trevor Smith Jr.; Reginald Noble	J Dilla	3:41
5.	"Sorry" (featuring V.Rich)	Taylor; Liverpool; Dominick Lamb; Richardson; Jon Bonus	Nottz	4:05
6.	"Dear Dilla (Reprise)" (featuring Q-Tip)	Taylor; Liverpool; Kamaal Fareed; Richardson; Demontrious Lawrence	DJ Rasta Root	3:51
7.	"Wow Factor" (featuring Maseo)	Taylor; Tyson; Vincent Mason Jr.	Khrysis	2:43
8.	"Residual Curiosities" (featuring Lyric Jones)	Taylor; Liverpool; Janelle Clinton; Marcus Daniels	Riddim Kidz	4:20
9.	"God Send" (featuring Dwele)	Taylor; Andwele Gardner; Bobby Ozuna; Robert Mandell	Ozuna; G Koop	4:52
10.	"Round Irving High School" (featuring Cheryl Boyce-Taylor and Angela Winbush)	Cheryl Boyce-Taylor; Angela Winbush; Richardson	Winbush	5:07
11.	"French Kiss Trois" (featuring Redman and Illa J)	Taylor; John Yancey; Nate Drobner; Nick Wisdom	Potatohead People	3:58
12.	"2 Live Forever" (featuring Posdnuos, Little Brother and Darien Brockington)	Taylor; Kelvin Mercer; Phonte Coleman; Thomas Jones III; Jermaine Williams; Kevin Jackson; Luke Austin; Ronnie Mason Jr.	The Roux; Luke Austin	5:24
13.	"Forever"	Taylor; Liverpool; Lamb; Richardson	Nottz; DJ Rasta Root; V.Rich	5:57
Total length:				53:05

Sample credits

- "2 Live Forever" contains a sample of "On Love", performed by David T. Walker.
- "Forever" contains samples of "Triumph", performed by Wu-Tang Clan and "Ms. Jackson", performed by Outkast.
