= Sarah Pirozek =

Sarah Pirozek is a British director, writer and producer. She has directed television commercials, shorts, features and a documentary feature with the Beastie Boys, which she co-produced, and has also developed a TV series. Her feature, #LIKE is a Noir Thriller starring Marc Menchaca.

In 1998 she directed her first major documentary, titled Free Tibet, which documents the Tibetan Freedom Concert held in order to raise awareness for the hostile conditions that Tibetan citizens endure due to China's reign over the country.

== Biography ==
Pirozek studied filmmaking at Saint Martin's School of Art in London before moving to New York City to attend the independent study program at the Whitney Museum of American Art.

== Filmography ==
Year	Title	Credits	Notes
2021	# LIKE	Director/Producer	Feature film
2014	The A-Z of Being a Whore	Director/Producer	Short film
2012	To Kill a Mockingbird Versus Animal Farm Prep School Rap Battle	Director	Short
2007	What You Missed	Director/Producer	Series
2006	Crafty	Director/Producer	TV movie
2003	World's Apart	Director/Producer	TV Documentary Series
2001	MTV Fake ID Club	Director	TV series
2001	EGG, the Arts Show	Director/Producer, 2 episodes	TV series
2000	Sonic Cinema	Director/Producer, Series	TV series
2000	Sade	Director	TV movie
1998	Free Tibet	Director	Documentary

== Music videos ==
- J C Lodge - Home Is Where The Hurt Is (1991)
- The Family Stand - "New World Order" (1991)
- The Family Stand - "Shades Of Blue" (1992)
- Queen Latifah - "How Do I Love Thee" (1992)
- Fu-Schnickens featuring Shaquille O'Neal - "What's Up Doc? (Can We Rock)" (1993)
- Erule - "Listen Up" (1994)
- UMC's - "Time To Set It Straight" (1994)
- Gumbo - "A Free Soul" (1994)
- Olu - "Baby Can't Leave It Alone" (1999)
- Olu - "My World" (1999)
