= Nervous Breakdown (album) =

Studio album by Fu-Schnickens
- Released: October 25, 1994
- Recorded: 1993–1994
- Genre: East Coast hip hop; alternative hip hop
- Length: 40:46
- Label: Jive
- Producer: Diamond D; Jim Nice; K-Cut; Lyvio G.; Rod 'KP' Kirkpatrick

Fu-Schnickens chronology
F.U. Don't Take It Personal (1992)	Nervous Breakdown (1994)

Singles from Nervous Breakdown
- 1. "What's Up Doc? (Can We Rock)" Released: June 8, 1993; 2. "Breakdown" Released: October 25, 1994; 3. "Sum Dum Munkey" Released: February 20, 1995

Nervous Breakdown is the second and final studio album by American hip hop group Fu-Schnickens. It was released October 25, 1994, via Jive Records. The album was produced by Rod 'KP' Kirkpatrick, Diamond D, K-Cut, Jim Nice, and Lyvio G. It peaked at number eighty-one on the Billboard 200 chart.

== Release and reception ==
Professional ratings
Review scores
Source	Rating
AllMusic	4/5 stars
RapReviews	5.5/10
The Village Voice	A−

Nervous Breakdown peaked at eighty-one on the U.S. Billboard 200 and reached the nineteenth spot on the Top R&B/Hip-Hop Albums chart. In a contemporary review for The Village Voice, Robert Christgau wrote:

You want an inkling of how grim things are for black kids right now, try and find another current rap record that manages to mean a damn thing without slipping into gangsta suicide or Afrocentric cryptoracism. Since this one sank faster than Public Enemy, maybe it doesn't mean much either, but to me the East Flatbush trio radiates the hope hip hop was full of not so long ago. There's deep pleasure in their vocal tradeoffs and hard, wryly textured tracks. There's wordwise grace in rhymes that balance B-movie fantasy against everyday brutality without denial or despair. And there's joy in the nonpareil skills of reformed backward rapper Chip Fu. He coughs, he hiccups, he snorts, he stutters; he whinnies, wheezes, wows, and flutters.

Bret Love at AllMusic wrote in retrospect that Nervous Breakdown showcased "an improved lyrical maturity among all three members" on a record that was "a frenzied, fast-paced roller coaster ride of originality that doesn't let up until the last song ends."

== Track listing ==
No.	Title	Writer(s)	Producer(s)	Length
1.	"Breakdown"	Roderick Roachford; Lennox Maturine; Rod Kirkpatrick; Larry Troutman; Roger Troutman	Rod 'KP' Kirkpatrick	4:10
2.	"Sum Dum Munkey"	Roachford; Maturine; Joseph A. Jones; Kevin McKenzie	K-Cut; Fu-Schnickens (co.)	3:48
3.	"Visions (20/20)"	Roachford; Maturine; Kirkpatrick	Rod 'KP' Kirkpatrick	5:14
4.	"Watch Ya Back Door"	Roachford; Maturine; J. Fields	Jim Nice	2:53
5.	"Aaahh Ooohhh!"	Roachford; Maturine; Jones; Joseph Kirkland	Diamond D	3:06
6.	"Sneakin' Up on Ya"	Roachford; Maturine; Kirkland	Diamond D	3:37
7.	"Got It Covered"	Roachford; Maturine; Kirkpatrick	Rod 'KP' Kirkpatrick	4:10
8.	"Who Stole the Pebble"	Roachford; Maturine; Lyvio R. Gay	Lyvio G.	3:33
9.	"Hi Lo"	Roachford; Maturine; Kirkpatrick	Rod 'KP' Kirkpatrick	4:46
10.	"What's Up Doc? (Can We Rock) (K Cut's Fat Trac Remix)" (featuring Shaquille O'Neal)	Roachford; Maturine; Jones; Shaquille O'Neal; McKenzie	K-Cut	3:56
11.	"Breakdown (Dunkafelic Remix)"	Roachford; Maturine; Kirkpatrick	Rod 'KP' Kirkpatrick	4:26
Total length:				40:46

Sample credits

- Track 1 contains a sample of "Dance Floor" written by Roger Troutman and Larry Troutman and performed by Roger Troutman.
- Track 2 contains a sample of "The Show" written by Richard Walters and D. Smith and performed by Slick Rick.
- Track 3 contains a sample of "Crooklyn" written by Jonathan Davis, Ali Shaheed Muhammad, Kenyatta Blake, Duval Clear and Edward Archer and performed by The Crooklyn Dodgers.
- Track 7 contains a sample of "Hittin' Switches" written and performed by Erick Sermon.
- Track 11 contains a sample of "(Not Just) Knee Deep" written by George Clinton Jr. and Philippé Wynne and performed by Funkadelic, and "360 Degrees" written and performed by Maxwell "Grand Puba" Dixon.

== Personnel ==
- Roderick "Chip Fu" Roachford – main artist
- Lennox "Poc Fu" Maturine – main artist
- Joseph "Moc Fu" Jones – main artist
- Shaquille O'Neal – featured artist (track 10)
- Rod 'KP' Kirkpatrick – producer (tracks: 1, 3, 7, 9, 11), mixing (track 7), re-mixing (track 11)
- Kevin "K-Cut" McKenzie – producer (tracks: 2, 10), mixing (track 10)
- J. "Jim Nice" Fields – producer (track 4)
- Joseph "Diamond D" Kirkland – producer (tracks: 5, 6)
- Lyvio R. Gay – producer (track 8)
- Kerry Crafton – recording (tracks: 1, 3, 9)
- Steve Neat – recording (tracks: 1, 3, 5, 8, 9)
- Ron Allaire – mixing (tracks: 1–5, 9), recording (track 5)
- Adam Kudzin – recording (tracks: 2, 4, 5, 7, 8), engineering assistant (track 6), mixing (track 7)
- Chris Trevett – recording (track 2), mixing (track 6)
- Tim Latham – recording (tracks: 2, 6)
- Tony Smalios – recording (track 8)
- Troy Hightower – mixing (track 8)
- Anthony Saunders – recording (track 10)
- Gary Platt – recording (track 10)
- Gary Glugston – mixing (track 10)
- Rick Rooney – re-mixing (track 11)
- Tony Dawsey – mastering
- Carolyn Quan – design
- Carl Posey – photography

== Charts ==
Chart (1994)	Peak position
US Billboard 200	81
US Top R&B/Hip-Hop Albums (Billboard)	19
