= Something About April II =

Studio album by Adrian Younge
- Released: January 22, 2016
- Studio: Linear Labs (Los Angeles, California)
- Length: 36:21
- Label: Linear Labs
- Producer: Adrian Younge

Adrian Younge chronology
Adrian Younge Presents the Delfonics (2013)	Something About April II (2016)	The Electronique Void: Black Noise (2016)

Something About April II is a studio album by American record producer, composer, and multi-instrumentalist Adrian Younge. It was released on January 22, 2016, through Linear Labs. It received universal acclaim from critics.

== Background ==
Adrian Younge is an American record producer, composer, and multi-instrumentalist from Los Angeles. Something About April II is the second installment of his Something About April series of albums, following Something about April (2011) and preceding Something About April III (2025). It includes contributions from vocalists Loren Oden, Karolina, Stereolab's Lætitia Sadier, Bilal, Raphael Saadiq, and Saudia Yasmein. Prior to the album's release, RZA released his remix version of the track "Hands of God" in 2015. The album was released on January 22, 2016, through Linear Labs.

An instrumental version of the album was later released on February 12, 2016.

== Critical reception ==
Professional ratings
Aggregate scores
Source	Rating
Metacritic	83/100
Review scores
Source	Rating
AllMusic	4/5 stars
Exclaim!	7/10
HipHopDX	4.0/5
Pitchfork	8.0/10
Q	4/5 stars

According to the review aggregator Metacritic, Something About April II received "universal acclaim" based on a weighted average score of 83 out of 100 from 7 critic scores.

Andy Kellman of AllMusic wrote, "Though a couple cuts aren't as quick to stick to memory as the sweet and sour soul displayed throughout the stunning 2011 album, this less novel but engrossing sequel is another worthy addition to the Younge discography." Andre Grant of HipHopDX commented that "The sounds are jaw-dropping on this one, each note masterfully arranged to create both mood and nuance."

In 2017, Andrew Sacher of BrooklynVegan included the track "La Ballade" in his list of the "30 Essential Psychedelic Soul Songs".

== Track listing ==
Something About April II track listing
No.	Title	Writer(s)	Length
1.	"Sittin' by the Radio"	Loren Oden; Adrian Younge	2:07
2.	"Winter Is Here"	Karolina	3:27
3.	"Sandrine"	Oden; Younge	2:58
4.	"Step Beyond"	Lætitia Sadier	2:45
5.	"Sea Motet"	Younge	2:30
6.	"Memories of War"	Sadier	2:43
7.	"Psalms"	Younge	2:19
8.	"Magic Music"	Younge	2:29
9.	"Ready to Love"	Oden; Sadier	3:12
10.	"La Ballade"	Bilal; Sadier; Younge	2:50
11.	"April Sonata"	Younge	3:59
12.	"Hands of God"	Karolina; Sadier	2:49
13.	"Hear My Love"	Karolina	2:14
Total length:			36:21

== Personnel ==
Credits adapted from liner notes.

- Adrian Younge – production, recording, mixing
- Venice Dawn – performance
- Loren Oden – lead vocals (1, 3, 7, 9, 13), background vocals (1–3, 8, 9, 13)
- Hannah Blumenfeld – strings (2, 3, 5, 7, 9, 11–13)
- Jack Waterson – electric guitar (2, 8, 9, 13), chanting (12)
- Karolina – lead vocals (2, 12, 13)
- John Herndon – drums (4)
- Lætitia Sadier – lead vocals (4, 6, 9, 10, 12), background vocals (4, 6, 9)
- Bilal – lead vocals (4, 10), background vocals (4)
- Raphael Saadiq – lead vocals (8), background vocals (8)
- Saudia Yasmein – lead vocals (8), background vocals (8)
- Brooke DeRosa – background vocals (11)
- Todd Simon – trumpet (12), French horn (12)
- Dave Cooley – mastering
- Andrew Lojero – executive production
- HB District – design
- The Artform Studio – photography
