= Jazz Is Dead =

Jazz Is Dead may refer to

- Jazz Is Dead (band): a Grateful Dead instrumental cover band
- Jazz Is Dead (record label): a Los Angeles record label and recording series
