= The American Negro =

Studio album by Adrian Younge
- Released: February 26, 2021
- Studios: Linear Labs (Los Angeles, California)
- Genres: R&B; jazz
- Length: 52:39
- Label: Jazz Is Dead
- Producer: Adrian Younge

Adrian Younge chronology
Doug Carn JID005 (2020)	The American Negro (2021)	Gary Bartz JID006 (2021)

The American Negro is a studio album by American record producer, composer, and multi-instrumentalist Adrian Younge. It was released on February 26, 2021, through Jazz Is Dead. It received generally favorable reviews from critics.

== Background ==
Adrian Younge is an American record producer, composer, and multi-instrumentalist from Los Angeles. The American Negro is a part of a multimedia project released to coincide with Black History Month. A four-episode podcast, Invisible Blackness with Adrian Younge, features guest appearances from Chuck D, Ladybug Mecca, Keyon Harrold, and Michael Jai White. A short film, T.A.N., is written, edited, directed, and scored by Younge.

The American Negro dissects "the evolution of racism in America and systemic challenges faced by people of color." In a 2021 interview, Younge said, "It's as if James Baldwin hooked up with Marvin Gaye to make a record produced by David Axelrod." The album's cover art depicts Younge hanging from a tree, designed to look like a lynching postcard. "James Mincey Jr." is a tribute song to the man of the same name, who was killed by police chokehold in 1982. He was the uncle of Loren Oden, who provides vocals on the song. All the instruments on the album, with the exception of the orchestra, are played by Younge.

The album was released on February 26, 2021, through Jazz Is Dead.

== Critical reception ==
Professional ratings
Aggregate scores
Source	Rating
Metacritic	64/100
Review scores
Source	Rating
AllMusic	4/5 stars
Flood Magazine	9/10
The Observer	4/5 stars
Pitchfork	4.0/10
Record Collector	4/5 stars
The Sydney Morning Herald	4/5 stars
Uncut	6/10

According to the review aggregator Metacritic, The American Negro received "generally favorable reviews" based on a weighted average score of 64 out of 100 from 4 critic scores.

Ammar Kalia of The Observer described the album as "a 26-track part-spoken word, part-orchestral examination of the structural racism underpinning the identity of modern America." He added, "it is Younge's impassioned spoken-word interludes – dissecting everything from the Frantz Fanon-referencing double consciousness of racial awareness to the creation of racism to solidify class structures – that give this record its unique tone and profundity." Charles Waring of Record Collector wrote, "A mixture of spoken narrative and music, Younge channels the spirits of Curtis Mayfield and Marvin Gaye, creating immersive jazz-infused soul and funk grooves." Andy Kellman of AllMusic commented that Younge "addresses the audience with warmth and love throughout the album, spreading knowledge and impelling action without being excessively didactic."

Meanwhile, Stephen Kearse of Pitchfork stated, "Younge is clearly writing from a place of real indignation, but his hamfisted diatribes are so lifeless and incoherent the record collapses under the inertia." He called The American Negro "a concept album without an essence, agitprop that doesn't know what it's agitating for, citing everything and saying nothing."

The album was nominated for Best Jazz Record at the 2022 Libera Awards.

=== Accolades ===
Year-end lists for The American Negro
Publication	List	Rank	Ref.
AllMusic	Favorite R&B Albums	—	
Jazzwise	The Best Jazz Albums of 2021	—	
The Vinyl Factory	Our 50 Favourite Albums of 2021	31	

== Track listing ==
All tracks are written by Adrian Younge, except "James Mincey Jr." co-written by Loren Oden and "Light on the Horizon" co-written by Sam Dew.

The American Negro track listing
No.	Title	Length
1.	"Revisionist History"	1:30
2.	"The American Negro"	4:36
3.	"The Black Broadcast"	0:46
4.	"Revolutionize"	3:22
5.	"Double Consciousness"	0:40
6.	"Watch the Children"	1:55
7.	"Dying on the Run"	2:31
8.	"Intransigence of the Blind"	0:57
9.	"James Mincey Jr."	2:41
10.	"Disadvantaged Without a Title"	0:39
11.	"Mama (Will You Make It)"	1:50
12.	"The Black Queen"	0:07
13.	"Margaret Garner"	2:56
14.	"Race Is Fallacy"	1:50
15.	"Light on the Horizon"	3:06
16.	"A Symphony for Sahara"	3:05
17.	"America Is Listening"	0:27
18.	"The March of America"	2:19
19.	"Paradox of the Positive"	0:07
20.	"The Death March"	2:09
21.	"Black Lives Matter"	1:20
22.	"Rotten Roses"	3:07
23.	"Jim Crow's Dance"	1:14
24.	"Patriotic Portraits"	2:12
25.	"George Stinney Jr."	5:01
26.	"Sullen Countenance"	2:16
Total length:		52:39

== Personnel ==
Credits adapted from liner notes.

- Adrian Younge – dialogue, instruments, production, recording, mixing
- Linear Labs Orchestra – performance
- Loren Oden – chorus
- Sam Harmonix – chorus
- Chester Gregory – chorus
- Jazmin Hicks – chorus, photography
- Dave Cooley – mastering
- Andrew Lojero – executive production
- Julian Montague – album design
