= Adrian Younge Presents the Delfonics =

Studio album by Adrian Younge and the Delfonics
- Released: March 12, 2013
- Studio: Linear Labs (Los Angeles, California)
- Genre: R&B
- Length: 34:37
- Label: Wax Poetics
- Producer: Adrian Younge

Adrian Younge chronology
Something about April (2011)	Adrian Younge Presents the Delfonics (2013)	Something About April II (2016)

Adrian Younge Presents the Delfonics is a collaborative studio album by American musicians Adrian Younge and William Hart of the Delfonics. It was released on March 12, 2013, through Wax Poetics Records. It received universal acclaim from critics.

== Background ==
Adrian Younge is an American record producer, composer, and multi-instrumentalist from Los Angeles. William Hart was an American vocalist and founding member of the Delfonics. Adrian Younge Presents the Delfonics is a collaborative studio album by Younge and Hart. It contains 13 tracks, written by Younge and Hart and recorded with Younge's band. A music video was released for the track "Stop and Look (And You Have Found Love)". The album was released on March 12, 2013, through Wax Poetics Records.

== Critical reception ==
Professional ratings
Aggregate scores
Source	Rating
Metacritic	84/100
Review scores
Source	Rating
AllMusic	4/5 stars
Exclaim!	8/10
Pitchfork	7.5/10
PopMatters	9/10
Slant Magazine	3.5/5 stars

According to the review aggregator Metacritic, Adrian Younge Presents the Delfonics received "universal acclaim" based on a weighted average score of 84 out of 100 from 6 critic scores.

Maria Schurr of PopMatters commented that "the album sounds more like a lost classic from the '70s that's still a thrill to spin than a bid for contemporary credibility." Jesse Cataldo of Slant Magazine called the album "already miles ahead of most competitors in the nostalgia field." Andy Kellman of AllMusic wrote, "Considering that Hart is approaching his 70th year, it's remarkable that his falsetto remains so powerful and penetratingly bittersweet." Matt Bauer of Exclaim! stated, "Though a bit short at 36 minutes, there isn't a weak track to be heard."

=== Accolades ===
Year-end lists for Adrian Younge Presents the Delfonics
Publication	List	Rank	Ref.
AllMusic	AllMusic's Favorite R&B Albums of 2013	—	

== Track listing ==
All tracks are written by Adrian Younge and William Hart.

Adrian Younge Presents the Delfonics track listing
No.	Title	Length
1.	"Stop and Look (And You Have Found Love)"	2:46
2.	"Lost Without You"	3:02
3.	"True Love"	2:54
4.	"Silently"	2:37
5.	"Enemies"	1:58
6.	"To Be Your One"	3:02
7.	"Stand Up"	2:48
8.	"Just Love"	2:12
9.	"So in Love with You"	1:34
10.	"I Can't Cry No More"	3:11
11.	"Lover's Melody"	2:38
12.	"Party's Over"	3:05
13.	"Life Never Ends"	2:50
Total length:		34:37

== Personnel ==
Credits adapted from liner notes.

Vocals

- William Hart – lead vocals (1–7, 9–13), background vocals (3, 8)
- Om'Mas Keith – background vocals (1)
- Saudia Mills – background vocals (1, 2, 4, 6, 8–10, 12), female lead vocals (6, 8, 9, 11, 12)
- Loren Oden – background vocals (2, 6–8, 10, 12, 13), second male lead vocals (6), male lead vocals (8)
- Dasjuan Rose – background vocals (6)
- Darren Lee – second male lead vocals (9), background vocals (9)

Instruments

- Adrian Younge – instruments, production, horn arrangement, mixing
- Todd Simon – trumpet (1–4, 6, 10, 12, 13), euphonium (2), flugelhorn (2, 4, 6, 10, 12, 13), muted trumpet (4), French horn (12, 13), horn arrangement
- Jack Waterson – rhythm guitar (1), electric guitar (8, 10)
- Dave Henderson – drums (1, 2, 9–12), percussion (2, 9)
- Alfred Fratti – flute (2, 9)
- Hannah Blumenfeld – violin (3, 4, 9–11), cello (11)
- C. E. Garcia – tremolo guitar (5)

Other personnel

- Dave Cooley – mastering
- Brian DiGenti – executive production
- Andre Torres – executive production
- Dennis Coxen – executive production
- The Artform Studio – photography
- B+ – photography
- Freddy Anzures – design
- Elvis "The Popper" Mangione – liner notes

== Charts ==
Chart performance for Adrian Younge Presents the Delfonics
Chart (2013)	Peak position
US Top R&B/Hip-Hop Albums (Billboard)	72
