= Dance Tonight (Lucy Pearl song) =

2000 single by Lucy Pearl

Single by Lucy Pearl

from the album Lucy Pearl
- Released: March 27, 2000
- Genre: R&B; funk
- Length: 3:41
- Label: Pookie; Beyond Music
- Songwriters: Raphael Saadiq; Ali Shaheed Muhammad; Dawn Robinson
- Producers: Ali Shaheed Muhammad; Raphael Saadiq; Jake & The Phatman

Lucy Pearl singles chronology
"Dance Tonight" (2000)	"Don't Mess with My Man" (2000)

"Dance Tonight" is a song by American R&B group Lucy Pearl, written by Raphael Saadiq, Ali Shaheed Muhammad, and Dawn Robinson. It is the first single taken from their self-titled debut album. Serviced to radio on the week of March 27, 2000, as the group's debut single, "Dance Tonight" peaked at number 36 on both the US Billboard Hot 100 and the UK Singles Chart, and it reached the top 40 in Canada and the Netherlands. It was nominated to Best R&B Performance by a Duo or Group at the 43rd Grammy Awards (2001) but lost to Destiny's Child's "Say My Name".

== Critical reception ==
Billboard editor Chuck Taylor wrote of the song, calling "Dance Tonight" a "smooth uptempo track that truly makes you want to dance tonight." He praised the vocal performances of Raphael Saadiq and Dawn Robinson, noting that Saadiq's vocals were "easy to distinguish" and reminiscent of his career with Tony! Toni! Toné! while describing Robinson's backing vocals as "sweet and sensual."

== Music video ==
The music video for the song shows Ali Shaheed Muhammad, Dawn Robinson, and Raphael Saadiq preparing to go a dance party being held at night. The TV shows all members' past music videos by their groups: Don't Let Go (Love), Find A Way, and Let's Get Down. Interspersed with scenes from the New Line film, Love & Basketball, are scenes from the video, which include Robinson repeatedly being shown topless, putting makeup on in front of a mirror. A later scene shows her getting up in slow motion.

== Track listings ==
UK CD single

1. "Dance Tonight" – 3:52
2. "Dance Tonight" (Linslee Campbell mix) – 4:05
3. "Dance Tonight" (Groove Chronicles mix) – 5:27
4. "Dance Tonight" (video) – 3:41

UK 12-inch single

A1. "Dance Tonight" – 3:52
A2. "Dance Tonight" (Groove Chronicles mix) – 5:27
B1. "Dance Tonight" (Linslee Campbell mix) – 4:05

UK cassette single

1. "Dance Tonight" – 3:52
2. "Dance Tonight" (Linslee Campbell mix) – 4:05
3. "Dance Tonight" (Groove Chronicles mix) – 5:27

European CD single

1. "Dance Tonight" – 3:52
2. "Dance Tonight" (Linslee Campbell mix radio edit) – 3:23

== Charts ==
=== Weekly charts ===
Chart (2000–2001)	Peak position
Belgium (Ultratip Bubbling Under Flanders)	10
Belgium (Ultratip Bubbling Under Wallonia)	4
Canada Top Singles (RPM)	28
Canada Dance/Urban (RPM)	13
France (SNEP)	78
Netherlands (Dutch Top 40)	38
Netherlands (Single Top 100)	47
Scottish Singles Sales (Official Charts)	68
UK Singles (Official Charts)	36
UK Dance (Official Charts)	3
UK Hip Hop/R&B (Official Charts)	5
US Billboard Hot 100	36
US Hot R&B/Hip-Hop Songs (Billboard)	5
US Rhythmic Airplay (Billboard)	35

=== Year-end charts ===
Chart (2000)	Position
UK Urban (Music Week)	19
US Hot R&B/Hip-Hop Singles & Tracks (Billboard)	27
US Hot Soundtrack Singles (Billboard)	9

== Certifications ==
Certifications for "Dance Tonight"
Region	Certification	Certified units/sales
New Zealand (RMNZ)	Gold	15,000^{‡}
^{‡} Sales+streaming figures based on certification alone.

== Release history ==
Region	Date	Format(s)	Label(s)	Ref.
United States	March 27, 2000	Radio	Pookie; Beyond Music	
Australia	April 17, 2000	CD	EMI Australia	
United Kingdom	July 17, 2000	CD; cassette	Virgin	
