= Lucy Pearl =

R&B supergroup formed in 1999

- Origin: U.S.
- Genres: R&B; hip hop; neo soul
- Years active: 1999–2001
- Label: Beyond Music
- Spinoffs: En Vogue; Tony! Toni! Toné!; A Tribe Called Quest
- Past members: Raphael Saadiq; Dawn Robinson; Ali Shaheed Muhammad; Joi

Lucy Pearl was an American R&B supergroup formed in 1999. The group was composed of Raphael Saadiq (formerly of Tony! Toni! Toné!), Dawn Robinson (formerly of En Vogue), and Ali Shaheed Muhammad (formerly of A Tribe Called Quest).

== History ==
In 1998, Saadiq departed from his group Tony! Toni! Toné!, following the release of their final studio album House of Music (1996). The following year, Saadiq contacted Ali Shaheed Muhammad then Dawn Robinson with the idea of forming a new supergroup. After Muhammad and Robinson accepted Saadiq's offer, the group officially formed and began recording an album under the group name Lucy Pearl.

Saadiq shared that the group was originally supposed to consist of Grammy Award winning singer/songwriter D'Angelo, Muhammad, and himself but ultimately Dawn was brought in to replace D'Angelo after he dropped out because of scheduling conflicts due to him working on his second album Voodoo around the same time.

In May 2000, Lucy Pearl released their self-titled album on Beyond Music. The album's lead single "Dance Tonight", released in March 2000, charted in top 40 on the Billboard Hot 100 chart and in the top five on R&B chart. The song was also nominated for Best R&B Performance by a Duo or Group at the 43rd Grammy Awards. In August 2000, the album Lucy Pearl became certified gold by the Recording Industry Association of America. In September 2000, the group released their second single "Don't Mess with My Man" which received chart success outside of the United States. In October 2000, Robinson left the group.

In November 2000, Lucy Pearl appeared on the BET show 106 & Park to announce the new addition of singer Joi to the lineup. The group also debuted their music video for the single "Without You". After the release of the final single "You", Lucy Pearl disbanded in late 2001. Both Robinson and Saadiq continue to perform Lucy Pearl songs during their individual tour sets.

In 2009, a reunion was attempted but failed after Muhammad started a lawsuit against Saadiq. Robinson declined the reunion after Saadiq initially refused to move forward with the release of the Lucy Pearl album in 1999, which caused Robinson to lose her home. Robinson also cited Saadiq's jealousy towards herself and Muhammad as another reason for declining a reunion. In 2020, Robinson participated in various interviews, discussing Lucy Pearl. Robinson explained that the group was originally formed to do one album and after their tour was complete, the group had already agreed to disband. Robinson also alleged that she didn't know she was replaced until being contacted for an interview by a Rolling Stone magazine journalist and later saw Saadiq and Muhammad along with Joi on the television show 106 & Park.

== Awards and nominations ==
Award	Year	Nominee(s)	Category	Result	Ref.
My VH1 Music Awards	2000	Lucy Pearl	Best-Kept Secret	Nominated	
Grammy Awards	2001	"Dance Tonight"	Best R&B Performance by a Duo or Group with Vocal	Nominated	

== Members ==
- Raphael Saadiq (1999–2001)
- Dawn Robinson (1999–2000)
- Ali Shaheed Muhammad (1999–2001)
- Joi (2000–2001)

== Discography ==
=== Albums ===
Title	Album details	Peak chart positions									Certifications
Title	Album details	US	US R&B /HH	CAN	DEN	FRA	NLD	NZ	SWE	UK	Certifications
Lucy Pearl	Release date: May 23, 2000; Label: Beyond Music; Format: CD, digital download	26	3	15	7	58	58	37	35	82	RIAA: Gold; BPI: Gold

=== Singles ===
Year	Single	Chart positions										Certifications	Album
Year	Single	US	US R&B /HH	CAN	DEN	FRA	NLD	SCO	SWE	SWI	UK	Certifications	Album
"Dance Tonight"	2000	36	5	28	—	78	38	68	—	—	36	RMNZ: Gold	Lucy Pearl
"Don't Mess with My Man"	2000	—	41	—	11	14	35	37	22	29	20	BPI: Silver; RMNZ: Gold	Lucy Pearl
"Without You"	2001	—	—	—	—	—	—	—	—	—	51		Lucy Pearl
"You" (featuring Snoop Dogg and Q-Tip)	2001	—	64	—	—	—	—	—	—	—	—		Lucy Pearl
"Don't Mess with My Man" (Lucy Pearl vs. Soulizm)	2004	—	—	—	—	—	—	—	—	—	181		Non-album single
