= Lucy Pearl (album) =

Studio album by Lucy Pearl
- Released: May 23, 2000
- Genres: R&B; neo soul; hip hop; funk
- Length: 55:28
- Labels: EMI; Virgin; Beyond
- Producers: Raphael Saadiq; Ali Shaheed Muhammad; Jake & The Phatman; DJ Battlecat

Singles from Lucy Pearl
- 1. "Dance Tonight" Released: July 17, 2000; 2. "Don't Mess with My Man" Released: October 31, 2000; 3. "Without You" Released: July 17, 2001; 4. "You" Released: July 17, 2001

Lucy Pearl is the only studio album by supergroup Lucy Pearl. It was released on May 23, 2000, by EMI Records.

== Critical reception ==
Professional ratings
Review scores
Source	Rating
AllMusic	3/5 stars
Entertainment Weekly	B+
Los Angeles Times	3/4 stars
Q	3/5 stars
Rolling Stone	3.5/5 stars
Spin	8/10

David O'Donnell, writing for BBC Music, highlighted the group's super-group status and noted the album's blend of live soul instrumentation with hip-hop production techniques, involving polished fusion of styles and high-profile collaborations. Colin Ross of PopMatters described Lucy Pearl as a collaborative R&B/hip-hop supergroup effort built on "unexpected collaborations" and "laid back hip-hop," showing the artists moving beyond their former group.

== Track listing ==
Lucy Pearl track listing
No.	Title	Writer(s)	Producer(s)	Length
1.	"Lucy Pearl's Way"	Raphael Saadiq; Rokusuke Ei; Hachidai Nakamura; Christian Riley; Kamaal Fareed; Ali Shaheed Muhammad; Malik Taylor; Ronald Foster	Saadiq; Muhammad	2:52
2.	"Trippin'"	Saadiq; Dawn Robinson	Saadiq; Muhammad; Jake and the Phatman	3:04
3.	"Dance Tonight"	Saadiq; Robinson; Muhammad	Saadiq; Muhammad; Jake and the Phatman^{[a]}	3:41
4.	"LaLa"	Saadiq; Robinson	Saadiq; Muhammad; Jake and the Phatman	3:30
5.	"Everyday"	Saadiq	Saadiq	4:00
6.	"Can't Stand Your Mother"	Saadiq; Robinson; Conesha Owens	Saadiq; Jake and the Phatman^{[a]}	3:43
7.	"Good Love"	Saadiq; Robinson; Muhammad	Saadiq; Muhammad; Jake and the Phatman^{[a]}	4:10
8.	"Without You"	Saadiq; Kelvin Wooten; Alvie Wiggins	Saadiq; Muhammad^{[a]}	3:57
9.	"Don't Mess with My Man"	Saadiq; Robinson; Owens	Saadiq; Muhammad	3:37
10.	"Hollywood"	Saadiq; Robinson; Muhammad; Owens; Allen Collins; Gary Rossington; Ronnie Van Zant	Saadiq; Muhammad	3:51
11.	"Remember the Times"	Saadiq	Saadiq	3:06
12.	"They Can't"	Saadiq; Robinson; Muhammad; Christopher Wallace; Robert Diggs	Saadiq; Muhammad	3:09
13.	"Do It for the People"	Saadiq	Saadiq; Muhammad	2:32
14.	"You" (featuring Snoop Dogg and Q-Tip)	Saadiq; Calvin Broadus; Kamaal Fareed; Kevin Gilliam
Total length:				55:28

Notes

- ^{^[a]} signifies a co-producer
- ^{^[r]} signifies a remixer

Samples

- "Lucy Pearl's Way" contains an interpolation of "Ask of You" by Raphael Saadiq and a sample from "Electric Relaxation" by A Tribe Called Quest.
- "Hollywood" contains an interpolation of "Cry For The Bad Man" by Lynyrd Skynyrd.
- "They Can't" contains a sample from "Long Kiss Goodnight" by the Notorious B.I.G.

== Charts ==
=== Weekly charts ===
Weekly chart performance for Lucy Pearl
Chart (2000)	Peak position
Canada Top Albums/CDs (RPM)	15
Canadian R&B Albums (Nielsen SoundScan)	13
Danish Albums (Hitlisten)	7
Dutch Albums (Album Top 100)	58
French Albums (SNEP)	58
Irish Albums (IRMA)	42
New Zealand Albums (RMNZ)	37
Swedish Albums (Sverigetopplistan)	35
Swiss Albums (Schweizer Hitparade)	88
UK Albums (Official Charts)	82
UK R&B Albums (Official Charts)	14
US Billboard 200	26
US Top R&B/Hip-Hop Albums (Billboard)	3

=== Year-end charts ===
Year-end chart performance for Lucy Pearl
Chart (2000)	Position
Canadian Albums (Nielsen SoundScan)	156
US Billboard 200	186
US Top R&B/Hip-Hop Albums (Billboard)	62

== Certifications ==
Certifications for Lucy Pearl
Region	Certification	Certified units/sales
Canada (Music Canada)	Gold	50,000^{^}
France (SNEP)	Gold	100,000^{*}
United Kingdom (BPI)	Gold	100,000^{‡}
United States (RIAA)	Gold	500,000^{^}
^{*} Sales figures based on certification alone.^{^} Shipments figures based on certification alone.^{‡} Sales+streaming figures based on certification alone.
