= Mr. 3000 =

2004 film by Charles Stone III

- Theatrical release poster
- Directed by: Charles Stone III
- Screenplay by: Eric Champnella; Keith Mitchell; Howard Michael Gould
- Story by: Eric Champnella; Keith Mitchell
- Produced by: Gary Barber; Roger Birnbaum; Maggie Wilde
- Starring: Bernie Mac; Paul Sorvino; Chris Noth; Michael Rispoli; Angela Bassett
- Cinematography: Shane Hurlbut
- Edited by: Bill Pankow
- Music by: John Powell
- Production companies: Touchstone Pictures; Dimension Films; Spyglass Entertainment; The Kennedy/Marshall Company
- Distributed by: Buena Vista Pictures Distribution
- Release date: September 17, 2004
- Running time: 104 minutes
- Country: United States
- Language: English
- Budget: $30 million
- Box office: $21,839,377

Mr. 3000 is a 2004 American sports comedy film directed by Charles Stone III. It stars Bernie Mac and Angela Bassett. The film's plot surrounds a retired Major League Baseball player who makes a comeback at age 47 in order to attain 3,000 hits. Mr. 3000 was produced by Touchstone Pictures, Dimension Films, Spyglass Entertainment and The Kennedy/Marshall Company and released by Buena Vista Pictures Distribution on September 17, 2004. The film received mixed reviews from critics and was a box-office flop, grossing $21,839,377 worldwide against a $30 million budget.

== Plot ==
Stan Ross is the conceited star player of the Milwaukee Brewers baseball team. After recording his 3,000th hit, Ross immediately retires, leaving the team without one of its star players in the middle of the 1995 playoff race, showing every bit of disregard for his teammates' feelings that his decision will cost them the championship. During the next nine years, Ross uses his nickname as a business tool, owning several profitable properties under the name "Mr. 3000" that make him increasingly wealthy.

In 2004, the Brewers retire Ross' number to boost attendance for their now-struggling team. Although many fans do come to the ceremony, other players, including teammates and fellow stars Robin Yount, Cecil Cooper, and Paul Molitor, stay away. Only his best friend Anthony “Boca” Carter and a middle relief pitcher from his early days in the majors named Bill “Big Horse” Berelli attend, and the ex-pitcher chastises Ross for his arrogant attitude.

Ross learns that due to a clerical error (caused by a three-hit game suspended due to curfew being double counted), he retired with 2,997 hits instead of 3,000. The error also partially contributes to Ross not being voted into the Baseball Hall of Fame and makes his "Mr. 3000" marketing gimmick inaccurate. Ross seeks to return to the game at the age of 47 to get three more hits and salvage his legacy and reputation.

A top Brewers executive, citing the large attendance at Ross' number retirement ceremony and the fact that the Brewers are out of playoff contention, agrees to bring Ross back during the September roster expansion. The team's younger players by contrast see him as a disgrace, and team superstar Rex "T-Rex" Pennebaker, who is pompous and arrogant like Ross, claims he is unneeded and too old to play. Longtime team manager Gus Panas refuses to so much as speak a word to Ross, and the local sportswriters take every opportunity to criticize him.

Despite his earlier predictions, Ross struggles to regain his baseball form and goes hitless in his first 27 at-bats. His comeback is covered by television sportscaster Maureen "Mo" Simmons, who rekindles a past romantic relationship with him. Ross eventually gets two hits, including a home run, bringing his career total to 2,999.

Ross becomes a mentor to the younger players and urges Pennebaker to learn from his own mistakes and be a team player, so that Pennebaker will not end up like him – all alone. This inspires the Brewers to a late-season comeback and a respectable finish. Ross attempts to become serious with Simmons and make her a permanent part of his life, but she is reluctant to believe he is a changed man, particularly after he skips a team practice to go on national television with Jay Leno and soak in all the attention he is receiving.

In his final at-bat of the season, with a chance to achieve his 3,000th hit, Ross has a vision of his younger days when he was in his prime and cherished by his team. Inspired by this memory, he sacrifices his milestone by laying down a bunt, allowing the Brewers to win the game and secure third place in their division. Although he never reaches the 3,000-hit mark, his selflessness and renewed outlook earn him a place in the Hall of Fame. He renames his businesses "Mr. 2,999" and is last seen driving an ice cream truck with the slogan "2,999 possible combinations!"

== Cast ==
- Bernie Mac as Stan "Mr. 3000" Ross (#21, 1B)
- Paul Sorvino as Gus Panas (#45, Manager)
- Chris Noth as Schiembri
- Michael Rispoli as Anthony "Boca" Carter
- Brian White as Rex "T-Rex" Pennebaker (#31, CF)
- Angela Bassett as Maureen Simmons
- Evan Jones as Fryman (#17, C)
- Earl Billings as Lenny Koron (#53, Coach)
- Dondre Whitfield as Skillet (#1, SS)
- Ian Anthony Dale as Kenji Fukuda (#37, starting pitcher)
- Amaury Nolasco as Jorge Minadeo (#25, 2B)
- Mike Groeschl as Brewers Baseball Executive
- John Schwab as Umpire
- Keegan-Michael Key as Reporter

== Production ==
In May 1994, it was reported that 3000, a script by Eric Champnella and Keith Mitchell focusing on a retired player whose record of 3,000 hits is suddenly found to be three short, had become the subject of a bidding war. Among the potential bidders were Touchstone Pictures, Douglas/Reuther Productions, Richard Gere, TriStar Pictures and Universal Pictures. That same month, Touchstone had submitted the winning bid and had begun negotiations with Gere to star in the film with the two having previously collaborated on the hit Pretty Woman (which ironically began under the working title 3000 in reference to the price for the services rendered by Julia Roberts' character). The film had major support behind then Walt Disney Studios chairman Joe Roth who cited his involvement with Major League and White Men Can't Jump noting the reliable success of sports movies and being easy ways to tell stories. In May 1996, it was reported that as part of The Kennedy/Marshall Company's first look deal with Disney, Frank Marshall would direct Mr. 3000 with rewrites by Ron Shelton. In March 2002, following a lengthy period of inactivity, it was reported that Touchstone was in negotiations with Callie Khouri and John Travolta to direct and star in Mr. 3000 respectively following the surprise success of The Rookie. Travolta eventually turned down the film because he was busy doing promotional work for Qantas. In January 2003, it was reported that Bernie Mac would now star in the film with the film taking a more comedic tone as opposed to the more dramatic tone it had in earlier incarnations. In March of that year, it was reported that Charles Stone III had signed on to direct and that Dimension Films would co-produce the film with Disney who would handle worldwide distribution.

Portions of the film were filmed at Marquette University High School, as well as Miller Park, in Milwaukee, Wisconsin, and at Zephyr Field in New Orleans, Louisiana.

== Reception ==
=== Critical response ===
Mr. 3000 garnered mixed reviews from critics. On the review aggregator website Rotten Tomatoes, 54% of 112 critics' reviews are positive, with an average rating of 5.8/10. The website's consensus reads: "Bernie Mac demonstrates he can play the game even if the movie's a few innings short of a complete game." Metacritic, which uses a weighted average, assigned the film a score of 57 out of 100, based on 27 critics, indicating "mixed or average" reviews. Audiences polled by CinemaScore gave the film an average grade of "B" on an A+ to F scale.

Roger Ebert praised Bernie Mac for delivering a "funny and kind of touching performance" that's believable, Bassett for infusing a "convincing emotional spirit" into her character and the film overall for sidestepping its sports comedy formula, saying "to my surprise, it finds a variation." Anita Gates of The New York Times gave praise to Stone III for directing a film that mixes "laughter and meaning" thanks to the "bull's eye-casting" of his supporting players and Mac for crafting a multi-layered character, concluding that, "[I]f there was any question about how well [Bernie] Mac's charm, demonstrated in stand-up comedy and on his Fox sitcom, would play on the big screen, the news is good: no problem." Kevin Thomas from the Los Angeles Times praised Mac for giving "range and resonance" to his title character and the filmmakers for being able to "reconfigure[d] a sports movie plot to bring to it depth as well as laughter, and, better yet, made it unpredictable." He concluded that, "Mr. 3000 is good-looking and smooth, with a great soundtrack that communicates just how intoxicating the roar of the crowd can be to an athlete. But it's more than the expected gleaming Hollywood production. The movie's images of Stan grappling with his destiny all alone are at once easy to identify with and hard to shake off." Scott Tobias of The A.V. Club said, "Sputtering along on Mac's sleepy improvisations, Mr. 3000 volleys between the dumb, frat-house wackiness of Major League and the "Wonder Bat" schmaltz of The Natural, chasing the gags with a lame baseball-as-life message about playing for the right reasons." Marrit Ingman of The Austin Chronicle said it pales in comparison to Stone III's debut effort Drumline, in terms of that film's "amiability and no-nonsense moral center", and replacing it with numerous sports montages, "lowbrow gags" and "lazy, shorthanded characterizations."

=== Box office ===
The film took over $8 million at the box office on its opening weekend. In all, it took $21,811,169 in the US and Canada, and a further $28,190 when it was released in Spain, for a global total of $21,839,377.

=== Accolades ===
Mac won Best Actor, Comedy or Musical at the 6th Black Reel Awards.

== Soundtrack ==
1. "Shining Star" – Earth, Wind & Fire
2. "Jungle Boogie" – Kool & the Gang
3. "Ain't No Stoppin' Us Now" – McFadden & Whitehead
4. "Let's Get It On" – Marvin Gaye
5. "Why Can't We Be Friends" – War & Peace
6. "Respect Yourself" – The Staple Singers
7. "Let's Groove" – Earth, Wind & Fire
8. "I Gotcha" – Joe Tex
9. "Getting Nasty" – Ike & Tina Turner
10. "Super Bad" – James Brown
11. "Turn Back the Hands of Time" – Tyrone Davis
12. "The Best Is Yet to Come" – Steve Lawrence
13. "If You Don't Know Me by Now" – Calvin Richardson
14. "It Takes Two" – Rob Base

== See also ==
- List of baseball films
