= Ventilation: Da LP =

Studio album by Phife Dawg
- Released: 2000
- Recorded: 1999–2000
- Genre: Hip hop
- Length: 48:12
- Label: Groove Attack
- Producer: Jay Dee; Pete Rock; Rick Rock; Hi-Tek

Phife Dawg chronology
Ventilation: Da LP (2000)	Forever (2022)

Singles from Ventilation: Da LP
- 1. "Bend Ova" Released: 1999; 2. "Flawless" Released: 2000

Professional ratings
Review scores
Source	Rating
AllMusic	3/5 stars
RapReviews	7/10
Vibe	3.5/5 stars

Ventilation: Da LP is the debut studio album by the American rapper Phife Dawg, released in 2000. Though the album was not a commercial success, the singles "Bend Ova" and "Flawless" were minor hits. It was the only solo album released during Phife Dawg's lifetime.

== Critical reception ==
The A.V. Club wrote: "Minor but far more charming, intimate, and memorable than Q-Tip's soulless solo album, Ventilation is as endearing as it is inconsequential." MTV deemed the album "brilliant but ignored."

== Track listing ==
#	Title	Featured Guest(s)	Producer	Length	Samples
1	"Intro"	JUS	Allah Ricks & Jason Chung	1:27	
2	"Flawless"		Hi-Tek	3:20	
3	"Alphabet Soup"		Hi-Tek	4:06	*"Dance the Kung-Fu" by Carl Douglas
4	"Miscellaneous"		Supa Dave West	3:23	
5	"D.R.U.G.S."	Hi-Tek	Hi-Tek	4:45	*"I Used To Love H.E.R." by Common
6	"Tha Club Hoppa"	Christina LaForcarde	Rick Rock	4:12	*"Somethin' Funky" by Big Daddy Kane
7	"Lemme Find Out"	Pete Rock	Pete Rock	4:37	*"Don't Let Up" by Olympic Runners
8	"Bend Ova"		Jay Dee	5:32	*"Canto De Ossanha" by Dorothy Ashby
9	"Beats, Rhymes and Phife"	Supa Dave West	Hi-Tek	3:27	*"Legend in His Own Mind" by Gil-Scott Heron
10	"Ventilation"		Fredwreck	4:36	
11	"4 Horsemen (192 N' It)"	Know Naim	Jay Dee	4:21	*"Edges of Illusion" by John Surman
12	"Melody Adonis"		Pete Rock	4:26	
13	"Outro"	JUS	Allah Ricks & Jason Chung	0:38	

== Charts ==
Chart (2000)	Peak position
US Billboard 200	175
US Independent Albums (Billboard)	35
US Top R&B/Hip-Hop Albums (Billboard)	31
