= The Midnight Hour (album) =

Studio album by Ali Shaheed Muhammad and Adrian Younge
- Released: June 8, 2018
- Recorded: Starting 2013
- Studio: Linear Labs Studios, Los Angeles, California, US
- Genre: Post-bop; soul
- Length: 60:42
- Language: English
- Label: Linear Labs

Ali Shaheed Muhammad and Adrian Younge chronology
The Midnight Hour (2018)	The Midnight Hour: Live at Linear Labs (2019)

The Midnight Hour is a collaborative studio album by American musicians Ali Shaheed Muhammad and Adrian Younge. It was released on June 8, 2018, through Linear Labs.

== Critical reception ==
Professional ratings
Review scores
Source	Rating
AllMusic	4.5/5 stars
Exclaim!	7/10
Pitchfork	6.7/10

Editors at AllMusic rated this album 4.5 out of 5 stars, with critic Andy Kellman writing that several tracks are stand-out and "the freer moments are almost as stimulating as the deliberately composed numbers". That outlet also chose it for one of the best rhythm and blues albums of the year and one of the best albums of any genre. Matt Bauer of Exclaim! rated this release a 7 out of 10, for being "both intimate and expansive", creating "a perfect chillout for the woke". Writing for Pitchfork, Brian Josephs praised "a peculiar live intimacy to the production that threads through hollowed-out kick drums and scratchy bass strings" that still upholds the "soulful aesthetic" that bridges "generational and genre gaps between black music’s multitudes".

== Track listing ==
All music composed by Ali Shaheed Muhammad and Adrian Younge.

1. "Black Beacon" – 4:00
2. "Mare" (lyrics by Ladybug Mecca) – 1:06
3. "It’s You" (lyrics by Raphael Saadiq) – 4:56
4. "Questions" (lyrics by CeeLo Green) – 3:27
5. "So Amazing" (lyrics by Luther Vandross) – 4:13
6. "Gate 54" – 4:04
7. "Do It Together" (lyrics by Bilal) – 3:09
8. "Redneph in B Minor" – 2:48
9. "Better Endeavor" – 2:48
10. "Smiling for Me" (lyrics by Karolina) – 3:03
11. "Don’t Keep Me Waiting" (lyrics by Marsha Ambrosius) – 3:18
12. "Bitches Do Voodoo" (lyrics by Angela Munoz) – 0:54
13. "Possibilities" (lyrics by Eryn Allen Kane) – 3:12
14. "Mission" (lyrics by Marsha A.) – 2:56
15. "Dans un moment d’errance" (lyrics by Laetitia Saidier) – 3:03
16. "Love Is Free" (lyrics by Eryn Allen Kane) – 2:44
17. "Together Again" – 3:21
18. "Feel Alive" (lyrics by Karolina and Loren Oden) – 2:57
19. "There Is No Greater Love" (lyrics by Loren Oden and Saudia Yasmein) – 2:19
20. "Ravens" – 2:24

Deluxe Edition bonus disc

1. "Mare" (instrumental) – 1:06
2. "It’s You" (instrumental) – 4:56
3. "Questions" (instrumental) – 3:23
4. "So Amazing" (instrumental) – 4:13
5. "Do It Together" (instrumental) – 3:09
6. "Smiling for Me" (instrumental) – 3:03
7. "Don’t Keep Me Waiting" (instrumental) – 3:18
8. "Bitches Do Voodoo" (instrumental) – 0:54
9. "Possibilities" (instrumental) – 3:12
10. "Dans un moment d’errance" (instrumental) – 3:03
11. "Love Is Free" (instrumental) – 2:44
12. "Feel Alive" (instrumental) – 2:57
13. "There Is No Greater Love" (instrumental) – 2:19

== Personnel ==
"Black Beacon"

- Ali Shaheed Muhammad and Adrian Younge – grand piano, electric bass, vibraphone, flutes, alto saxophone, tenor saxophone, sopranino saxophone, timpani, drums, percussion, recording mixing, production
- Linear Labs Orchestra – orchestrated by Adrian Younge, conducted by Brooke DeRosa

"Maré"

- Ali Shaheed Muhammad and Adrian Younge – upright piano, electric bass, vibraphone, alto saxophone, drums, percussion
- Ladybug Mecca – vocals
- Linear Labs Orchestra – orchestrated by Adrian Younge, conducted by Brooke DeRosa
- Loren Oden – backing vocals
- Saudia Yasmein – backing vocals

"It’s You"

- Ali Shaheed Muhammad and Adrian Younge – Fender Rhodes piano, electric bass, percussion, bass clarinet, sopranino saxophone, alto saxophone, drums
- Raphael Saadiq – electric guitar, vocals
- Linear Labs Orchestra – orchestrated by Adrian Younge, conducted by Brooke DeRosa

"Questions"

- Ali Shaheed Muhammad and Adrian Younge – Fender Rhodes piano, Hammond organ, upright piano, percussion, flute, vibraphone
- CeeLo Green – vocals
- David Henderson – drums
- Linear Labs Orchestra – orchestrated by Adrian Younge, conducted by Brooke DeRosa
- Jack Waterson – acoustic guitar

"So Amazing"

- Ali Shaheed Muhammad and Adrian Younge – Wurlitzer electric piano, electric bass, electric guitar, tubular bells, carillon, celeste, alto saxophone, sopranino saxophone, clarinet, bass clarinet, flutes
- David Henderson – drums, percussion
- Linear Labs Orchestra – orchestrated by Adrian Younge, conducted by Brooke DeRosa
- Luther Vandross – vocals

"Gate 54"

- Ali Shaheed Muhammad and Adrian Younge – grand piano, fender rhodes piano, electric bass, drums
- Linear Labs Orchestra – orchestrated by Adrian Younge, conducted by Brooke DeRosa

"Do It Together"

- Ali Shaheed Muhammad and Adrian Younge – Fender Rhodes piano, electric bass, electric guitar, vibraphone, flutes, alto, tenor saxophone, baritone saxophone
- Bilal – vocals, backing vocals
- David Henderson – drums
- Linear Labs Orchestra – orchestrated by Adrian Younge, conducted by Brooke DeRosa
- Saudia Yasmein – backing vocals

"Redneph in B-Minor"

- Ali Shaheed Muhammad and Adrian Younge – Fender Rhodes piano, electric bass, tubular chimes, electric guitar, vibraphone, drums, percussion
- Linear Labs Orchestra – orchestrated by Adrian Younge, conducted by Brooke DeRosa

"Better Endeavor"

- Ali Shaheed Muhammad and Adrian Younge – Fender Rhodes piano, Hammond organ, electric guitar, electric bass, vibraphone, drums, percussion
- Linear Labs Orchestra – orchestrated by Adrian Younge, conducted by Brooke DeRosa
- Jack Waterson – Guitar

"Smiling for Me"

- Ali Shaheed Muhammad and Adrian Younge – Fender Rhodes piano, electric bass, Hammond organ, analog synthesizer, flutes, alto saxophone
- David Henderson – drums
- Karolina – vocals
- Linear Labs Orchestra – orchestrated by Adrian Younge, conducted by Brooke DeRosa
- Jack Waterson – acoustic guitar

"Don’t Keep Me Waiting"

- Ali Shaheed Muhammad and Adrian Younge – Fender Rhodes piano, electric bass, electric guitar, vibraphone, drums
- Marsha Ambrosius – vocals
- Linear Labs Orchestra – orchestrated by Adrian Younge, conducted by Brooke DeRosa

"Bitches Do Voodoo"

- Adrian Younge – grand piano
- Angela Munoz – vocals

"Possibilities"

- Ali Shaheed Muhammad and Adrian Younge – Fender Rhodes piano, upright piano, electric bass, electric guitar, alto & baritone saxophone, minichime, drums, percussion.
- Eryn Allen Kane – vocals
- Linear Labs Orchestra – orchestrated by Adrian Younge, conducted by Brooke DeRosa

"Mission"

- Ali Shaheed Muhammad and Adrian Younge – Fender Rhodes piano, electric bass, electric guitar, carillon, percussion, analog synthesizers, alto & baritone saxophone, clarinet, flute
- David Henderson – drums
- Linear Labs Orchestra – orchestrated by Adrian Younge, conducted by Brooke DeRosa
- Marsha A. – vocals

"Dans un moment d’errance"

- Ali Shaheed Muhammad and Adrian Younge – Wurlitzer electric piano, Hammond organ, electric bass, analog synthesizer, flutes, alto saxophone
- Keyon Harrold – trumpet
- Linear Labs Orchestra – orchestrated by Adrian Younge, conducted by Brooke DeRosa
- Questlove – drums
- Laetitia Saidier – vocals
- Jack Waterson – acoustic guitar, electric guitar

"Love Is Free"

- Ali Shaheed Muhammad and Adrian Younge – Fender Rhodes piano, electric bass, electric guitars, alto saxophone, drums
- Eryn Allen Kane – vocals
- Linear Labs Orchestra – orchestrated by Adrian Younge, conducted by Brooke DeRosa

"Together Again"

- Ali Shaheed Muhammad and Adrian Younge – electric bass, electric guitar, carillon, alto, baritone & sopranino saxophone, drums
- Linear Labs Orchestra – orchestrated by Adrian Younge, conducted by Brooke DeRosa
- No ID – percussion
- James Poyser – Fender Rhodes piano

"Feel Alive"

- Ali Shaheed Muhammad and Adrian Younge – Fender Rhodes piano, upright piano, Hammond organ, glockenspiel, electric bass, electric guitar, flute, bass flute, alto & baritone saxophone, drums, selene
- Karolina – vocals
- Linear Labs Orchestra – orchestrated by Adrian Younge, conducted by Brooke DeRosa
- Loren Oden – vocals

"There Is No Greater Love"

- Ali Shaheed Muhammad and Adrian Younge – upright piano, electric bass, vibraphone, drums, percussion
- Linear Labs Orchestra – orchestrated by Adrian Younge, conducted by Brooke DeRosa
- Loren Oden – vocals
- Saudia Yasmein – vocals

"Ravens"

- Ali Shaheed Muhammad and Adrian Younge – upright piano, Hammond organ, clavinet, drums, electric bass, electric guitar
- Linear Labs Orchestra – orchestrated by Adrian Younge, conducted by Brooke DeRosa

Technical personnel

- The Artform Studio – photography
- Alice Butts – design
- Dave Cooley – mastering atElysian Masters
- Andrew Lojero – executive production

== Charts ==
Chart performance for The Midnight Hour
Chart (2018)	Peak position
UK Jazz & Blues Albums (OCC)	13

== See also ==
- 2018 in American music
- List of 2018 albums
