= True Fuschnick =

Single by Fu-Schnickens

from the album F.U. Don't Take It Personal
- A-side: "True Fuschnick"
- B-side: "Props"
- Released: August 14, 1992
- Recorded: Battery Studios
- Genre: Hip hop, East Coast hip hop
- Length: 4:07
- Label: Jive
- Producer: A Tribe Called Quest

Fu-Schnickens singles chronology
| "La Schmoove" (1992) | "True Fuschnick" (1992) | "What's Up Doc? (Can We Rock)" (1993) |

"True Fuschnick" is a song by American hip hop group Fu-Schnickens. The song was recorded for the group's debut album F.U. Don't Take It Personal and released as the third and final single for the album in August 1992.

== Track listing ==
12", 33⅓ RPM, Vinyl

1. "True Fuschnick" (LP Version) - 3:58
2. "True Fuschnick" (Shaheed's Fix) - 4:39
3. "Props" - 5:36
4. "True Fuschnick" (Instrumental) - 3:58

CD, Maxi-Single

1. "True Fuschnick" (LP Version) - 3:58
2. "True Fuschnick" (Shaheed's Fix) - 4:39
3. "Props" - 5:36
4. "True Fuschnick" (Instrumental) - 3:58
5. "Ring the Alarm" (Steely & Cleevie Extended Mix) - 4:54

== Personnel ==
Information taken from Discogs.

- mastering – Tom Coyne
- mixing – Fu-Schnickens, Ali Shaheed Muhammad, Bob Power
- production – A Tribe Called Quest, Fu-Schnickens
- recording engineering – Anthony Saunders
- remix engineering – Ali Shaheed Muhammad, Bob Power
- remixing – Ali Shaheed Muhammad, Steely & Clevie
- writing – G. Clinton Jr., G. Cook, J. Jones, L. Maturine, A. Muhammad, R. Roachford

== Chart performance ==
| Chart (1992) | Peak position |
|---|---|
| U.S. Dance Music/Club Play Singles | 14 |
| U.S. Hot Dance Music/Maxi-Singles Sales | 45 |
| U.S. Hot R&B/Hip-Hop Singles & Tracks | 97 |
| U.S. Hot Rap Singles | 18 |
