= Adrian Younge =

American composer (born 1978)

- Younge in 2018

Background information
- Born: May 7, 1978 (age 48)
- Origin: Los Angeles, California, U.S.
- Genres: Psychedelic soul; retro-soul; hip-hop
- Occupations: Composer; arranger; music producer
- Years active: 2000–present
- Labels: Jazz Is Dead; Linear Labs; Wax Poetics

Adrian Younge (born May 7, 1978) is an American composer, arranger and music producer based in the Los Angeles area.

== Background ==
Younge grew up in Fontana, California, United States. His father is a lawyer and Younge himself earned a Juris Doctor degree from the American College of Law in Orange County. Younge has worked as a lawyer and law professor—having taught entertainment law at his alma mater. Early in his career, Younge worked for the legal department of MTV.

== Music career ==
Younge edits and scores films. He played bass and keyboards in a band during the late 1990s, and began composing after sampling records with an MPC. He quickly learned to play several instruments and experimented with analog recordings which resulted in the Italian influenced Venice Dawn, which he released on EP. In 2009, his soundtrack for the film Black Dynamite was released on the Wax Poetics label. In 2011, Younge revived and expanded Venice Dawn into a longer work called Something about April. In 2013, he released Adrian Younge Presents the Delfonics with William Hart of the Delfonics and Twelve Reasons to Die with Ghostface Killah. Younge also operates a vinyl record store in Los Angeles called Artform Studio.

Younge, along with Ali Shaheed Muhammad of A Tribe Called Quest, produced Kendrick Lamar's "untitled 06" song featuring CeeLo Green, which was later reworked into the track "Questions" from the 2018 album The Midnight Hour. Younge and Ali also co-founded the Jazz Is Dead record label in 2017.

Younge also released Something About April II (2016) and Something About April III (2025).

In 2021, Younge released the album The American Negro, as well as produced the podcast "Invisible Blackness". Both projects were launched during Black History Month and each seeks to highlight the systemic racism that African Americans have endured in the United States and the psychological toll that results. The podcast features speakers such as Chuck D, Ladybug Mecca, Keyon Harrold, and Michael Jai White.

== Discography ==
=== Studio albums ===
- Something about April (2011)
- Adrian Younge Presents the Delfonics (with William Hart; 2013)
- Something About April II (2016)
- The Electronique Void: Black Noise (with Jack Waterson; 2016)
- Voices of Gemma (with Rebecca Engelhart and Brooke deRosa; 2018)
- The Midnight Hour (with Ali Shaheed Muhammad; 2018)
- Jack Waterson (with Jack Waterson; 2019)
- Jazz Is Dead 001 (with Ali Shaheed Muhammad; 2020)
- Roy Ayres JID002 (with Roy Ayers and Ali Shaheed Muhammad; 2020)
- Marcos Valle JID003 (with Marcos Valle and Ali Shaheed Muhammad; 2020)
- Azymuth JID004 (with Azymuth and Ali Shaheed Muhammad; 2020)
- Doug Carn JID005 (with Doug Carn and Ali Shaheed Muhammad; 2020)
- The American Negro (2021)
- Gary Bartz JID006 (with Gary Bartz and Ali Shaheed Muhammad; 2021)
- João Donato JID007 (with João Donato and Ali Shaheed Muhammad; 2021)
- Brian Jackson JID008 (with Brian Jackson and Ali Shaheed Muhammad; 2021)
- Instrumentals JID009 (with Ali Shaheed Muhammad; 2021)
- Remixes JID010 (2021)
- Jazz Is Dead 011 (with Ali Shaheed Muhammad; 2022)
- Jean Carne JID012 (with Jean Carne and Ali Shaheed Muhammad; 2022)
- Katalyst JID013 (with Katalyst and Ali Shaheed Muhammad; 2022)
- Henry Franklin JID014 (with Henry Franklin and Ali Shaheed Muhammad; 2022)
- Garrett Saracho JID015 (with Garrett Saracho and Ali Shaheed Muhammad; 2022)
- Phil Ranelin & Wendel Harrison JID016 (with Phil Ranelin, Wendell Harrison, and Ali Shaheed Muhammad; 2023)
- Lonnie Liston Smith JID017 (with Lonnie Liston Smith and Ali Shaheed Muhammad; 2023)
- Tony Allen JID018 (with Tony Allen; 2023)
- Instrumentals JID019 (with Ali Shaheed Muhammad; 2023)
- Remixes JID020 (with Ali Shaheed Muhammad; 2023)
- Samantha e Adrian (with Samantha Schmütz; 2025)
- Something About April III (2025)
- Jazz Is Dead 025 (with Carlos Dafé; 2025)
- Younge (2026)
- Jazz Is Dead 027: (with Joyce & Tutty Moreno; 2026)

=== Live albums ===
- Live at Linear Labs (with Ali Shaheed Muhammad, Jack Waterson, David Henderson, Shai Golan, Zach Ramacier, Korina Davis, Sarah Tarablus, Loren Odon, and Angela Muñoz, as The Midnight Hour; 2019)

=== Compilation albums ===
- Linear Labs: São Paulo (2024)

=== Mixes ===
- Dark Soul Mix (2012)

=== Score albums ===
- Black Dynamite (2009)
- Luke Cage (with Ali Shaheed Muhammad; 2016)
- Luke Cage: Season 2 (with Ali Shaheed Muhammad; 2018)
- Run This Town (with Ali Shaheed Muhammad; 2020)
- Reasonable Doubt (with Ali Shaheed Muhammad; 2022)
- Cross (with Ali Shaheed Muhammad; 2024)

=== EPs ===
- Venice Dawn EP (2000)
- Produced by Adrian Younge (2019)

=== Production ===
- Ab-Soul – "Passion" from Long Term 2 (2010)
- Big Remo – "Don't Matter (Over There)" from Entrapment (2010)
- Phil Ade – "You're the One" from A Different World Mixtape (2011)
- Meyhem Lauren – "Mandated Participants" from Mandatory Brunch Meetings (2012)
- Barbarfiverek – "Feszultseg" from Mennydorges (2012)
- Ghostface Killah – Twelve Reasons to Die (2013)
- Jay-Z – "Picasso Baby" and "Heaven" from Magna Carta Holy Grail (2013)
- Prodigy – "The One" from Albert Einstein (2013)
- Talib Kweli – "Demonology" from Gravitas (2013)
- Souls of Mischief – There Is Only Now (2014)
- DJ Premier and Royce da 5'9" – "PRhyme" from PRhyme (2014)
- Wu-Tang Clan – "Crushed Egos" and "Ruckus in B Minor" from A Better Tomorrow (2014)
- Common – "7 Deadly Sins" and "Out on Bond" from Nobody's Smiling (2014)
- Army of the Pharaohs – "Visual Camouflage" from In Death Reborn (2014)
- Ghostface Killah – Twelve Reasons to Die II (2015)
- Bilal – In Another Life (2015)
- Gallant – "Skipping Stones" from Ology (2015)
- Bambu – "Prey'er" from Prey for the Devil (2016)
- Kendrick Lamar – "untitled 06 | 06.30.2014" from Untitled Unmastered (2016)
- Schoolboy Q – "John Muir" from Blank Face LP (2016)
- Dave East – "Keisha" from Kairi Chanel (2016)
- Lloyd Banks – "Parade" from Halloween Havoc 3 (2016)
- Fabolous and Jadakiss – "I Pray" from Friday on Elm Street (2017)
- Fat Joe and Remy Ma – "Swear to God" from Plata O Plomo (2017)
- Mila J – "People Watchin'" from September 2018 (2018)
- Skyzoo – "Love Is Love" from In Celebration of Us (2018)

=== Remixes ===
- Lyrics Born – "I Changed My Mind" from Now Look What You've Done, Lyrics Born! Greatest Hits (2016)
- DJ Shadow – "Changeling II" from Endtroducing..... 20th anniversary edition (2016)
