= F.U. Don't Take It Personal =

Studio album by Fu-Schnickens
- Released: February 25, 1992
- Recorded: 1991
- Studio: Battery Studios (New York)
- Genre: Hip hop
- Length: 43:12
- Label: Jive
- Producer: A Tribe Called Quest; Fu-Schnickens; Lyvio G.; Dres

Fu-Schnickens chronology
F.U. Don't Take It Personal (1992)	Nervous Breakdown (1994)

Singles from F.U. Don't Take It Personal
- 1. "Ring the Alarm" Released: November 4, 1991; 2. "La Schmoove" Released: April 24, 1992; 3. "True Fuschnick" Released: August 14, 1992

F.U. Don't Take It Personal is the debut studio album from American hip hop group Fu-Schnickens, released February 25, 1992, on Jive Records. The recording sessions took place at Battery Studios in New York, New York.

The album peaked at number sixty-four on the Billboard 200 chart. By late 1994, it was certified gold by the RIAA, for shipping 500,000 copies in the United States.

== Background ==
The album was recorded at Battery Studios in New York, New York.

== Commercial performance ==
F.U. Don't Take It Personal peaked at sixty-four on the U.S. Billboard 200 and reached the thirteenth spot on the R&B Albums chart. The album was certified gold in 1994.

== Critical reception ==
Professional ratings
Review scores
Source	Rating
AllMusic	4.5/5 stars
Blender	5/5 stars
Chicago Tribune	3/4 stars
NME	6/10
RapReviews	8/10
The Source	3.5/5 stars
The Village Voice	A−

In The Village Voice, Robert Christgau praised Fu-Schnickens' ideas and illustratory rhymes, calling the group "rappers whose visions of fun, agape, and aural conquest remain open-ended, playful, and, face it, silly". The Kitchener-Waterloo Record wrote that the production "tends to muddy things to the extent that the group's grating, high-speed raps are almost lost."

Stanton Swihart at AllMusic wrote in retrospect that "although their fashion sense (kung fu outfits on the cover) and taste in influences may have initially painted them as a novelty, their approach to music was straight serious on this debut album, and it shows."

== Track listing ==
No.	Title	Writer(s)	Producer(s)	Length
1.	"True Fuschnick"	Ali Shaheed Muhammad; Joseph Jones; Lennox Maturine; Roderick Roachford	A Tribe Called Quest	4:07
2.	"Movie Scene"	Jones; Maturine; Roachford	Fu-Schnickens	4:01
3.	"Ring the Alarm"	Lyvio Gay; Jones; Maturine; Roachford	Lyvio G.	3:50
4.	"Back Off"	Gay; Jones; Maturine; Roachford	Fu-Schnickens; Lyvio G.	4:14
5.	"Heavenly Father"	Muhammad; Jones; Maturine; Roachford	A Tribe Called Quest	4:37
6.	"La Schmoove" (feat. Phife Dawg)	Muhammad; Jones; Maturine; Roachford; Malik Taylor	A Tribe Called Quest	4:58
7.	"Props"	Jones; Maturine; Roachford	Fu-Schnickens	5:36
8.	"Generals"	Gay; Jones; Maturine; Roachford	Lyvio G.	3:44
9.	"Check It Out" (feat. Dres)	Andres Vargas-Titus; Jones; Maturine; Roachford; Ernest McCor; Robert Humbert; Vincent Bramble; L. Robinson	Dres	4:54
10.	"Bebo"	Gay; Jones; Maturine; Roachford	Fu-Schnickens; Lyvio G.	3:11

== Charts ==
=== Weekly charts ===
Chart (1992)	Peak position
U.S. Billboard 200	64
U.S. Heatseekers	1
U.S. R&B Albums	13

== Certifications ==
Region	Certification	Certified units/sales
United States (RIAA)	Gold	500,000^{^}
^{^} Shipments figures based on certification alone.

== Personnel ==
- assistant engineering – Charlie Allen, Pete Christensen, Eric Gast, Gerard Julien, Tim Latham
- engineering – Barbera Aimes, Anthony Saunders
- mixing – Ali Shaheed Muhammad, Bob Power, Chris Trevett
- production – A Tribe Called Quest, Fu-Schnickens, Lyvio G.
- vocals (background) – Debbie Lewis Aimes, Kia Jeffries, Hirami Kuroimo, Sally Ries
