= What's Up Doc? (Can We Rock) =

Single by Fu-Schnickens and Shaquille O'Neal

from the album Nervous Breakdown and Shaq Diesel
- Released: June 8, 1993
- Recorded: 1992
- Studio: Unique Recording Studios, New York City
- Genre: Hip hop
- Length: 3:57
- Label: Jive
- Songwriters: Roderick Roachford, Joe Jones, Lennox Maturine, Shaquille O'Neal, Kevin McKenzie
- Producer: K-Cut

Fu-Schnickens singles chronology
"True Fuschnick" (1992)	"What's Up Doc? (Can We Rock)" (1993)	"Breakdown" (1994)

Music video
- "What's Up Doc? (Can We Rock)" on YouTube

"What's Up Doc? (Can We Rock)" is the lead single from American hip-hop trio Fu-Schnickens' second studio album, Nervous Breakdown (1994). The song featured NBA star Shaquille O'Neal and was produced by Main Source member K-Cut. The song was a top-40 hit in 1993 and was certified gold by the RIAA for sales of 500,000 copies.

== Background ==
Released in the summer of 1993, "What's Up Doc? (Can We Rock)" became a top-40 hit, peaking at No. 35 and 39 on the US Cash Box Top 100 and Billboard Hot 100 charts. The song had previously been simply titled "What's Up Doc?" and featured a sample of Bugs Bunny saying the title, but because the group could not get sample clearance from Warner Bros., this version was not released. Meanwhile, NBA player Shaquille O'Neal had become a media sensation in his first season. In many interviews, he talked about his love of hip hop music and stated that Fu-Schnickens were his favorite group. This prompted the group to contact O'Neal for a collaboration. O'Neal recorded a verse that was added to the song, along with the spoken line "What's up, doc?" to replace the Bugs Bunny sample. Although the group had not yet completed recording their album Nervous Breakdown, the song was quickly released as a single to capitalize on O'Neal's popularity. The single was a Top 40 hit in the summer of 1993, briefly propelling the group into the mainstream. The song first appeared on an album recorded by O'Neal, Shaq Diesel. Nervous Breakdown was finally released in October 1994, over a year after the single's release.

== Music video ==
The music video was filmed underneath the Manhattan Bridge, on the Manhattan side. The clip was directed by Sarah Pirozek.

== Live performances ==
Shaq performed the song live with Fu-Schnickens on The Arsenio Hall Show on December 2, 1992.

== Track listing ==
1. "What's up Doc? (Can We Rock)" (LP Version)- 3:57
2. "What's up Doc? (Can We Rock)" (K-Cut's Mad Master Remix)- 4:04
3. "What's up Doc? (Can We Rock)" (K-Cut's Fat Trac Remix)- 3:59
4. "True Fuschnick" (Phase 5 Euro-Dub Remix)- 4:19
5. "Heavenly Father" (Tempted 2 Touch Murder Mix)- 5:10
6. "What's Up Doc? (Can We Rock)"- 3:56

== Charts ==
Chart (1993)	Peak position
Australia (ARIA)	59
US Billboard Hot 100	39
US Hot R&B/Hip-Hop Singles & Tracks (Billboard)	56
US Hot Rap Singles (Billboard)	22
US Hot Dance Music/Maxi-Singles Sales (Billboard)	16
US Dance Music/Club Play Singles (Billboard)	26
US Cash Box Top 100	35

== Certifications ==
Region	Certification	Certified units/sales
United States (RIAA)	Gold	500,000^{^}
^{^} Shipments figures based on certification alone.
