= Breakdown (Fu-Schnickens song) =

Single by Fu-Schnickens

from the album Nervous Breakdown
- B-side: "Sneakin' Up on Ya"
- Released: 1994
- Genre: Comedy rap
- Length: 4:10
- Label: Jive
- Songwriter(s): Roger Troutman; Larry Troutman; Lennox Maturine; Roderick Roachford; Rod Kirkpatrick
- Producer(s): Rod Kirkpatrick

Fu-Schnickens singles chronology
"What's Up Doc? (Can We Rock)" (1993)	"Breakdown" (1994)	"Sum Dum Munkey" (1994)

"Breakdown" is a song performed by American hip hop group Fu-Schnickens. It is the opening track on their second studio album Nervous Breakdown and was issued as the album's second single. The song samples "Dance Floor" by Zapp and "Theme from the Black Hole" by Parliament. It was the group's last song to chart on the Billboard Hot 100, peaking at No. 67 in 1994.

== Music video ==
The official music video for the song was directed by Marcus Nispel.

== Chart positions ==
Chart (1994)	Peak position
US Billboard Hot 100	67
US Hot Dance Music/Maxi-Singles Sales (Billboard)	10
US Hot R&B/Hip-Hop Singles & Tracks (Billboard)	38
US Hot Rap Singles (Billboard)	7
