= Luke Cage (soundtrack) =

Soundtrack album by Adrian Younge and Ali Shaheed Muhammad
- Released: October 7, 2016
- Genres: Hip hop; jazz
- Length: 1:35:09
- Labels: Hollywood; Marvel Music
- Producers: Adrian Younge; Ali Shaheed Muhammad

Singles from Luke Cage
- 1. "Bulletproof Love (featuring Method Man)" Released: October 3, 2016

Luke Cage (Original Soundtrack Album) is the soundtrack album to the 2016 first season of the streaming television series Luke Cage, featuring music composed by Adrian Younge and Ali Shaheed Muhammad. The soundtrack was released on October 7, 2016, digitally and with a vinyl release by Mondo.

Younge and Muhammad were asked to join the series by showrunner Cheo Hodari Coker, and strove to write a score inspired by hip hop. They were given a full orchestra to record the score with. In addition to their music, the soundtrack includes songs from various artists that gave onscreen performances during the season, including the original song "Bulletproof Love" featuring Method Man, which was also released before the album as a single.

== Background ==
In April 2016, Luke Cage showrunner Cheo Hodari Coker revealed that Adrian Younge and Ali Shaheed Muhammad were composing the series' score, describing it as "a '90s hip-hop vibe" with "a lot of different musical appearances". Younge and Muhammad spotted each episode together with the episode's director, then went off and worked on certain cues each, though the two did work on some cues together. Marvel Television, Netflix, and ABC were extremely supportive of Younge and Muhammad's artistic process after hearing their first work for the series (the duo started by composing the bookending music of the second episode), asking them to "push" the sound of the score as far as they could, and allowing them the use of a full, 30-piece orchestra for recording. The score was orchestrated and conducted by Miguel Atwood-Ferguson, and recorded and mixed at Raphael Saadiq's studio.

Marvel did criticize the initial theme music that Younge and Muhammad wrote for the series, which was inspired by the "British library music" of Alan Tew. Coker wanted to use the music, but the studio felt that it was too slow to play over the opening credits. They eventually agreed to use the music for the closing credits of each episode, and wrote a piece closer to "classic" theme music for the opening. They still made this "more funky, and kind of crazy" compared to traditional themes, and Marvel praised it. For Younge, it was important that the music for the series be recorded using analog technologies, comparing it to the music of Marvin Gaye and Stevie Wonder where "you don't like it just because it's composed well. You don't like it just because they have great voices. You like it because of the way it makes you feel, sonically ... the deep, organic, soulful sound waves in it." He felt that music produced digitally could not replicate this quality and would be "cutting corners".

The series features onscreen performances by various artists, which Coker wanted to use to help capture the vibe of the neighborhood. Several of these songs are included on the soundtrack album, including the single "Bulletproof Love", featuring Method Man, an original rap song featured in the episode "Soliloquy of Chaos". The track was arranged by Younge and Muhammad, and includes much of the socio-political commentary that showrunner Cheo Hodari Coker wished to convey throughout the series. The track "Requiem for Phife", which is used in one of the biggest scenes of the series, was written by Muhammad as a tribute to his fellow A Tribe Called Quest member Malik "Phife Dawg" Taylor, who died while Muhammad was working on the score.

== Track listing ==
All music by Adrian Younge and Ali Shaheed Muhammad, except where noted.

Disc 1
No.	Title	Length
1.	"Good Man" (by Raphael Saadiq)	3:45
2.	"Mesmerized" (by Faith Evans)	4:07
3.	"Ain't It a Sin" (by Charles Bradley)	3:50
4.	"Stop And Look (And You Have Found Love)" (by Adrian Younge and The Delfonics)	2:46
5.	"100 Days, 100 Nights" (by Sharon Jones & The Dap-Kings)	3:43
6.	"Diamondback Arrives"	2:52
7.	"Final Battle – Part 1"	1:44
8.	"In the Wind"	2:22
9.	"Diamondback's Trap"	1:42
10.	"Blue Fusion"	2:41
11.	"Final Battle – Part 2"	2:14
12.	"I'm Luke Cage"	1:17
13.	"Street Cleaning"	2:13
14.	"The Ambush"	2:05
15.	"End Theme"	1:41
16.	"Coffee at Midnight"	1:31
17.	"Red-Handedly Blameless"	2:57
18.	"Always Forward Pops"	1:19
19.	"Unveil the Bride"	1:46
20.	"Shameek's Death"	2:19

Disc 2
No.	Title	Length
21.	"The Plan"	1:48
22.	"Requiem for Phife"	3:43
23.	"We Had Coffee"	0:55
24.	"Pops Is Gone"	2:48
25.	"Theme"	1:09
26.	"Greed Becomes Me"	0:35
27.	"Bulletproof Love" (featuring Method Man)	2:12
28.	"Microphone Check Five'O"	0:56
29.	"Luke's Freedom"	4:52
30.	"Uptown Claire"	0:43
31.	"Shades Beware"	0:44
32.	"Misty Resolute"	1:28
33.	"Fresh Air"	1:24
34.	"Kinda Strong"	0:37
35.	"Big Man Little Jacket"	1:06
36.	"Scarfe's Dying"	2:17
37.	"Claire's Wisdom"	1:13
38.	"Gun Threat"	2:40
39.	"Bad Love"	1:16
40.	"Finding Chico"	1:22
41.	"I Am Carl Lucas"	1:04
42.	"Crispus Attucks"	0:47
43.	"Hideout"	2:27
44.	"Cuban Coffee"	0:44
45.	"Like a Brother"	1:24
46.	"Cottonmouth's Clamp"	1:38
47.	"Survival"	1:01
48.	"Cottonmouth Theme"	0:19
49.	"Luke Cops"	1:12
50.	"Crushin' On Reva"	1:07
51.	"Beloved Reva"	1:24

== Release ==
In July 2016, Coker revealed plans for a vinyl soundtrack album for the series, to be produced by Younge and Muhammad. On September 30, "Bulletproof Love" was released digitally as a single alongside the release of the television series on Netflix. On October 6, Younge and Muhammad held a concert at the Theatre at Ace Hotel, Los Angeles, with a 40-piece orchestra conducted by Miguel Atwood-Ferguson performing their score for the series. Hosted by Russell Peters and Wayne Brady, the event also featured an opening DJ set by No I.D. Younge and Muhammad had wanted to perform the score live since they first began working on the project, and the producers agreed after hearing the completed music.

The full soundtrack album was released on October 7, digitally and on vinyl. The vinyl release from Mondo was pressed on "Power Man Yellow" colored vinyl, with collectible artwork by Matthew Woodson. On October 8, Mondo announced that its entire initial pressing of the release had already been sold out, to be shipped at the end of the month. Further orders would begin shipping in late November. Additionally, Mondo will release posters of Woodson's art on November 10, screen prints "featuring a layer of spot varnish to bring different elements of the illustration to life."
