= Ring the Alarm (Fu-Schnickens song) =

Single by Fu-Schnickens

from the album F.U. Don't Take It Personal
- Released: November 4, 1991
- Genre: Hip hop, East Coast hip hop
- Length: 3:50
- Label: Jive
- Songwriters: Lyvio G., J. Jones, L. Maturine, R. Roachford
- Producer: Lyvio G.

Fu-Schnickens singles chronology
"Ring the Alarm" (1991)	"La Schmoove" (1992)

"Ring the Alarm" is the debut single by American hip hop group Fu-Schnickens, released in November 1991. It is from the group's 1992 debut album F.U. Don't Take It Personal. The song reached No. 6 on the US Billboard Hot Rap Songs chart.

== Track listing ==
12", 33 1/3 RPM, CD, vinyl

1. "Ring the Alarm" (LP Version) - 3:50
2. "Ring the Alarm" (Steely & Clevie Remix) - 3:55
3. "Ring the Alarm" (Steely & Clevie Extended Mix) - 4:54
4. "Ring the Alarm" (LP Instrumental) - 3:50

== Personnel ==
Information taken from Discogs.

- additional production – Steely & Clevie
- direction – Philip Pabon
- engineering – Anthony Saunders
- guitar – Danny Browne
- management – Philip Pabon
- mastering – Tom Coyne
- mix engineering – Chris Trevett
- photography – Michael Benabib
- production – Lyvio G.
- remixing – Steely & Clevie
- writing – Lyvio G., J. Jones, L. Maturine, R. Roachford

== Chart performance ==
Chart (1992)	Peak position
U.S. Hot Rap Singles	6
