= Cheryl Boyce Taylor =

Trinidadian poet, artist, and theatre performer

- Born: Cheryl Allison Boyce-Taylor; 6 December 1950 (age 75); Arima, Trinidad and Tobago
- Education: City College of New York; Stonecoast: The University of Southern Maine; Fordham University
- Children: Malik Izaak Taylor aka Phife Dawg
- Website: cherylboycetaylor.net

Cheryl Allison Boyce-Taylor (born 6 December 1950) is a Trinidadian poet, teaching artist, and theatre performer who lives in Brooklyn, New York. Boyce-Taylor has published several full-length poetry monographs, including early works As A Woman I Laugh and Cry: Poems, Birthsounds, Rhythms and Other Contractions; five collections of poetry; and an award-winning verse memoir dedicated to her son.

She is the mother of late Trinidadian-American hip-hop artiste Malik Izaak Taylor aka Phife Dawg of A Tribe Called Quest.

== Biography ==
=== Early years and education ===
Cheryl Boyce-Taylor was born in Arima, Trinidad and Tobago on 6 December 1950. Her early years were spent honing a love for poetry in the footsteps of her mother who was a regular winner of poetry recitation contests during her own school days. In primary school, Boyce-Taylor recalls learning Shelley, Keats, and Shakespeare, but it was through the political and social musings of calypsonians and through the sound of the steel pan that she realized the power of poetry to reflect her life.

At the age of 13, Boyce-Taylor moved to the St Albans neighborhood of Queens, New York, and attended the Bronx-Manhattan Seventh Day Adventist School in the Bronx.

After graduation, she worked as a file clerk and completed an undergraduate degree at City College of New York in Theatre. She then earned a master of Fine Art degree in Poetry from Stonecoast: The University of Southern Maine, and a Masters of Social Work from Fordham University.

== Works ==
Cheryl Boyce-Taylor is the author of five poetry collections, with another scheduled for 2022.

She co-founded an all-lesbian women's performance group, the Stations Collective, which included Dorothy Randall Gray, Sapphire, Pamela Sneed, Storme Webber, and Hadley Mays, to perform Audre Lorde’s work in the late 1980s.

Boyce-Taylor founded the Calypso Muse Reading Series in 1994 and is the creator of the Glitter Pomegranate Performance Series.

Boyce-Taylor was a poetry judge for the New York Foundation for the Arts and the Astraea Lesbian Foundation for Justice, and has performed at the Brooklyn Academy of Music, Aaron Davis Hall, The Bowery Poetry Club, The African Poetry Theatre, Lincoln Center, and Celebrate Brooklyn! in Prospect Park. She frequently performed at Rikers Island. She also has facilitated poetry workshops for Cave Canem Foundation and Poets & Writers.

=== Honours and recognition ===
In 1994, Boyce-Taylor was the first Caribbean woman to present her work in Trinidadian dialect at the National Poetry Slam. She has toured the United States as a road poet with Lollapalooza and performed for Mamapolooza in New York City.

Boyce-Taylor's work has been commissioned by The Joyce Theater, and the National Endowment for the Arts for Ronald K. Brown: Evidence, A Dance Company. She is a recipient of the Partners in Writing Grant and served as Poet in Residence at the Caribbean Literary and Cultural Center in Brooklyn and as a VONA fellow.

=== Awards ===
- 2015: Barnes and Noble Writers for Writers Award
- 2018: Paterson Poetry Prize (finalist)
- 2022: The Audre Lorde Award for Lesbian Poetry by The Publishing Triangle
- 2023: Hurston/Wright Legacy Award for Poetry, We Are Not Wearing Helmets

== Archives ==
Boyce-Taylor's life papers and portfolio are held at the Schomburg Center for Research in Black Cultural Studies in Harlem, New York.

The Cheryl Boyce-Taylor papers, 1982–2014, partially document the artistic and personal life of poet, visual and teaching artist, Cheryl Boyce-Taylor. The collection contains biographical material, such as correspondence and interview transcripts;writing material, such as manuscripts, drafts; and printed matter, such as programs, flyers, and clippings.

== Personal life ==
In 1970, Boyce-Taylor married childhood friend Walt Taylor, whose family lived on the same street as hers in Arima, Trinidad. They had a son, Malik Isaac Taylor (rapper Phife Dawg of the rap group A Tribe Called Quest), who was born prematurely, and whose twin, Mikal, died only a few hours after birth. Cheryl and Walt later divorced.

Boyce-Taylor, who has been with her partner, Ceni, for more than two decades, has been open about her journey in becoming an out lesbian, which included the difficult time when she had to tell her husband.

Boyce-Taylor currently lives in Brooklyn, New York, with her long-time partner, Ceni.

== Bibliography ==
=== Poetry Collections ===
- Raw Air (Fly by Night Press, 2000), ISBN 0-9639585-7-7
- Night When Moon Follows (Long Shot Productions, 2000), ISBN 0-9654738-4-8
- Convincing the Body (Vintage Entity Press 2005), ISBN 0-9752987-1-2
- Arrival: Poems (TriQuarterly Northwestern University Press, 2017) - Finalist for the Paterson Poetry Prize. ISBN 0-8101-3514-0
- Mama Phife Represents (Haymarket Books, 2021) Winner of The Audre Lourde Award for Lesbian Poetry. ISBN 978-1-64259-404-1
- We Are Not Wearing Helmets: Poems (TriQuarterly Northwestern University Press, 2022), ISBN 0-8101-4423-9

=== Anthologies ===
- 1994: Aloud: Voices from the Nuyorican Poets Café, ISBN 978-0-8050-3257-4
- 1996: In Defense of Mumia, ISBN 978-0-86316-099-8
- 1997: Rhythms Poetry and Musings · Issues 1-2
- 1998: Poetry Nation: The North American Anthology of Fusion Poetry, ISBN 978-1-55065-112-6
- 2005: Bullets and Butterflies, ISBN 978-0-9746388-5-0
- 2009: Bum Rush The Page, ISBN 978-0-307-56564-8
- 2015: Prairie Schooner Volume 89 (2). 22 August 2015
