= La Schmoove =

Single by Fu-Schnickens featuring Phife Dawg

from the album F.U. Don't Take It Personal
- B-side: "Movie Scene"
- Released: April 24, 1992
- Genre: Hip hop, East Coast hip hop
- Length: 4:58
- Label: Jive
- Producer: A Tribe Called Quest

Fu-Schnickens featuring Phife Dawg singles chronology
"Ring the Alarm" (1991)	"La Schmoove" (1992)	"True Fuschnick" (1992)

Phife Dawg singles chronology
"La Schmoove" (1992)	"Ben Dova" (1999)

Music video
- "La Schmoove" on YouTube

"La Schmoove" is a song by American hip hop group Fu-Schnickens. The song, which features A Tribe Called Quest member Phife Dawg, was recorded for the group's debut album F.U. Don't Take It Personal and released as the second single from the album in April 1992. A portion of the song can be heard briefly in the film Falling Down.

== Track listing ==
12", Vinyl

1. "La Schmoove" (LP Version) - 4:58
2. "La Schmoove" (Remix) - 4:55
3. "La Schmoove" (LP Instrumental) - 4:58
4. "Movie Scene" (LP Version) - 4:01
5. "Movie Scene" (Stimulated Dummies Remix) - 4:18
6. "Movie Scene" (LP Instrumental) - 4:01

CD

1. "La Schmoove" (LP Version) - 4:58
2. "La Schmoove" (Remix) - 4:55
3. "La Schmoove" (LP Instrumental) - 4:58

== Personnel ==
Information taken from Discogs.

- mastering – Tom Coyne
- mixing – Ali Shaheed Muhammad, Bob Power
- production – A Tribe Called Quest, Fu-Schnickens
- remixing – Geeby Dajani, John Gamble, K-Cut, Dante Ross

== Charts ==
Chart (1992)	Peak position
U.S. Hot Dance Music/Maxi-Singles Sales	36
U.S. Hot R&B/Hip-Hop Singles & Tracks	30
U.S. Hot Rap Singles	3
