= Ali Shaheed Muhammad =

American DJ and producer (born 1970)

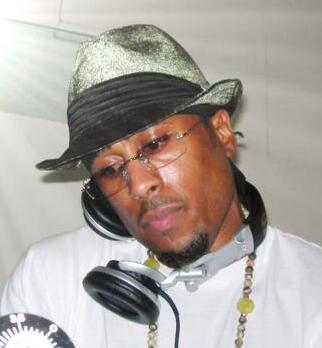
- Muhammad performing in 2008

Background information
- Also known as: Mr. Muhammad
- Born: August 11, 1970 (age 55); Brooklyn, New York City, U.S.
- Genres: East Coast hip hop; soul; jazz
- Occupations: Disc jockey; record producer; rapper; songwriter
- Years active: 1985–present
- Labels: Garden Seeker Productions; Jazz Is Dead
- Formerly of: A Tribe Called Quest; Lucy Pearl; The Ummah
- Website: alishaheed.com

Ali Shaheed Muhammad (born August 11, 1970) is an American hip hop DJ, record producer, rapper and bass guitarist, best known as a member of A Tribe Called Quest. With Q-Tip and Phife Dawg (and sometimes Jarobi White), the group released five studio albums from 1990 to 1998 before disbanding; their final album was released in 2016. He was also a member of the R&B group Lucy Pearl, and is known in recent years for his jazz collaborations with producer Adrian Younge.

== Early life ==
Muhammad was born in Brooklyn, New York City, and was raised in the Bedford–Stuyvesant neighborhood. He began to DJ at age eight, and began programming music at age 13. He befriended Q-Tip as a freshman at Murry Bergtraum High School in Manhattan, and in 1985, they began making demos together, using recording equipment provided by Muhammad's uncle. Shortly thereafter, Phife Dawg and Jarobi White joined the duo, forming the hip hop group A Tribe Called Quest. Muhammad is a Muslim.

== Career ==
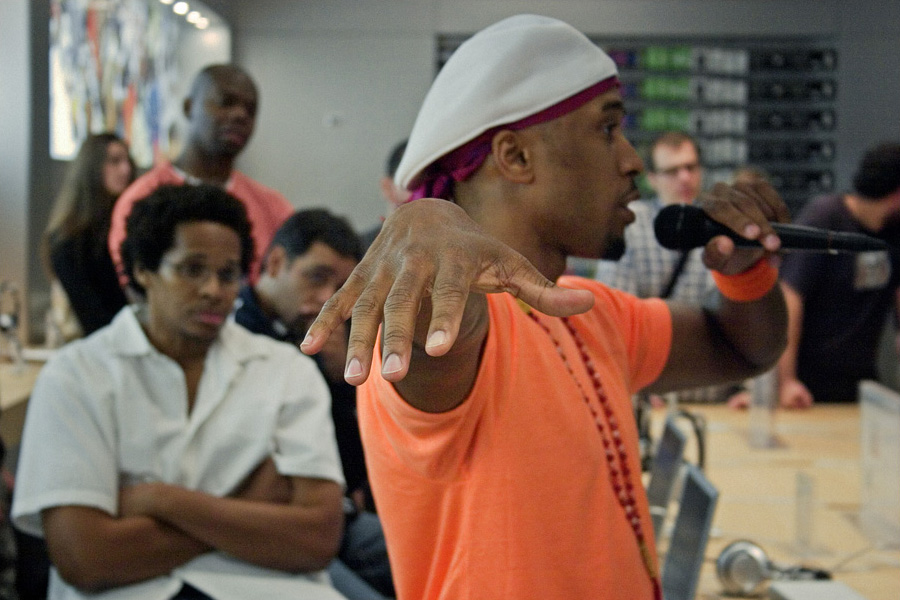
Muhammad speaking at Apple Fifth Avenue in New York City in 2006

Together with Jay Dee and Q-Tip, Muhammad formed the music-production collective the Ummah.

After A Tribe Called Quest disbanded, Muhammad formed the R&B supergroup Lucy Pearl with Dawn Robinson, formerly of En Vogue and Raphael Saadiq, formerly of Tony! Toni! Toné!, releasing one album in 2000. On October 12, 2004, he released his debut solo album, Shaheedullah and Stereotypes.

In 2013, Muhammad moved to Los Angeles to work with producer Adrian Younge on the Souls of Mischief album There Is Only Now, as the album's narrator. Since then Muhammad and Younge have collaborated to co-produce the soundtrack for both seasons of the Luke Cage TV series, and they have toured together since 2018 as the Midnight Hour, releasing an album by the same name.

In 2019, Muhammad contributed to Saadiq's fifth album, Jimmy Lee.

In 2020, Muhammad and Younge launched the Jazz Is Dead album series, in which the two of them collaborate with jazz musicians. Album partners in this series have included Roy Ayers, Marcos Valle, Doug Carn, Gary Bartz, João Donato, and the trio Azymuth. Muhammad is the main bass guitarist for the project.

In 2024, Muhammad was inducted into the Rock and Roll Hall of Fame, as a member of A Tribe Called Quest.

== Radio show ==
In 2013, Muhammad began co-hosting the Microphone Check radio show, which ran on NPR until 2016, and on Spotify until 2019.

== Discography ==
=== Studio albums ===
- Shaheedullah and Stereotypes (2004)

=== with Lucy Pearl ===
- Lucy Pearl (2000)

=== with Adrian Younge ===
- Luke Cage (Original Soundtrack Album) (2016)
- Luke Cage: Season 2 (Original Soundtrack Album) (2018)
- The Midnight Hour (as The Midnight Hour) (2018)
- Jazz Is Dead 001 (2020)
- Roy Ayers JID002 (2020)
- Marcos Valle JID003 (2020)
- Azymuth JID004 (2020)
- Doug Carn JID005 (2020)
- Gary Bartz JID006 (2021)
- João Donato JID007 (2021)
- Brian Jackson JID008 (2021)
- Instrumentals JID009 (2021)
- Remixes JID010 (2021)
- Jazz is Dead 011 (2022)
- Jean Carne JID012 (2022)
- Katalyst JID013 (2022)
- Henry Franklin JID014 (2022)
- Garret Saracho JID015 (2022)
- Phil Ranelin and Wendell Harrison JID016 (2023)
- Lonnie Liston Smith JID017 (2023)
- Tony Allen JID018 (2023)
- Instrumentals JID019 (2023)
- Remixes JID020 (2023)

=== Selected solo production credits ===
1991

==== A Tribe Called Quest - Check the Rhime 12" ====
- "Check the Rhime (Mr. Muhammad's Mix)"

1992

==== Fu-Schnickens - F.U. Don't Take It Personal ====
- "True Fuschnick"
- "Heavenly Father"
- "La Schmoove" (feat. Phife Dawg)

==== Fu-Schnickens - True Fuschnick 12" ====
- "True Fuschnick (Shaheed's Fix)"

==== Boogie Down Productions - We in There 12" ====
- "We in There (Remix)"

1993

==== Greg Osby - 3-D Lifestyles ====
- "Raise"
- "Hardcopy"
- "Flow to the Underculture"

==== Shaquille O'Neal - Shaq Diesel ====
- "Where Ya At?" (feat. Phife Dawg)

==== Young MC - What's the Flavor? ====
- "We Can Do This"
- "Foulin'"
- "Bob Your Head"
- "Open Up the Door (and Let Me In)"

1994

==== Gil Scott-Heron - Spirits ====
- "Don't Give Up"

==== Ice Cube - What Can I Do? 12" ====
- "What Can I Do (Eastside Mix)"

==== Simple E - Colouz Uv Sound ====
- "Neck Work"

==== Da Bush Babees - Ambushed ====
- "We Run Things (It's Like That)"

1995

==== Faith Evans - You Used to Love Me 12" ====
- "You Used to Love Me (Ali Mix)"

==== D'Angelo - Brown Sugar ====
- "Brown Sugar" {co-produced by D'Angelo}

==== Naughty by Nature - Feel Me Flow 12" ====
- "Feel Me Flow (Ali Shaheed Muhammad Mix)"

==== Stepchild - Hangin' Around (Sicka Gettin' Treated) 12" ====
- "Hangin' Around (Sicka Gettin' Treated) [Remix]"

1997

==== Jon B. - I Do (Watcha Say Boo) 12" ====
- "Cool Relax (Remix)"

1998

==== Various artists - Ride (soundtrack) ====
- "Never Say Goodbye" - Adriana Evans and Phife Dawg

1999

==== Angie Stone - Black Diamond ====
- "Bone 2 Pic (With U)"

==== Shola Ama - In Return ====
- "Lovely Affair"

==== Eric Benét - A Day in the Life ====
- "That's Just My Way"
- "Lamentation"
- "Why You Follow Me"

==== Scritti Politti - Tinseltown to the Boogiedown: The Variations ====
- "Tinseltown to the Boogiedown (Ali Shaheed Variation)"

==== Various artists - The PJs (soundtrack) ====
- "What I Am" - Sy Smith

==== Mos Def - Black on Both Sides ====
- "Got"

2000

==== Laurneá Wilkerson - II ====
- "Keep Your Head Up"
- "Groovin'"
- "She's Hurtin'"

2001

==== Angie Stone - Mahogany Soul ====
- "What U Dyin' For"

==== Toshinobu Kubota - Time to Share ====
- "Neva Satisfied"

===== 2013 =====
John Legend - Love in the Future

- "Wanna Be Loved"

==== The Weeknd - Starboy ====
- "Sidewalks" {produced with Bobby Raps & Doc McKinney}

== See also ==
- A Tribe Called Quest
- Lucy Pearl
- The Ummah
- Native Tongues
- Raphael Saadiq
- Chalmers Alford
- D'Angelo
- Fu-Schnickens
