= Jazz Is Dead (record label) =

American record label

- Founder: Adrian Younge, Ali Shaheed Muhammad
- Genre: groove, jazz
- Country of origin: United States
- Location: Los Angeles
- Official website: jazzisdead.com

Jazz Is Dead is a record label and live music project based in Los Angeles, founded by Adrian Younge and Ali Shaheed Muhammad. Muhammad is one of the co-founders of A Tribe Called Quest, and Younge has worked with the Wu-Tang Clan, among others. The trademark dates back to the first concert in 2017 and Younge's real frustration with ticket sales for his Midnight Hour show, but expresses the opposite of what he says the studio project is about: working with and paying homage to frequently-sampled jazz masters. The first CD, recorded at Linear Labs, was released in March 2020 and included the work of Roy Ayers, Marcos Valle, Azymuth, Doug Carn, Gary Bartz, João Donato, and Brian Jackson.

== Discography ==
Musicians listed are in addition to Ali Shaheed Muhammed and Adrian Younge.

Title	Artists	Year
JID001	Roy Ayers, Marcos Valle, Azymuth, Doug Carn, Gary Bartz, João Donato, and Brian Jackson	2020
JID002	Roy Ayers	2020
JID003	Marcos Valle	2020
JID004	Azymuth	2020
JID005	Doug Carn	2020
JID006	Gary Bartz	2021
JID007	João Donato	2021
JID008	Brian Jackson	2021
JID009	instrumental remixes from JID002, 003, 006, 007	2021
JID010	DJ Spinna, Georgia Anne Muldrow, Kaidi Tatham and Cut Chemist	2021
JID011	Jean Carne, Henry Franklin, Garret Saracho, Tony Allen, Lonnie Liston Smith, Phil Ranelin and Wendell Harrison, and Katalyst (5)	2022
JID012	Jean Carne	2022
JID013	Katalyst	2022
JID014	Henry Franklin	2022
JID015	Garret Saracho	2022
JID016	Phil Ranelin and Wendell Harrison	2023
JID017	Lonnie Liston Smith	2023
JID018	Tony Allen	2023
JID019	instrumentals	2023
JID020	remixes	2023
JID021	The Midnight Hour, Dom Salvador, Carlos Dafé, Ebo Taylor, Antônio Carlos & Jocáfi, Joyce, Tutty Moreno, Hyldon	2024
JID022	Ebo Taylor	2025
JID023	Hyldon	2025
JID024	Dom Salvador	2025
JID025	Carlos Dafé	2025
JID026	Antonio Carlos & Jocafi	2026
JID027	Joyce e Tutty Moreno	2026
