= Phife Dawg =

American rapper (1970–2016)

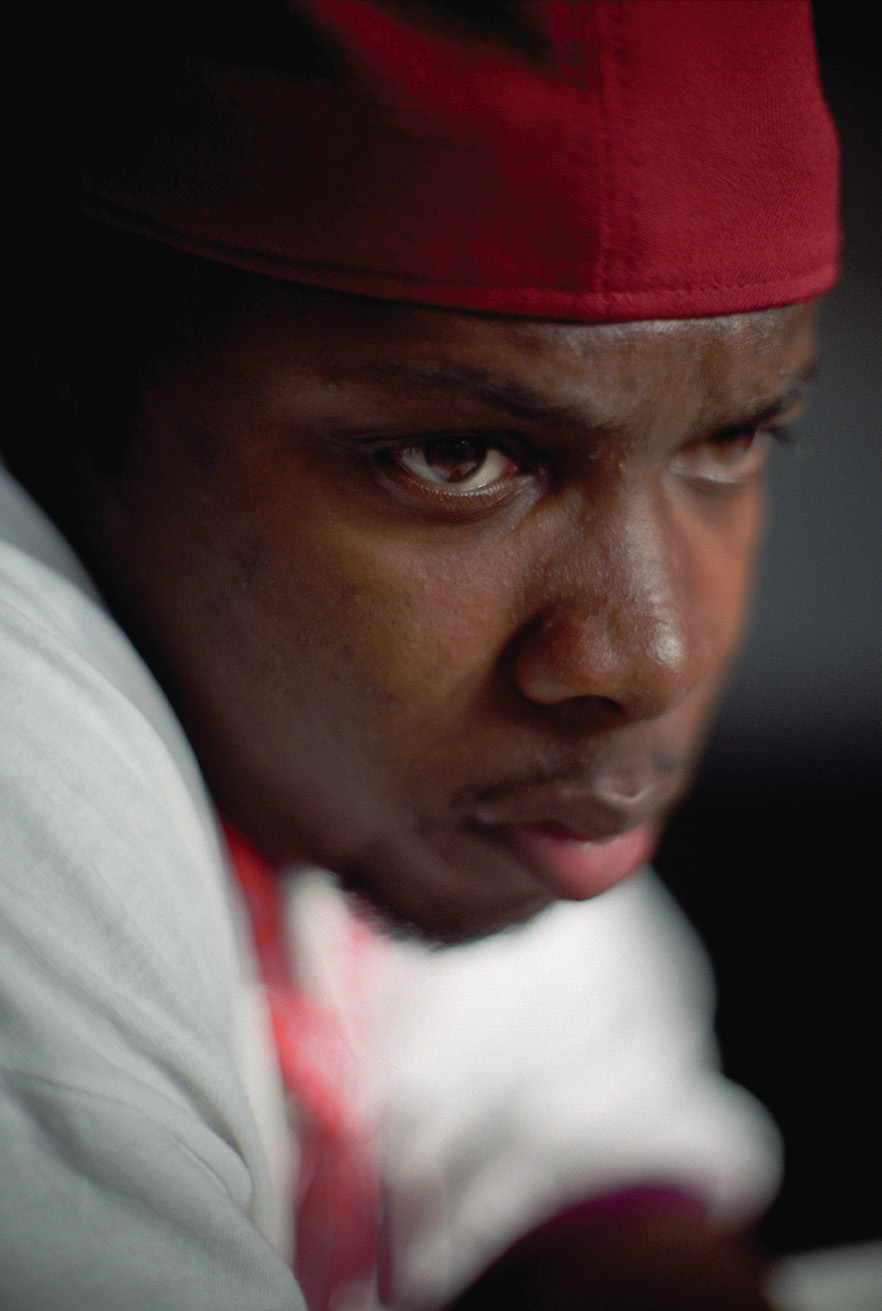
- Phife Dawg in 1999

Background information
- Also known as: Phife; Phife Diggy; The Phifer; The Five Foot Assassin
- Born: Malik Izaak Taylor; November 20, 1970; Queens, New York City, U.S.
- Died: March 22, 2016 (aged 45) Oakley, California, U.S.
- Genre: East Coast hip hop
- Occupations: Rapper; songwriter
- Years active: 1985–2016
- Labels: Jive; Groove Attack
- Formerly of: A Tribe Called Quest

Malik Izaak Taylor (November 20, 1970 – March 22, 2016), known professionally as Phife Dawg (or simply Phife), was an American rapper and a member of the group A Tribe Called Quest with Q-Tip and Ali Shaheed Muhammad (and for a short time Jarobi White). He was also known as the "Five-Foot Assassin" and the "Five-Footer", because he stood at 5 feet 3 inches (1.60 m).

== Early life ==
Phife Dawg was born Malik Izaak Taylor on November 20, 1970, in Queens, New York City, the son of Trinidadian immigrant parents Cheryl Boyce-Taylor, a poet, and Walt Taylor. His mother settled in the St. Albans neighborhood of Queens when she was 13 years old, and Phife Dawg was raised in the same neighborhood. Born prematurely, his twin brother Mikal died shortly after birth. He was a cousin of writer Zinzi Clemmons.

He first met his friend Q-Tip at the age of two. At nine years old, Phife Dawg suggested that they should rap, after hearing "Rapper's Delight" by the Sugarhill Gang for the first time. He attended Pine Forge Academy, a Seventh-day Adventist boarding school near Philadelphia, for his freshman year of high school, later transferring to Springfield Gardens High School in Queens.

== Career ==
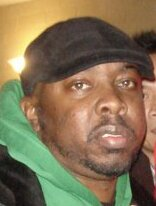
Phife Dawg in 2012

Phife Dawg formed A Tribe Called Quest, then simply named Quest, with Q-Tip and DJ Ali Shaheed Muhammad in 1985; the group was later expanded with the addition of Jarobi White. A Tribe Called Quest were closely associated with fellow hip-hop acts De La Soul and Jungle Brothers, with the groups collectively known as the Native Tongues. A Tribe Called Quest was initially offered a demo deal by Geffen Records in 1989 but signed with Jive Records to release its 1990 début People's Instinctive Travels and the Paths of Rhythm.

Phife Dawg's contributions to the group increased on its second album, 1991's The Low End Theory, which featured Phife rapping about social and political issues; the record has since been acclaimed by critics and musicians. The group released three more albums that decade—Midnight Marauders in 1993, Beats, Rhymes and Life in 1996, and The Love Movement in 1998—before disbanding as a result of conflict both with their record label and internally. The group's troubles, especially the sometimes tense relationship between Phife and Q-Tip, were featured in the 2011 documentary Beats, Rhymes & Life: The Travels of A Tribe Called Quest, directed by Michael Rapaport.

Phife also performed with other artists. He was featured on the Fu-Schnickens song "La Schmoove", Diamond D's "Painz & Strife" with Pete Rock, and Chi-Ali's "Let the Horns Blow" with Dres, Al' Tariq and Trugoy. In 2000, he released his debut solo album, Ventilation: Da LP. In 2013, it was reported that Phife was working on another solo album, MUTTYmorPHosis. A single, "Sole Men," was released one day after Phife's death (March 23, 2016) along with a posthumously released video. Another single, "Nutshell", was released online in April 2016 along with a posthumously released video.

On November 13, 2015, A Tribe Called Quest reunited for a performance on The Tonight Show Starring Jimmy Fallon in commemoration of the 25th anniversary of People's Instinctive Travels and the Paths of Rhythm. That night, Phife and Q-Tip decided to put aside their differences and record a new group album, We Got It from Here... Thank You 4 Your Service, in secrecy. Phife spent four months working on the album before his death; it was completed by the surviving members and released on November 11, 2016. In February 2017, it was announced that Phife's second studio album would be released later in the year. The single "Wanna Dance" was released that month and features Dwele and Mike City.

Phife Dawg's second solo album, Forever, was released on March 22, 2022, the sixth anniversary of his death.

== Personal life and death ==
Taylor was married to Deisha Head-Taylor. He was a fan of the New York Knicks, and was a playable character in the video games NBA 2K7 and NBA 2K9.

=== Illness and death ===
Taylor was diagnosed with diabetes in 1990. Conflicting reports indicated it as type 1, while other sources reported it as type 2. He described himself as a "funky diabetic" in the single "Oh My God" from A Tribe Called Quest's 1993 album Midnight Marauders. After the group disbanded, he continued playing live shows to help cover medical costs, and revealed in the 2011 documentary film Beats, Rhymes & Life that he was "just addicted to sugar ... it's really a sickness." In 2008, Taylor developed renal failure and received a kidney transplant from his wife, but it was unsuccessful, and by 2012 he again required a transplant.

On March 22, 2016, Taylor died at age 45 in his Oakley, California home due to complications of diabetes.

== Legacy ==
Taylor has been described as having had a "self-deprecating swagger," and his work with A Tribe Called Quest helped challenge the "macho posturing" of hip-hop music during the late 1980s and early 1990s. He has been cited as an influence on Kanye West, Jill Scott, The Roots, and Common. The 1991 album The Low End Theory is considered one of the greatest hip-hop albums of all time.

On November 19, 2016, a portion of Linden Boulevard, at the intersection of 192nd Street in St. Albans, was honorarily renamed "Malik 'Phife Dawg' Taylor Way." The location is significant as the site of the music video for "Check the Rhime."

In 2024, Phife Dawg was posthumously inducted into the Rock and Roll Hall of Fame, as a member of A Tribe Called Quest.

== Discography ==
=== Studio albums ===
- Ventilation: Da LP (2000)
- Forever (2022)

=== Guest appearances ===
List of guest appearances
Title	Year	Other performer(s)	Album
"La Schmoove"	1992	Fu-Schnickens	F.U. Don't Take It Personal
"Let the Horns Blow"	1992	Chi-Ali, Dres, Fashion, Trugoy the Dove	The Fabulous Chi-Ali
"Where Ya At?"	1993	Shaquille O'Neal	Shaq Diesel
"Giggin' on 'Em"	1993	Shaquille O'Neal	Shaq Diesel
"Intro-lude"	1994	TLC	CrazySexyCool
"Who Got the Funk"	1995	Science of Sound	Kaleidoscope Phonetics
"Artical"	1995	Whitey Don, Chip Fu	Artical (VLS)
"Game Day"	1996	Rodney Hampton	NFL Jams
"Painz & Strife"	1997	Diamond D, Pete Rock	Hatred, Passions and Infidelity
"Let Me Be the One (Ummah Remix)	1997	Mint Condition	Let Me Be the One (VLS)
"All I Do (Jay Dee's Shit! Mix)"	1997	Somethin' for the People	All I Do (CDS)
"Never Say Goodbye"	1998	Adriana Evans	Ride (soundtrack)
"Ghost Weed Skit 2"	2000	De La Soul	Art Official Intelligence: Mosaic Thump
"Phife's Speech"	2000	Ambivalence	Electric Treatment
"Committed"	2000	Ambivalence	Electric Treatment
"What's da Deal"	2000	Ambivalence	Electric Treatment
"In My Music (Dodge's Main Mix)"	2001	Al Jarreau	Tomorrow Today (Reissue)
"In My Music (Dodge's Melodic Mix)"	2001	Al Jarreau	Tomorrow Today (Reissue)
"Solo Movement"	2001	K-Mel	Reflexions Vol. 1
"Take You There"	2002	AK1200	Shoot to Kill
"It's Only Right"	2002	Next Evidence	Thrills
"You Know You Want It"	2003	Slick & Rose	Objects in the Mirror
"Nah Mean"	2003	will.i.am	Must B 21
"How It's Gonna Be"	2004	Truth Enola	6 O'Clock Straight
"How It's Gonna Be (Remix)"	2004	Truth Enola	Ten Past 6
"Scheming"	2010	Slum Village, Posdnuos	Villa Manifesto
"Tell the Whole City"	2011	Consequence	Movies on Demand 2
"They Say (Legendary Remix)"	2011	T3, Rapper Big Pooh	3illa Madness
"Dues n Donts"	2012	Oh No, José James	Ohnomite
"What Profit (Remix)"	2012	Dwele	—N/a
"Seek Well"	2013	CJ Fly, A La Sole	Thee Way Eye See It
"Push It Along"	2015	Slum Village	Yes!
"All Around the World"	2018	Black Eyed Peas, Ali Shaheed Muhammad, Posdnuos	Masters of the Sun Vol. 1
"No Place Like Home"	2019	Consequence	—N/a

== Filmography ==
=== Film ===
Year	Title	Role
1993	Who's the Man?	Gerald
1998	The Rugrats Movie	Newborn Baby
2011	Beats, Rhymes & Life: The Travels of A Tribe Called Quest	Himself

=== Video games ===
Year	Title	Role
2007	NBA 2K8	Himself
2017	NBA 2K18	Himself
