= Something about April =

Adrian Younge Presents Venice Dawn: Something About April

Studio album by Adrian Younge
- Released: 6 December 2011
- Genre: Psychedelic soul
- Length: 41:47
- Label: Wax Poetics Records
- Producer: Adrian Younge

Adrian Younge chronology
Black Dynamite (2009)	Adrian Younge Presents Venice Dawn: Something About April (2011)	Adrian Younge Presents The Delfonics (2013)

Adrian Younge Presents Venice Dawn: Something About April is a composition by American composer Adrian Younge. It was released on audio CD 6 December 2011 and on LP (WPR013) on 6 January 2012, both by Wax Poetics Records.

After finishing the soundtrack for Black Dynamite, Younge revisited his earlier treatment of the 2000 EP Venice Dawn, mixing its more baroque sound with the gritty soul of Black Dynamite. The new full-length release is "a heavy, dark mix of psychedelic soul and cinematic instrumentals with hip-hop aesthetics, touching on influences from Morricone to King Crimson, Portishead to The Flamingos, Wu-Tang Clan to Otis Redding."

== Track listing ==
No.	Title	Writer(s)	Length
1.	"Turn Down the Sound"	Adrian Younge	3:12
2.	"It's Me"	Younge	2:12
3.	"Anna May"	Younge; Byron Minns	3:21
4.	"Two Hearts Combine"	Younge	2:45
5.	"Thunderstrike"		1:56
6.	"Reverie"		2:24
7.	"First Step on the Moon"	Rebecca Jordan	3:08
8.	"Dusts of Gold"		1:53
9.	"Midnight Blue"	Jordan	3:36
10.	"Lovely Lady" (featuring Dennis Coffey)	Younge	3:52
11.	"Sound of a Man"	Younge	3:08
12.	"Sirens"		2:37
13.	"Mourning Melodies in Rhapsody"		2:38
14.	"Something About April"	Younge	5:05

Deluxe edition (bonus track)
No.	Title	Length
15.	"Niacin"	2:49

== Personnel ==
Credits are adapted from Allmusic.

- Adrian Younge – electric bass, chimes, clarinet, clavinet, drums, Fender Rhodes, flute, guitar, electric guitar, fuzz guitar, rhythm guitar, Hammond B3, Hammond organ, harpsichord, electric harpsichord, keyboards, percussion, electric piano, upright piano, piccolo, alto saxophone, baritone saxophone, tenor saxophone, signal generator, sitar, electric sitar, synthesizer, tape echo, tremolo, vibraphone, viola, wah wah guitar, Wurlitzer piano
- Michael Wait – guitar, fuzz guitar, rhythm guitar, percussion, tape echo, tremolo, wah wah guitar
- Alfredo Fratti – guitar
- Chris Garcia – electric bass
- Jack Waterson – drums, timpani
- Clinton Patterson – trumpet
- Todd Simon – flugelhorn, trumpet
- Michael Leonhart – mellophonium, trumpet
- Dennis Coffey – guitar
- Calibro 35 – guitar, rhythm guitar, percussion
- Shawn Lee – guitar
- Loren Oden – arranger, lead and background vocals
- Rebecca Jordan – arranger, lead and background vocals
- Darren Lee – arranger, lead and background vocals
- Brooke Derosa – lead and background vocals
- Tashai – lead and background vocals
- Byron Minns – monologue
- Dayvora Ortega – whimpering voices
