= Fu-Schnickens =

American hip hop group

- From L–R: Moc-Fu, Poc-Fu, and Chip-Fu

Background information
- Origin: East Flatbush, Brooklyn, U.S.
- Genres: Hip-hop; alternative hip-hop
- Years active: 1988–1995
- Labels: Jive; BMG
- Members: Chip-Fu; Moc-Fu; Poc-Fu

Fu-Schnickens were an American hip-hop trio from 1988 to 1995, based in Brooklyn, New York.

== History ==
Fu-Schnickens was composed of Chip-Fu (Roderick Roachford), Moc-Fu (Joe Jones), and Poc-Fu (Lennox Maturine). Fu stood for unity and schnicken was a made-up word that meant "coalition". The three friends from East Flatbush, Brooklyn, first gained attention after performing at a hip hop event at Howard University, after which the group was signed by Jive Records. The group's debut single, "Ring the Alarm", entered the top ten on the Billboard Hot Rap Tracks chart in 1992, which sparked anticipation for the group's debut album, F.U. Don't Take It Personal, and also inadvertently immortalized and ignited a new-found popularity for the original "Ring the Alarm", the signature tune of dancehall reggae singjay Tenor Saw from 1985, which the group sampled to create its track of the same name. Furthermore, with the hit singles "La Schmoove" (featuring Phife Dawg of A Tribe Called Quest) and "True Fu-Schnick," the album reached the top 20 on the Top R&B/Hip-Hop Albums chart and was certified for gold-level sales by the RIAA.

In 1993, Fu-Schnickens began work on its second album. The group recorded a fast-paced song called "What's Up, Doc?" which featured a sample of Bugs Bunny saying his famous catchphrase. But the group could not get sample clearance from Warner Bros. so the song was shelved. Meanwhile, the then-rookie NBA star Shaquille O'Neal was a media sensation. In many interviews, he talked about his love of hip hop music and stated that the Fu-Schnickens were his favorite hip hop group. This prompted the group to contact O'Neal for a collaboration. O'Neal recorded a verse that was added on to the already-recorded "What's Up, Doc?" with the group and O'Neal saying "What's up, doc?" to replace the Bugs Bunny sample. Although the group had not yet completed work on its album, the song was quickly released as a single to capitalize on O'Neal's popularity. The single was a top-40 hit in the summer of 1993, which briefly propelled the group into the mainstream. The group's second album, Nervous Breakdown, did not arrive until 1994.

The group took part in a huge performance on the finale of The Arsenio Hall Show, alongside the likes of KRS-One, Wu-Tang Clan, Naughty by Nature, MC Lyte, Guru, Mad Lion, Yo-Yo, Das EFX, CL Smooth, and A Tribe Called Quest.

Fu-Schnickens is also notable for its many references to martial arts films and Asian culture before Wu-Tang Clan, which eventually helped make such references popular in hip hop music.

== Discography ==
=== Studio albums ===
- F.U. Don't Take It Personal (1992)
- Nervous Breakdown (1994)

=== Compilation albums ===
List of compilation albums
Title	Album details
Greatest Hits (Note: "Included "Cray-Z" from the 1994 soundtrack album A Low Down Dirty Shame, plus three previously unreleased songs: "Original Rude Boy," "Voice of the Ghetto," and "Bring It Back"")	Released: December 1995; Label: Jive; Formats: CD, Cassette
Fu-Schnickens - True Fu-Schnick	Released: September 12, 2006; Label: Sony BMG; Formats: CD

=== Singles ===
==== As lead artist ====
List of singles, with selected chart positions and certifications, showing year released and album name
Title	Year	Peak chart positions					Certifications	Album
Title	Year	US	US Dance	US R&B	US Rap	AUS	Certifications	Album
"Ring the Alarm"	1991	—	—	—	6	—		F.U. Don't Take It Personal
"La Schmoove" (featuring Phife Dawg)	1992	—	— (Note: "La Schmoove" did not enter the Dance Club Songs, but peaked at number 36 on the Hot Dance Music/Maxi-Singles Sales.)	30	3	—		F.U. Don't Take It Personal
"True Fuschnick"	1992	—	14	97	18	—		F.U. Don't Take It Personal
"Heavenly Father"	1992	—	—	—	—	—		F.U. Don't Take It Personal
"What's Up Doc? (Can We Rock)" (with Shaquille O'Neal)	1993	39	26	56	22	59	RIAA: Gold	Nervous Breakdown and Shaq Diesel
"Breakdown"	1994	67	— (Note: "Breakdown" did not enter the Dance Club Songs, but peaked at number 10 on the Hot Dance Music/Maxi-Singles Sales.)	38	7	—		Nervous Breakdown
"Sum Dum Munkey"	1995	—	—	—	—	—		Nervous Breakdown
"Got It Covered" (Note: "Got It Covered" was released as a split single with "Summer in the City" by The Lovin' Spoonful)	1995	—	—	—	—	—		Die Hard with a Vengeance Soundtrack
"—" denotes a recording that did not chart or was not released in that territory.
