= The Impossible: Mission TV Series – Pt. 1 =

The Impossible: Mission TV Series - Pt. 1

Compilation album by De La Soul
- Released: October 20, 2006
- Recorded: 1991–2006
- Genre: Hip hop
- Length: 42:04 (original); 53:14 (Japanese)
- Label: AOI
- Producers: Supa Dave West, Oh No, Geology, 9th Wonder, J Dilla, De La Soul, Prince Paul

De La Soul chronology
The Grind Date (2004)	The Impossible: Mission TV Series - Pt. 1 (2006)	Are You In? (2009)

Professional ratings
Review scores
Source	Rating
Jam! Showbiz	(favourable)
RapReviews.com	(9/10)

The Impossible: Mission TV Series – Pt. 1 is an album of unreleased material by De La Soul. It contains material recorded over a period of years (dating as far back as De La Soul Is Dead), and was made available through the group's imprint AOI Records. The album's title, and cover, are a reference to the popular action adventure TV series Mission: Impossible. An alternative version of the album presumably catered to the group's Japanese audience, The Impossible Mission: Operation Japan, is also available.

== Track listing ==
=== Standard version ===
1. Impossible Intro
2. Live @ The Dugout '87
3. Voodoo Circus (produced by Supa Dave West)
4. Friends (produced by J Dilla)
5. What The Fuck part one (De La Soul's Poster)
6. Go Out And Get It
7. Beef
8. Reverse Ya Steps (produced by Oh No)
9. You Got It feat. Butta Verses
10. What The Fuck part two
11. Just Havin' A Ball
12. What If?
13. Relax!! (produced by J Dilla)
14. Wasn't For You (Remix) (produced by Ge-Ology) (The original version can be found on the Handsome Boy Modeling School album "White People")
15. Freestyle (Dat Shit) 2006
16. What The Fuck part three
17. Freedom Train (produced by 9th Wonder)

=== Alternate version ===
1. Impossible Intro
2. Live @ The Dugout '87
3. Voodoo Circus (produced by Supa Dave West)
4. Friends (produced by J Dilla)
5. What The F*** #1
6. Go Out And Get I
7. Respect (produced by Supa Dave West)
8. Beef
9. Reverse Ya Steps (produced by Oh No)
10. You Got It feat. Butta Verses
11. What The F*** #2
12. Just Havin' A Ball
13. What If?
14. Relax!! (produced by J Dilla)
15. Wasn't For You (Remix) (produced by Ge-Ology)
16. The Corner
17. Freestyle (Dat Shit) 2006
18. What The F*** #3
19. Freedom Train
20. Live in Tokyo feat. SPD, KAN
