= Clear Lake Audiotorium =

EP by De La Soul
- Released: March 7, 1994
- Genre: Hip hop
- Length: 31:41
- Label: Tommy Boy; Warner Bros.
- Producer: De La Soul; Prince Paul

De La Soul chronology
Buhloone Mindstate (1993)	Clear Lake Audiotorium (1994)	Stakes Is High (1996)

Clear Lake Audiotorium is a six-track promo EP by De La Soul given out to A-list DJs in 1994, the catalog number is TB 1093 (Side A, "THIS SIDE" is TB 1093 A and Side B "OTHER SIDE" is TB 1093 B). It was composed of four tracks from the group's album Buhloone Mindstate and two non-album tracks—"Sh.Fe.Mc's" featuring A Tribe Called Quest, and "Stix & Stonz" featuring The Fearless Four, Grandmaster Caz, and Prince Whipper Whip. With only 500 copies pressed (vinyl and CD), Clear Lake Audiotorium remains one of the most sought-after De La Soul releases to date. Originally pressed on clear/light green vinyl and packaged in a clear plastic sleeve, the record has since been bootlegged on black vinyl. On March 7, 2025, exactly 31 years after its original release, the EP was released officially on streaming releases, alongside a limited physical re-release.

== Track listing ==
1. "In the Woods" – 4:01
  - Featuring: Shortie No Mass
2. "I Am I Be" – 5:03
3. "Sh.Fe.Mc's" – 4:34
  - Featuring: A Tribe Called Quest
4. "Patti Dooke" – 5:39
  - Featuring: Guru
5. "I Be Blowin'" – 4:58
6. "Stix & Stonz" – 7:26
  - Featuring: Tito of The Fearless Four, Grandmaster Caz, Whipper Whip, LA Sunshine, and Superstar

== Charts ==
Chart performance for Clear Lake Audiotorium
Chart (2025)	Peak position
Scottish Albums (OCC)	27
UK Album Downloads (OCC)	78
UK Independent Albums (OCC)	8
UK R&B Albums (OCC)	1
