= All Good? =

2000 single by Chaka Khan and De La Soul

Single by De La Soul featuring Chaka Khan

from the album Art Official Intelligence: Mosaic Thump
- Released: August 23, 2000
- Recorded: 1999–2000
- Genre: Hip hop
- Length: 5:02
- Label: Tommy Boy
- Songwriters: K. Mercer, D. Jolicoeur, V. Mason, C. Khan
- Producers: De La Soul (original), remixes by various producers

De La Soul singles chronology
"Oooh." (2000)	"All Good?" (2000)	"Thru Ya City" (2001)

"All Good?" is the second single from De La Soul's fifth album, Art Official Intelligence: Mosaic Thump, released on August 23, 2000. It was a collaboration between the group and soul legend Chaka Khan, who sings an extended hook that leads into each verse. The song was notably popular in Europe where it received numerous remix treatments.

The song talks about people who abandoned or shunned the group after their initial commercial success and popularity took a dive, and those who attempt to hop back on the bandwagon. The title of the song is a phrase implying that something is either okay ("all good") or not okay ("it ain't all good") as sung by Chaka, during the chorus. The music video version of this song takes place at a car wash based on the film Car Wash and features a cameo appearance from actor Frank Vincent.

== Track listing ==
US release (CD single)

1. "All Good? (Original Mix)" - 5:02
  - Guest Appearance: Chaka Khan
2. "All Good? (Royal G Remix)" - 3:41
3. "All Good? (MJ Cole Remix)" - 5:11
4. "All Good? (Ugo & Sanz Chaka's Affair)" - 7:25
5. "All Good? (Razor & Guido Duhb Mix)" - 8:31

US release (12" single)

1. "All Good? (Clean)"
  - Guest Appearance: Chaka Khan
2. "All Good? (Dirty)"
  - Guest Appearance: Chaka Khan
3. "All Good? (Instrumental)"
4. "All Good? (Acappella)"
5. "Declaration (Clean)"
6. "Declaration (Dirty)"
7. "Declaration (Instrumental)"
8. "Declaration (Acappella)"

UK release

1. "All Good? (Radio Edit) - 3:59
  - Guest Appearance: Chaka Khan
2. "All Good? (Album Version) - 4:59
  - Guest Appearance: Chaka Khan
3. "All Good? (MJ Cole Remix) - 5:11
4. "All Good? (MJ Cole Instrumental) - 5:11

Australian release

1. "All Good? (Radio Edit) - 3:58
  - Guest Appearance: Chaka Khan
2. "All Good? (Royal G's Remix) - 3:42
3. "All Good? (Ugo And Sanz Chaka's Affair) - 7:26
4. "All Good? (MJ Cole Vocal Mix) - 5:12
5. "All Good? (Razor N' Guido Dub Mix) - 8:32
6. "All Good? (Ugo And Sanz Dubalicious Mix) - 6:45
7. "All Good? (MJ Cole Instrumental) - 5:11

== Charts ==
Chart (2000–01)	Peak Position
Australia (ARIA)	34
Australian Urban (ARIA)	10
Belgium (Ultratip Bubbling Under Flanders)	3
Belgium (Ultratop 50 Wallonia)	25
France (SNEP)	29
Germany (GfK)	76
Netherlands (Single Top 100)	76
Sweden (Sverigetopplistan)	58
Switzerland (Schweizer Hitparade)	64
UK Singles (OCC)	33
US Billboard Hot 100	96
US Dance Club Songs (Billboard)	17
US Hot R&B/Hip-Hop Songs (Billboard)	41
US Hot Rap Songs (Billboard)	6
