= Plug 1 & Plug 2 Present... First Serve =

Studio album by De La Soul's Plug 1 & Plug 2
- Released: April 3, 2012
- Recorded: 2010–2012
- Genres: East Coast hip-hop, alternative hip-hop
- Length: 65:26
- Labels: Duck Down Music, PIAS
- Producers: Chokolate & Khalid Filali a.k.a. 2&4

De La Soul's Plug 1 & Plug 2 chronology
Are You In? (2009)	Plug 1 & Plug 2 Present... First Serve (2012)	And the Anonymous Nobody... (2016)

Professional ratings
Aggregate scores
Source	Rating
Metacritic	72/100
Review scores
Source	Rating
AllMusic	3.5/5 stars
The A.V. Club	B
Clash	7/10
Consequence of Sound	3.5/5 stars
HipHopDX	4/5 stars
Mojo	4/5 stars
PopMatters	6/10
Q	3/5 stars
RapReviews	8/10
Rolling Stone	3.5/5 stars

Plug 1 & Plug 2 Present... First Serve is an album from hip-hop group De La Soul members Kelvin Mercer (a.k.a. Plug 1), and David Jolicoeur (a.k.a. Plug 2), in collaboration with French DJ duo Chokolate and Khalid, released on April 3, 2012.

In the album the duo adopt the persona of "First Serve" a hip-hop band making it in the music industry in the late 1990s. Mercer takes the persona of "Jacob 'Pop Life' Barrow", and Jolicoeur takes the persona of "Deen Witter". The album details the fictional band making it in the music industry, their success, breakup, and eventual reformation.

Jolicoeur and Mercer have been interviewed in character as Barrow and Witter, often quoting De La Soul as an "influence", and describing De La Soul as "those guys".

== Track listing ==
Plug 1 & Plug 2 Present... First Serve track listing
No.	Title	Length
1.	"Opening Credits"	3:39
2.	"Pushin' Aside, Pushin' Along"	4:15
3.	"The Work"	4:07
4.	"Small Disasters"	2:40
5.	"We Made It"	4:29
6.	"We Made It – Interlude"	0:49
7.	"Must B the Music"	4:09
8.	"Goon TV – Interlude"	1:22
9.	"The Book of Life"	4:01
10.	"Clash Symphony"	3:25
11.	"Pop Life"	5:17
12.	"Tennis"	4:15
13.	"The Top Chefs"	3:00
14.	"Backstage – Interlude"	1:32
15.	"Move 'Em In, Move 'Em Out"	5:08
16.	"Ending Credits"	3:08
