= Shoomp/Much More =

2003 Single by De La Soul featuring Sean Paul, Yummy Bingham and DJ Premier

Single by De La Soul featuring Sean Paul, Yummy Bingham and DJ Premier

from the album The Grind Date
- Released: 2003
- Genre: Hip hop
- Length: 3:41
- Label: AOI
- Songwriters: K. Mercer, D. Jolicoeur, V. Mason, J. Yancey, S. P. Henriques, E. Bingham
- Producer: J Dilla

De La Soul singles chronology
"Say "I Gotta Believe!"" (2002)	"Shoomp/Much More" (2003)	"Shopping Bags (She Got from You)" (2004)

Sean Paul single singles chronology
"Get Busy" (2003)	"Shoomp" (2003)	"Like Glue" (2003)

Yummy Bingham single singles chronology
"Baby Phat" (2001)	"Much More" (2003)

DJ Premier singles chronology
"Much More" (2003)	"B.A.P. (Bumpy and Premier)" (2011)

"Shoomp/Much More" is a double A-side single by De La Soul released in 2003. "Shoomp" features Sean Paul, while "Much More" features the high-pitched vocals of Yummy Bingham. Both songs were produced by J Dilla, who at the time was exploring a sound more off-kilter than the neo-soul style that he was known for through his work with Erykah Badu, The Roots, and Common. The song was the first release from the group after they left their longtime label Tommy Boy, in 2002. After receiving poor promotion for their previous album AOI: Bionix, the group decided to find a new home and established their own independent imprint, called AOI Records.

"Shoomp" contains samples from the intro to Sean Paul's hit song "Like Glue", as well as "Genius of Love" by Tom Tom Club. "Much More" contains samples from "Love Ballad" by L.T.D. & elements of "Strawberry Letter 23 by Shuggie Otis & The Brothers Johnson.

The promo 12" single was edited in March 2003 with "Much More" as the A-side and "Shoomp" as the B-side. De La Soul and Yummy shot a live video of "Much More" on an April 2003 episode of Comedy Central's Chappelle's Show. When the single was released in the UK, "Shoomp" became the A-side, due to the popularity of Sean Paul, and "Much More" became the B-side. The 12" vinyl-only single was released on August 4, 2003 in the UK and reached number #85.

De La Soul would perform "Much More" in Season 1 Episode 11 of Chappelle's Show.

Lupe Fiasco used the beat for "Much More" as well as Yummy's chorus for a song of the same title on the mixtape "Fahrenheit 1/15 Part II: Revenge of the Nerds".

== Track listing ==
1. "Shoomp (Dirty)" - 3:41
  - Guest Appearance: Sean Paul
2. "Shoomp (Clean)" - 3:41
  - Guest Appearance: Sean Paul
3. "Shoomp (Instrumental)" - 3:39
4. "Shoomp (Acapella)" - 3:01
  - Guest Appearance: Sean Paul
5. "Much More (Dirty)" - 4:02
  - Guest Appearance: Yummy Bingham & DJ Premier
6. "Much More (Clean)" - 4:01
  - Guest Appearance: Yummy Bingham & DJ Premier
7. "Much More (Instrumental)" - 4:01
8. "Much More (Acapella)" - 3:25
  - Guest Appearance: Yummy Bingham & DJ Premier
