= Ego Trippin' (Part Two) =

1994 single by De La Soul

Single by De La Soul

from the album Buhloone Mindstate
- Released: 1993
- Recorded: 1993
- Genre: Jazz rap
- Length: 3:52
- Label: Tommy Boy
- Songwriters: P. Huston, K. Mercer, D. Jolicoeur, V. Mason
- Producers: Prince Paul, De La Soul

De La Soul singles chronology
"Breakadawn" (1993)	"Ego Trippin' (Part Two)" (1993)	"Fallin'" (1994)

"Ego Trippin' (Part Two)" is a 1994 single by American hip hop group De La Soul and the second single to be released from the group's 1993 album Buhloone Mindstate.

The song utilizes music samples and lyric interpolation taken from the songs of other artists including Al Hirt's track "Harlem Hendoo" from his 1967 album entitled Soul in the Horn and various hiphop based songs at the time. Shortie No Mass contributed vocals to the song and appears throughout the music video.

The song appears in the 1995 film Mr. Holland's Opus.

== Track listing ==
1. "Ego Trippin' (Part Two) (Original Version)" – 3:52 (Produced by De La Soul & Prince Paul)
2. "Ego Trippin' (Part Two) (LA Jay Remix)" – 4:13 (Remixed by LA Jay & Royme)
3. "Ego Trippin' (Part Two) (Original Instrumental)" – 3:52 (Produced by De La Soul & Prince Paul)
4. "Ego Trippin' (Part Three) (Egoristic Mix)" – 4:42 (Remixed by Spearhead X, Co-Remixed by The Beat Messiahs)
5. "Ego Trippin' (Part Two) (Gumbo Funk Remix)" – 5:46 (Remixed by N.O. Joe)
6. "Lovely How I Let My Mind Float" – 4:02 (Produced by De La Soul & Prince Paul)
  - Guest Appearance: Biz Markie
7. "Ego Trippin' (Part Three) (Egoristic Instrumental)" – 4:40 (Remixed by Spearhead X, Co-Remixed by The Beat Messiahs)

== Charts ==
Chart (1994)	Peak Position
US Dance Singles Sales (Billboard)	50
US Hot R&B/Hip-Hop Songs (Billboard)	74
