= When I Look at You (disambiguation) =

When I Look At You is a single by Miley Cyrus.

When I Look At You may also refer to these songs:

- "When I Look At You", a single by Anita Harris
- "When I Look At You", by Grover Washington, Jr.
- "When I Look At You", by The Jacksons
- "When I Look At You", from the musical The Scarlet Pimpernel (musical)
- "It Only Happens (When I Look at You)" by Aretha Franklin from album Stakes Is High
- "When I Look At You", song by Roads End (band)
- "When I Look At You", song by Dean Randolph
- "When I Look At You", song by The Encores
