= Pain (De La Soul song) =

Single by De La Soul featuring Snoop Dogg

from the album and the Anonymous Nobody...
- Released: June 1, 2016
- Recorded: 2016
- Genre: Hip hop; G-funk
- Length: 4:39
- Label: AOI; Kobalt
- Songwriters: Calvin Broadus; Kelvin Mercer; David Jude Jolicoeur; Vincent Mason
- Producers: Supa Dave West; De La Soul

De La Soul singles chronology
| "Trainwreck" (2016) | "Pain" (2016) | "Royalty Capes" (2016) |

Snoop Dogg singles chronology
| "Back Up" (2015) | "Pain" (2016) | "Westside" (2016) |

Music video
- "Pain (feat. Snoop Dogg)" on YouTube

"Pain" is a song by American hip hop group De La Soul, featuring vocals from American hip hop recording artist Snoop Dogg. was released on June 1, 2016 as the second single of their eighth studio album and the Anonymous Nobody..., with the record labels AOI Records and Kobalt Label Services. The song was produced by Supa Dave West.

== Music video ==
The official music video for the song was released on December 7, 2016 and features many workers singing along with the song while working.

== Track listing ==
- Digital download
1. "Pain" (featuring Snoop Dogg) – 4:39

== Charts ==
=== Weekly charts ===
| Chart (2016) | Peak position |
|---|---|
| Belgium Urban (Ultratop Flanders) | 40 |
| France (SNEP) | 156 |
| Mexico Ingles Airplay (Billboard) | 45 |
