= Oooh. =

2000 single by Redman and De La Soul

Single by De La Soul featuring Redman

from the album Art Official Intelligence: Mosaic Thump
- Released: July 10, 2000
- Recorded: 1997–1999
- Genre: Hip hop
- Length: 3:33
- Label: Tommy Boy
- Songwriters: K. Mercer; D. Jolicoeur; V. Mason; R. Noble
- Producer: De La Soul

De La Soul singles chronology
| "4 More" (1997) | "Oooh." (2000) | "All Good?" (2000) |

Redman singles chronology
| "Y.O.U." (2000) | "Oooh." (2000) | "Let's Get Dirty (I Can't Get in da Club)" (2001) |

"Oooh." is the first single from De La Soul's fifth album, Art Official Intelligence: Mosaic Thump, released in 2000.

== Music video ==
The music video for this song is a hip-hop take on “The Wizard of Oz”. After being denied entry into a nightclub called Brick City, a woman and her pet chihuahua attempt to sneak in, only to trip and fall unconscious. When the woman wakes up, she finds herself in the Land of Oooh, where the three members of De La Soul (as The Scarecrow, The Tin Man, and the Cowardly Lion) take the woman on a quest to get into Brick City for meet The Wiz, all while thwarting a Wicked Witch who goes after the woman wearing her silver platform heels (a reference to the book version, where Dorothy's slippers were silver and not the famous ruby-red ones from the 1939 film).

The video features Dave Chappelle as the Brick City doorman, Redman are The Wiz, Rah Digga as the Dorothy-like protagonist, and Stacey MacKenzie as the Wicked Witch. Some versions of the music video feature a short scene where the Dorothy-like protagonist argues with a taxi driver (played by Posdnuos) over a cab fare and tip, but that version is rarely shown. Most versions seen online start when the woman asks the doorman (Dave Chappelle) if she is on the guest list and the doorman mocking her clothes and the chihuahua in her purse.

== Track listing ==
CD 1

1. "Oooh" (original version) – 3:33
  - Guest appearance: Redman
2. "So Good" – 4:26
  - Guest appearance: Camp Lo
3. "Oooh" (instrumental) – 3:33

CD 2

1. "Oooh." (original version) – 3:33
  - Guest appearance: Redman
2. "Oooh." (instrumental) – 3:33
3. "Words & Verbs" featuring Kovas – 3:51

== Charts ==
Chart performance for "Oooh."
| Chart (2000) | Peak position |
|---|---|
| Australia (ARIA) | 91 |
| Germany (GfK) | 52 |
| Netherlands (Single Top 100) | 48 |
| Switzerland (Schweizer Hitparade) | 94 |
| UK Singles (OCC) | 29 |
| US Bubbling Under Hot 100 (Billboard) | 25 |
| US Hot R&B/Hip-Hop Songs (Billboard) | 44 |

== Link ==
https://www.imdb.com/title/tt27047519/
