= Are You In?: Nike+ Original Run =

Mixtape by De La Soul
- Released: April 28, 2009
- Recorded: 2009
- Studios: The Bes' Mayne; Upstairs; The Grape Room
- Genres: Hip hop; electronic; funk
- Length: 44:17
- Label: Nike+ Sport Music
- Producers: De La Soul; Flosstradamus; Young RJ; Trackademicks

De La Soul chronology
The Impossible: Mission TV Series - Pt. 1 (2006)	Are You In?: Nike+ Original Run (2009)	First Serve (2012)

Are You In?: Nike+ Original Run (a pun on "R-U-N") is an iTunes exclusive mixtape by hip hop trio De La Soul, in association with Nike. The album is produced by Flosstradamus. In the past, De La Soul collaborated with Nike to make designer shoes, and months later was picked to be a part of Nike's Original Run series, aimed at runners. Are You In? was the first album by De La Soul in five years and is one long continuous mixtape released on iTunes with an additional digital booklet. It was generally well received by music and hip hop critics and was reviewed by Wired, Urb, and the Hip Hop DX online magazine.

== Production ==
In the past De La Soul teamed up with Nike, Inc. to make designer shoes, as well as the company collaborating with many other bands such as A-Trak. The duo was picked months later to be a part of Nike's Original Run series, which Nike has already made five albums. De La Soul released the iTunes exclusive album in celebration of 3 Feet High and Rising's 20th anniversary, in association with Nike. The album is a part of the "Nike - Sports Music" series, specifically designed for runners. Posdnuos of De La Soul stated, "When we first heard about this project we were psyched on the challenge. We pride ourselves on being able to get bodies moving, so it was cool to do it with a specific goal in mind – giving runners the sonic fuel to clock some miles." Are You In? was the first album by De La Soul to be released in five years. The album artwork was designed by Joe Buckingham, Posdnuos' favorite graffiti artist, who also designed various other De La Soul covers and designs.

== Reception ==
Professional ratings
Aggregate scores
Source	Rating
Metacritic	71/100
Review scores
Source	Rating
AllMusic	2/5 stars
HipHopDX	3.5/5 stars
Pitchfork Media	6.4/10
PopMatters	6/10 stars
Sputnikmusic	4/5 stars
Urb	4/5 stars

Are You In?: Nike+ Original Run generally received positive reviews from music critics, as Metacritic gave it a score of 71 out of 100. Wired magazine's Scott Thill stated that the mix is a "digital blast" starting with "atmospheric ambience" and sprinting to "head-banging stomps and Planet Rock-like synthetic funk without letting up." Thill noted that the album is not anywhere near as good as 3 Feet High and Rising, but beats mainstream artists such as Kanye West and 50 Cent who have been "polluting hip-hop since the turn of the century." Hip Hop DX's Jake Paine stated that the style of the album goes towards more "Freestyle and Electronic" rather than "Jazz or Soul." Paine said besides that the lyrics remain "razor sharp" and that it deserves a CD-release as well. "The quirky beat sounds as if it was crafted in Madlib’s kitchen, for its quick fades and obscure, isolated samples." said Jake Paine. The review was also featured in Idio webzine.

Like 2006’s The Mission: Impossible TV mixtape, De La Soul doesn’t present this as an album, nor do fans want them to. As a retail mixtape, this work may hint at De La’s latest progressions, going into their third decade, but it’s also to be assumed that Flosstradamus won’t be fully at the helm for the next studio album. Regardless, Nike makes Hip Hop more fun than most labels this year, as this work meets the quality standard that’s been going on since the D.A.I.S.Y. Age. Leave your rollerskates at home for this one, and put on your Air Maxes, however, it’s still a damn good jam.

— Jake Paine, quoted from review.

Urb's "The Machine" praised the album in a four-star review for Flosstradamus's work on the mix, the contrast of genres, and the fact Nike didn't water De La Soul down. "Truth be told, they come pretty hard" said The Machine. On the downside he said that the album does not wholly "satiate the senses" as a long-awaited album should. The Machine stated that the mix is like "a dear friend who is in town for only a day or two."

== Track listing ==
The album is one long continuous mixtape with most tracks produced by disc jockey duo Flosstradamus. Young RJ produced "Mornin' Rise" and "Forever". Supa Dave West produced "Big Mouf". Maseo produced "Greedy Man", and De La Soul produced "Victory Laps". The mix also comes with a digital booklet on iTunes. Below is a list of track names and approximate start times in the continuous mix:

No.	Title	Start Time	Length
1.	"Mornin' Rise" (featuring Raheem DeVaughn)	00:00	7:41
2.	"Good Morning"	07:41	4:05
3.	"Big Mouf"	11:46	5:18
4.	"Attack of 'The Stet'"	17:04	4:11
5.	"Pick Up the Pace (Run)"	21:15	4:53
6.	"Poetic Greed" (featuring Gina Loring)	26:08	0:52
7.	"Greedy Man" (featuring Billy Ray)	27:00	5:01
8.	"We O.D."	32:01	2:13
9.	"Victory Laps"	34:14	5:32
10.	"Forever"	39:46	4:31
Total length:			44:17

=== Samples ===
The continuous track features three sampled sounds and voices of the following tracks: "100 Miles and Runnin'" by N.W.A, "Ease Back" by Ultramagnetic MCs, and "Go Stetsa" by Stetsasonic.
