= Itzsoweezee (Hot) =

Single by De La Soul

from the album Stakes Is High
- Released: 1996
- Recorded: 1996
- Genre: Hip hop
- Length: 4:55
- Label: Tommy Boy
- Songwriter(s): K. Mercer; D. Jolicoeur; V. Mason
- Producer(s): De La Soul

De La Soul singles chronology
| "Stakes Is High" (1996) | "Itzsoweezee (Hot)" (1996) | "4 More" (1997) |

"Itzsoweezee (Hot)" is a song by De La Soul and the second single to be released from their fourth album, Stakes Is High, which was released in 1996. The song is entirely performed by group member Trugoy the Dove.

The video directed by Marcus Turner to "Itzsoweezee" remains one of the group's most famous. The concept is a school lunchroom in which many of the respected MCs in Hip-Hop come to eat which eventually leads to a food fight. Students eating at the tables include Prince Paul, members of The Roots, Jungle Brothers, A Tribe Called Quest, Lords of the Underground, Pete Rock, Guru, Kid Capri and many more.

The B-side to the single was a remix of "Stakes Is High" featuring Mos Def and Truth Enola.

== Track listing ==
1. "Itzsoweezee (Hot)" (album version)
2. "Itzsoweezee (Hot)" (De La Soul Remix featuring Yankee B)
3. "Itzsoweezee (Hot)" (album instrumental)
4. "Stakes Is High" (Remix)
  - Guest appearances: Mos Def, Truth Enola
  - Remix: Jay Dee
5. "Stakes Is High" (remix instrumental)
6. "Itzsoweezee (Hot)" (a cappella)

== Charts ==
| Chart (1996) | Peak Position |
|---|---|
| U.S. Billboard Bubbling Under Hot 100 Singles | 13 |
| U.S. Billboard Hot R&B/Hip-Hop Songs | 60 |
