= 4 More =

Single by De La Soul featuring Zhané

from the album Stakes Is High
- Released: 1997
- Recorded: 1996
- Genre: Hip hop
- Length: 4:18
- Label: Tommy Boy
- Songwriter(s): K. Mercer, D. Jolicoeur, V. Mason, G. Scott, M. Hall, N. Hall, E. Matthew, D. Payne.
- Producer(s): O.Gee, De La Soul (co-producers)

De La Soul singles chronology
"Itzsoweezee (HOT)" (1996)	"4 More" (1997)	"Oooh." (2000)

Zhané singles chronology
"It's a Party" (1996)	"4 More" (1997)	"Jamboree" (1999)

"4 More" is the third and final single released by De La Soul from their fourth album, Stakes Is High. The song deals with relationships, and features R&B duo Zhané. It was produced by De La Soul and DJ O.Gee from D.I.T.C. Rolling Stone included "4 More" in its list of the group's best fifteen songs.

== Track listing ==
1. "4 More (Clean Version)" - 4:19
  - Guest Appearances: Zhane
2. "Supa Emcees (Clean Version)" - 3:47
3. "Sweet Dreams (Clean Version)" - 3:27
4. "Itzsoweezee (HOT) (De La Soul Remix)" - 4:37
  - Guest Appearances: Yankee B

== Charts ==
Chart (1997)	Peak Position
UK Singles Chart	52
