= Art Official Intelligence: Mosaic Thump =

Studio album by De La Soul
- Released: August 8, 2000
- Genre: Hip hop
- Length: 66:46
- Label: Tommy Boy
- Producers: De La Soul; Supa Dave West; Rockwilder; Jay Dee; Mr. Khaliyl; Deaf 2 U Inc.

De La Soul chronology
Stakes Is High (1996)	Art Official Intelligence: Mosaic Thump (2000)	AOI: Bionix (2001)

Singles from Art Official Intelligence: Mosaic Thump
- 1. "Oooh." Released: July 10, 2000; 2. "Thru Ya City" Released: 2000; 3. "All Good?" Released: August 23, 2000

Alternative covers
- Japanese cover

Art Official Intelligence: Mosaic Thump is the fifth studio album by American hip hop group De La Soul. It was released on August 8, 2000.

== Overview ==
The album was the first in a planned three-disc installment, which was originally intended to be a three-disc album. Among the guests on the album are, Redman, Tash and J-Ro of Tha Liks, Xzibit, Busta Rhymes, Mike D and Ad Rock of the Beastie Boys, Busy Bee, Freddie Foxxx and soul diva Chaka Khan.

Unlike their previous album, Stakes Is High, Mosaic Thump returned De La Soul to chart territory again thanks to the hit singles "Oooh." and "All Good?". The album was also nominated for a Grammy.

The Japanese version of the album featured album art by celebrity hip hop-inspired manga artist Santa Inoue.

== Critical reception ==
Professional ratings
Aggregate scores
Source	Rating
Metacritic	75/100
Review scores
Source	Rating
AllMusic	2/5 stars
Entertainment Weekly	B+
Los Angeles Times	2.5/4 stars
Mojo	3.5/5 stars
NME	7/10
RapReviews	9/10
Rolling Stone	3.5/5 stars
Select	4/5 stars
USA Today	3.5/4 stars
The Village Voice	A−

Art Official Intelligence: Mosaic Thump generally received positive reviews from critics. James Poletti of Yahoo! Music gave the album an eight out of ten star review. "In keeping with the current vogue for hip hop albums with more guests than Letterman, over 50 per cent of this album features appearances from everyone from Redman to Chaka Khan", which he said may or may not have something to do with finding a unique voice in hip hop. "The really refreshing change with De La Soul is not simply their lack of bullshit but their proud rejection of hip-hop's nihilism." Michael Goldberg of Neumu gave the album the same eight out of ten star review and simply said that the number of guest stars in the album, "keeps things lively". "The grooves are righteous and the vibe is right" Goldberg stated.

Robert Christgau stated: "Once pranksters whose greatest pleasure was disrupting the groove they adored, they've evolved into hip-hop's purest musicians...The lyrics are intelligent of course, clever and moral and street-conscious and just gnomic enough, but their art is in their beats and flow and tunes too."

== Commercial performance ==
In their home country of the United States, Art Official Intelligence: Mosaic Thump debuted at number 9 on the Billboard 200, selling 81,000 copies in its first week.

== Track listing ==
No.	Title	Writer(s)	Producer(s)	Length
1.	"Spitkicker.com / Say R. (Intro)"		De La Soul	1:19
2.	"U Can Do (Life)"	Kelvin Mercer; Vincent Mason; David Jolicoeur; Dave West; Nile Rodgers; Bernard Edwards	Supa Dave West	4:23
3.	"My Writes" (featuring Tash, J-Ro, and Xzibit)	K. Mercer; V. Mason; D. Jolicoeur; Michael McBride; Rico Smith; James Robinson; Alvin Joiner	Ad Lib; De La Soul (co.)	5:29
4.	"Oooh." (featuring Redman)	K. Mercer; V. Mason; D. Jolicoeur; Lalo Schifrin	De La Soul	5:24
5.	"Thru Ya City" (featuring D.V. Alias Khrist)	K. Mercer; V. Mason; D. Jolicoeur; James Yancey	Jay Dee	3:29
6.	"I.C. Y'All" (featuring Busta Rhymes)	K. Mercer; V. Mason; D. Jolicoeur; Trevor Smith; Dana Stinson; Thomas Allen; Harold Ray Brown; Morris Dickerson; Gerald Goldstein; Leroy Jordan; Lee Levitin; Charles Miller; Howard E. Scott	Rockwilder	3:21
7.	"View"	K. Mercer; V. Mason; D. Jolicoeur	De La Soul	4:18
8.	"Set The Mood" (featuring Indeed)	K. Mercer; V. Mason; D. Jolicoeur; Acklins Dillon; Kevin Bozeman	Mr. Khaliyl	4:23
9.	"All Good?" (featuring Chaka Khan)	K. Mercer; V. Mason; D. Jolicoeur; Chaka Khan; D. West	De La Soul	4:59
10.	"Declaration"	K. Mercer; V. Mason; D. Jolicoeur; Albert Johnson; Kejuan Muchita; William Griffin; Art Neville; Leo Nocentelli; Joseph Modeliste; George Porter; Erick Sermon; Parrish Smith; Ahmir Thompson; Malik Smart; Tarik Collins; James Poyser; Karl Jenkins	De La Soul	2:56
11.	"Squat!" (featuring Mike D & Ad-Rock of the Beastie Boys)	K. Mercer; V. Mason; D. Jolicoeur; Michael Diamond; Adam Horovitz	De La Soul	4:14
12.	"Words from the Chief Rocker" (featuring Busy Bee Starski)	K. Mercer; V. Mason; D. Jolicoeur; Fred Brathwaite	De La Soul	1:01
13.	"With Me"	K. Mercer; V. Mason; D. Jolicoeur; Marvin Gaye; Leon Ware; Arthur Ross	De La Soul	4:50
14.	"Copa (Cabanga)"	K. Mercer; V. Mason; D. Jolicoeur; D. West	Supa Dave West	4:06
15.	"Foolin'"	K. Mercer; V. Mason; D. Jolicoeur; Lucious Mercer; L. Ware; Pam Sawyer	De La Soul; Deaf 2 U Inc.	4:22
16.	"The Art of Getting Jumped"	K. Mercer; V. Mason; D. Jolicoeur; Luther Vandross; Marcus Miller	De La Soul	3:48
17.	"U Don't Wanna B.D.S." (featuring Freddie Foxxx)	K. Mercer; V. Mason; D. Jolicoeur	De La Soul	4:13

Sample credits

- "U Can Do (Life)" contains a sample from "Le Freak", written by Bernard Edwards and Nile Rodgers, and performed by Chic.
- "Oooh." contains replayed elements from "Enter the Dragon", written by Lalo Schifrin.
- "Thru Ya City" contains replayed elements from "Summer in the City", written by Steve Boone, John Sebastian, and Mark Sebastian.
- "I.C. Y'All" contains interpolations from "Galaxy", written by Thomas Allen, Harold Ray Brown, Morris Dickerson, Gerald Goldstein, Leroy Jordan, Lee Levitin, Charles Miller, and Howard E. Scott.
- "Declaration" contains:
  - a portion of "Tru Master"; written by Peter Phillips, Jason Hunter, Ricardo Brown, and James Brown; and performed by Pete Rock.
  - an element of "Hoodlum"; written by Albert Johnson, Kejuan Muchita, and William Griffin; and performed by Mobb Deep.
  - an element of "Never Seen Before"; written by Art Neville, Leo Nocentelli, Joseph Modeliste, George Porter, Erick Sermon, and Parrish Smith; and performed by EPMD.
  - an element of "Don't See Us"; written by Ahmir Thompson, Malik Smart, Tarik Collins, James Poyser, and Karl Jenkins; and performed by The Roots.
- "Words from the Chief Rocker" contains:
  - samples from "Down by Law", written by Fred Brathwaite.
  - some lyrics from the song "Battle at the Dixie".
- "With Me" contains elements from "After the Dance"; written by Marvin Gaye, Leon Ware, and Arthur Ross; and performed by Marvin Gaye.
- "Foolin'" contains elements from "If I Ever Lose This Heaven", written by Leon Ware and Pam Sawyer, and performed by Quincy Jones.
- "The Art of Getting Jumped" contains:
  - interpolations from "Jump to It", written by Luther Vandross and Marcus Miller.
  - a sample from "I Got to Have It"; written by Edward Anderson, Kevin Bonners, and Tedd Whiting; and performed by Ed O.G. and Da Bulldogs.
  - "contains samples from "A Dor É Curta e o Nome É Cumprido", written by Tom Ze'Odair/Cabeça de Poeta, and performed by Odair Cabeça de Poeta e Grupo Capote.
  - contains a portion of "Go Stetsa I"; written by Glenn Bolton, Arnold Hamilton, Paul Huston, Martin Nemly, Leonardo Roman, and Marvin Wright; and performed by Stetsasonic.

== Charts ==
Weekly charts for Art Official Intelligence: Mosaic Thump
Chart (2000)	Peak Position
Australian Albums (ARIA)	32
European Albums (European Top 100 Albums)	23
Dutch Albums (Album Top 100)	25
French Albums (SNEP)	26
German Albums (Offizielle Top 100)	16
Swiss Albums (Schweizer Hitparade)	25
UK Albums (Official Charts)	22
US Billboard 200	9
US Top R&B/Hip-Hop Albums (Billboard)	3

== Certifications ==
Certifications for Art Official Intelligence: Mosaic Thump
Region	Certification	Certified units/sales
United Kingdom (BPI)	Silver	60,000^{^}
^{^} Shipments figures based on certification alone.
