= Stakes Is High (song) =

Single by De La Soul

from the album Stakes Is High
- Released: June 17, 1996
- Recorded: 1995
- Genre: Hip hop
- Length: 5:30
- Label: Tommy Boy
- Songwriters: K. Mercer, D. Jolicoeur, V. Mason, J. Yancey, A. Jamal, L. R. Lynn
- Producers: De La Soul, Jay Dee

De La Soul singles chronology
"Fallin' (with Teenage Fanclub)" (1994)	"Stakes Is High" (1996)	"Itzsoweezee (HOT)" (1996)

"Stakes Is High" is a song by American hip-hop group De La Soul, released in June 1996 as the first single from their fourth studio album of the same name (1996).

== Overview ==
Released during the height of the East Vs. West (coast) rap rivalries, "Stakes..." was a relentless attack on what De La saw as a decline, not only in hip hop music, but also in hip hop culture. The song included many memorable lines such as Posdnous' "Gun control means using both hands in my land...". Dave's input was no less outspoken: "I'm sick of bitches shakin' asses / I'm sick of talkin' about blunts / Sick of Versace glasses / Sick of slang / Sick of half-ass awards shows / Sick of name brand clothes..."

Posdnous also makes a point to inform us that the Native Tongues are still together when he states: "A meteor has more right than my people / Who be wastin' time screaming who they've hated / That's why the Native Tongues have officially been re-instated" An announcement which was furthered by appearing with old friends such as A Tribe Called Quest in the video.

The song was one of the earliest mainstream productions to be handled by hip hop producer J Dilla (known then as Jay Dee). The B-side to the single was "The Bizness", featuring Common. This song talks about the music industry.

In 2023, Billboard and Stereogum ranked the song number six and number two, respectively, on their lists of the 10 greatest De La Soul songs.

== Music video ==
The music video for "Stakes Is High" has all three members of De La Soul on an episode of The Maury Povich Show (with Povich appearing as himself) about hip-hop culture in the 1990s and how much of an influence it is on the world, along with clips of each De La Soul member doing typical household chores (raking leaves, doing laundry, etc.). Fellow Native Tongues group A Tribe Called Quest, Mos Def, Common, MCA, & Jerry Stackhouse also made cameo appearances in the music video.

== Track listing ==
1. "Stakes Is High (Album Version)"
2. "Stakes Is High (Instrumental)"
3. "Stakes Is High (A Cappella)"
4. "The Bizness (Album Version)"
  - Guest Appearance: Common
5. "The Bizness (Clean Version)"
  - Guest Appearance: Common
6. "The Bizness (Instrumental)"

== Personnel ==
"Stakes Is High"

Produced by Jay Dee
Co-Produced by De La Soul
Written by K. Mercer, D. Jolicoeur, V. Mason & J. Yancey
Published by Tee Girl Music/Daisy Age Music (BMI)/Ephcy Music (ASCAP)
Contains samples from "Mind Power" by James Brown and "Swahililand" by Ahmad Jamal

"The Bizness"

Featuring Common
Produced by De La Soul
Written by K. Mercer, D. Jolicoeur, V. Mason & L. Lynn
Published by Tee Girl Music/Daisy Age Music (BMI)
Common appears courtesy of Relativity Records

== Charts ==
Chart (1996)	Peak Position
Australia (ARIA)	117
UK Singles (OCC)	55
US Hot R&B/Hip-Hop Songs (Billboard)	53
US Cash Box Top 100	81
