= Shopping Bags (She Got from You) =

Single by De La Soul featuring Daniel Wallace

from the album The Grind Date
- Released: 2004
- Recorded: 2004
- Genre: Hip hop
- Length: 3:57
- Label: Sanctuary Urban
- Songwriter(s): K. Mercer, D. Jolicoeur, V. Mason, O. Jackson Jr., D. West
- Producer(s): Madlib, Dave West

De La Soul singles chronology
"Shoomp/Much More" (2003)	"Shopping Bags (She Got from You)" (2004)	"Feel Good Inc." (2005)

"Shopping Bags (She Got from You)" is the first official single to be released by De La Soul, from their seventh studio album, The Grind Date. The song was a diatribe about gold-diggers, and was produced by California-based producer, Madlib. The B-side to the single, was the song "The Grind Date", produced by Supa Dave West, and featuring samples from "Nous Sommes Du Soleil" by Yes.

== Music video ==
When released, BET refused to play the video to "Shopping Bags (She Got from You)", claiming that De La Soul were no longer relevant to their audience. BET's actions outraged many, who felt that the television network was outright disrespecting one of hip hop's legendary groups. BET remained unyielding and in 2005 gave North Carolina group Little Brother, the same dubious honor, this time citing their reason for not playing the video to "Lovin' It" as it being "too intelligent for their audience". The network, however, relented upon this decision some several months afterwards.

The music video starts with a reporter interviewing a woman with several shopping bags. The reporter asks her where she got the bags from. The woman points to her boyfriend, who shrugs. The music video then shows several scenes of women on shopping sprees while their partners fall unconscious after their credit cards are taken from them.

== Track listing ==
1. "Shopping Bags (She Got From You) (Album Version)" - 3:57
2. "The Grind Date (Dirty Version)" - 3:23
3. "The Grind Date (Acapella)" - 3:20
4. "The Grind Date (Instrumental)" - 3:23

== Release history ==
Region	Date	Format(s)	Label(s)	Ref.
United States	October 4, 2004	Urban contemporary radio	A.O.I., Sanctuary, SRG	
