= Breakadawn =

1993 single by De La Soul

Single by De La Soul

from the album Buhloone Mindstate
- Released: August 31, 1993
- Recorded: 1993
- Genre: Hip hop
- Length: 4:15
- Label: Tommy Boy
- Songwriters: P. Huston; K. Mercer; D. Jolicoeur; V. Mason; R. Jones; W. Robinson; S. Wonder; S. Greene
- Producers: Prince Paul; De La Soul

De La Soul singles chronology
"Millie Pulled a Pistol on Santa/Keepin' the Faith" (1991)	"Breakadawn" (1993)	"Ego Trippin' (Part Two)" (1993)

Music video
- "Breakadawn" on YouTube

"Breakadawn" is a song by American hip hop trio De La Soul, released in August 1993, by Tommy Boy Records, as the lead single from their third album, Buhloone Mindstate (1993). It was a number-one hit on the European Dance Radio Chart, while peaking at number 39 in the UK. The song samples "Quiet Storm" by Smokey Robinson and the intro to Michael Jackson's "I Can't Help It", from his Off the Wall album. Additionally, it samples "Sang and Dance" by The Bar-Kays.

== Critical reception ==
Charles Aaron from Spin wrote, "Posdnuos bobs and weaves his lines like a language poet's funky child, Maseo lifts a soothing sample from Smokey Robinson's 'Quiet Storm', and Trugoy tries to enjoy himself, deep as a depth charge. De La Soul Is Dead's grumpy soul-search lost some hip-hop come-latelies; they oughta slink back."

== Track listing ==
1. "Breakadawn (Vocal Version)" - 4:15
2. "Stickabush" - 1:11
  - Guest Appearance: Dres of Black Sheep
3. "En Focus (Vocal Version)" - 3:15
  - Guest Appearance: Dres of Black Sheep
4. "The Dawn Brings Smoke" - 2:11
5. "Hsubakcits" - 0:15
  - Guest Appearance: Dres of Black Sheep
6. "En Focus (Instrumental)" - 3:15
7. "Breakadawn (Instrumental)" - 4:15

== Charts ==
=== Weekly charts ===
Chart (1993)	Peak Position
Australia (ARIA)	73
Europe (European Dance Radio)	1
New Zealand (Recorded Music NZ)	15
UK Singles (Official Charts)	39
UK Airplay (Music Week)	20
UK Club Chart (Music Week)	24
US Billboard Hot 100	76
US Hot R&B/Hip-Hop Songs (Billboard)	30
US Maxi-Singles Sales (Billboard)	1
US Cash Box Top 100	73

=== Year-end charts ===
Chart (1993)	Position
Europe (European Dance Radio)	18
