= Flosstradamus =

American DJ and musician

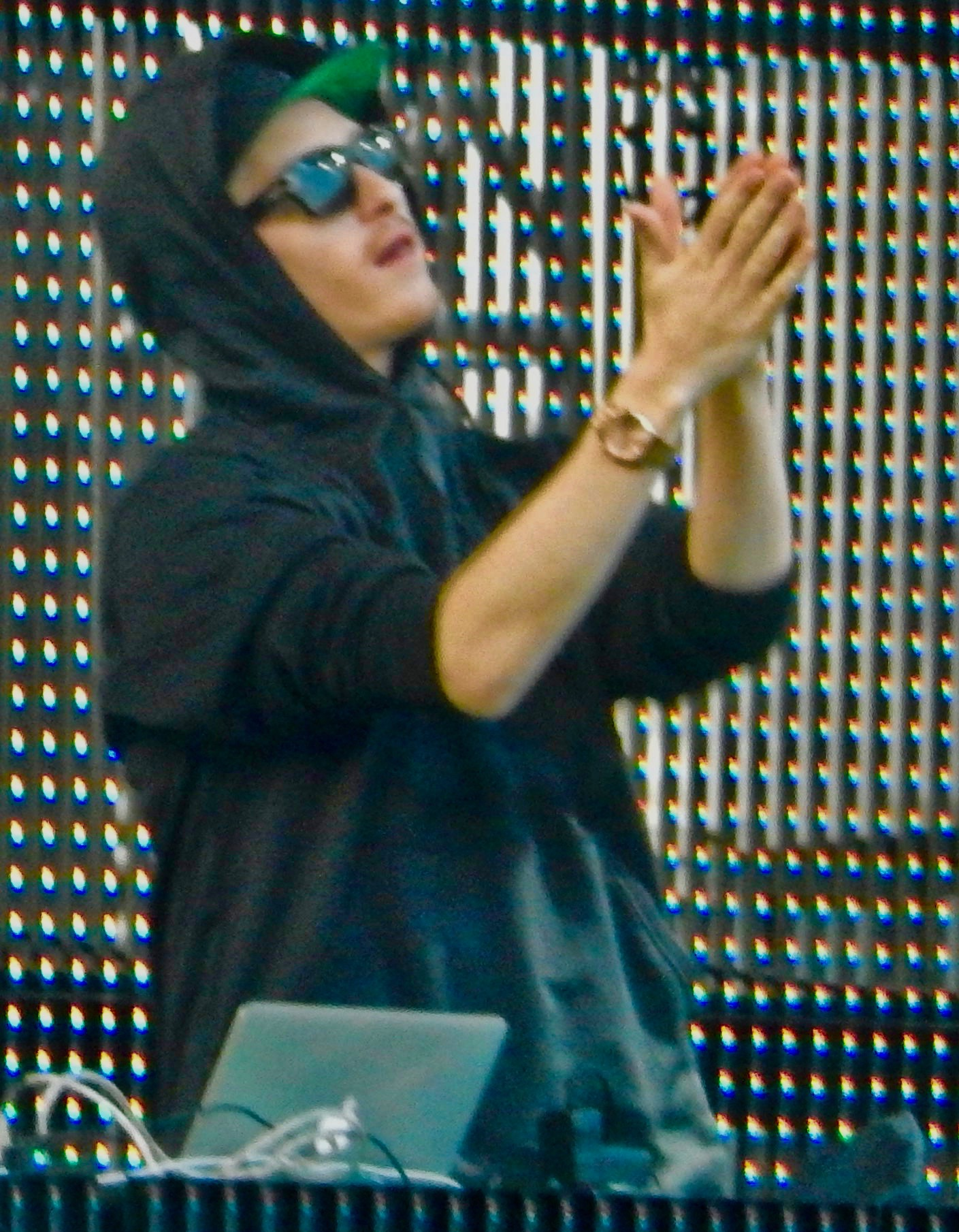
- Cameruci performing in 2013 at Spring Awakening

Background information
- Origin: Chicago, Illinois, United States
- Genres: Trap, hip-hop
- Occupations: Musician; DJ
- Years active: 2006–present
- Members: Curt Cameruci
- Past members: Josh Young

Flosstradamus is the stage name of American DJ and musician Curt Cameruci. From 2007 until 2016, Flosstradamus consisted of Cameruci and Josh Young from Chicago. The duo announced they would both be pursuing solo careers, with Cameruci to continue using Flosstradamus as a stage name. Cameruci is also known as Autobot, and Young is also known as J2K and YehMe2. Flosstradamus is known for being one of the early pioneers of the trap genre, made popular by their remix of Major Lazer's hit single "Original Don".

Flosstradamus, as a duo, have worked alongside artists including Kid Sister (Young's sister), Diplo, Three 6 Mafia's Juicy J, The Cool Kids, and A-Trak. They played at many college campuses such as Wellesley College, Drexel University (alongside Waka Flocka Flame), Northwestern University, Carnegie Mellon University (playing alongside RJD2), Middlebury College, Columbia University, and UC Riverside. They have additionally appeared on Late Night with Jimmy Fallon, and the Nick Jr. program Yo Gabba Gabba!.

== Career ==
In April 2006, Flosstradamus, as a duo, was included in URB's annual "Next 100". In addition, during the summer of 2007, they embarked on an international tour with Chromeo, dubbed the "Fancy Footwork Tour". Autobot is also active in the Serato Scratch Live community making his Flossy FX sampler available online to the masses via their MySpace page. In 2014, at SXSW Flosstradamus set up a guerrilla WiFi network titled PLURNTNET to distribute a new track titled "Hdygrlz Anthm". Using social media the duo pointed fans to the PLURTNET via geotagged posts at various locations around Austin. Users could sign on and download or stream the track.

On July 29, 2016, they released their single 'Came Up' with FKi 1st, graves and featuring Post Malone and Key!. In December 2016, Young announced Flosstradamus was splitting and he would pursue a solo career. Young's solo project soon adopted the name YehMe2. Cameruci would continue with the name Flosstradamus as a solo act. In March 2017 he released the single "Back Again", which featured Waka Flocka Flame and Mayhem through Ultra Music. They have also partnered with Dillon Francis to form the touring and live performance group Dillstradamus.

== Discography ==
=== As a duo ===
==== Singles ====
- 2009: "Big Bills" featuring Caroline Polachek (Green Label)
- 2013: "Assquake"
- 2013: "Look at the Sky"
- 2013: "Hood Fantasy"
- 2013: "Pillz" (with Yellow Claw and Green Velvet)
- 2013: "Mosh Pit" (with Casino)
- 2014: "Drop Top" (with Travis Porter)
- 2014: "TTU (Too Turnt Up)" (with Waka Flocka Flame)
- 2014: "Rebound" (with Elkka)
- 2015: "Prison Riot" (with GTA and Lil Jon)
- 2015: "Soundclash" (with TroyBoi)
- 2016: "Came Up" (with FKi 1st, graves, Post Malone and Key)
- 2017: "Back Again" (with Mayhem and Waka Flocka Flame
- 2017: "How You Gon' Do That" (with Cara)
- 2017: "Tern It Up" (with Dillon Francis)
- 2018: "2 Much" (with 24hrs)
- 2018: "MVP" (with Smokepurpp)
- 2018: "Guava" (with Rawtek)
- 2018: "ID" (with Boombox Cartel)
- 2019: "G.O.D. (Grind or Die)" (with Blvk Jvck featuring Leat'eq)
- 2019: "Bounce Back" (with Megatone)
- 2020: "So Far" (with Nonsens)

==== Extended plays ====
- 2011: Jubilation (Fool's Gold Records)
- 2012: Total Recall (Mad Decent / Jeffrees)
- 2012: Jubilation 2.0 (Fool's Gold Records)
- 2012: XO
- 2013 Nomads (with DJ Sliink)
- 2014 Wake & Bake (with Travis Porter)
- 2014 Plurnt
- 2015 Soundclash (Ultra Records / Fool's Gold Records)
- 2015 Hdynation Radio (Ultra Records)

==== Mixtapes ====
- 2007: Scion Audio/Visual CD Sampler V. 17 (Vice Records)
- 2009: Are You In?: Nike+ Original Run

==== Production ====
- 2011: Toddla T featuring J2K - "Take It Back"
- 2012: Iggy Azalea featuring Juicy J - "Flexin & Finessin"
- 2012: Mykki Blanco - "YungRhymeAssassin"

==== Soundtracks ====
- 2015: Need for Speed - "Don't Trip"

==== Remixes ====
- 2012: Sub Focus - Tidal Wave (Flosstradamus Remix)
- 2013: Flux Pavilion featuring Childish Gambino - Do or Die (Flosstradamus Remix)
- 2014: Young Thug - Stoner (Flosstradamus Remix)
- 2014: Steve Aoki featuring Waka Flocka Flame - Rage the Night Away (Flosstradamus Remix)
- 2015: O.T. Genasis - CoCo (Flosstradamus Remix)
- 2015: Rihanna - Bitch Better Have My Money (Flosstradamus Remix)
- 2015: Major Lazer featuring Bruno Mars, Tyga and Mystic - Bubble Butt (Flosstradamus Remix)
- 2015: Fetty Wap featuring Drake - My Way (Flosstradamus and 4B Remix)
- 2016: Dizzee Rascal and Calvin Harris - Hype (Flosstradamus Remix)
- 2019: Nghtmre featuring ASAP Ferg - Redlight (Flosstradamus Remix)

== In popular culture ==
The musician collaborated with Hemper to create his own smoking accessory box, typically used to consume marijuana. Other musicians such as Ty Dolla $ign, Fetty Wap, and 2Chainz did the same along with Flosstradramus.

Their song, 2 MUCH was used in Forza Horizon 4's Horizon Bass Arena radio station.
