= And the Anonymous Nobody... =

Studio album by De La Soul
- Released: August 26, 2016
- Genre: Hip-hop
- Length: 67:59
- Labels: AOI; Kobalt
- Producers: De La Soul; Jordan Katz; Dave Palmer; Davey Chegwidden; Ethan Phillips; Joshua Matthew Lopez; Kaveh Rastegar; Money Mark; Pete Rock; Supa Dave West

De La Soul chronology
The Grind Date (2004)	And the Anonymous Nobody... (2016)	Cabin in the Sky (2025)

Singles from and the Anonymous Nobody...
- 1. "Trainwreck" Released: April 29, 2016; 2. "Pain" Released: June 1, 2016; 3. "Royalty Capes" Released: July 20, 2016; 4. "Drawn" Released: August 10, 2016; 5. "Greyhounds" Released: August 17, 2016

And the Anonymous Nobody... (stylized as and the Anonymous Nobody...) is the eighth studio album by American hip-hop group De La Soul, the group's first full-length album since The Grind Date and its last prior to group member Trugoy the Dove's death in 2023. It was released on August 26, 2016, on AOI Records, executive produced by Jordan Katz. The group announced the track list on May 20, 2016.

The album has guest features from 2 Chainz, Damon Albarn, David Byrne, Estelle, Little Dragon, Snoop Dogg, Jill Scott, Justin Hawkins, Pete Rock, and Roc Marciano. It received positive reviews by critics, and peaked at 12 on the Billboard 200. The album was nominated for Best Rap Album at the 2017 Grammy Awards.

== Background ==
In early 2015, De La Soul created a Kickstarter in order to fund the album. In under ten hours, it surpassed the projected goal of $110,000. Initially, the group announced that the album would be released on April 29, 2016. Subsequently, releasing a new EP titled For Your Pain & Suffering on April 29, 2016, the group rescheduled the release of the album for August 26, 2016. The first single, "Pain" (featuring Snoop Dogg), was released on May 31, 2016.

== Critical reception ==
Professional ratings
Aggregate scores
Source	Rating
Metacritic	77/100
Review scores
Source	Rating
AllMusic	3/5 stars
The A.V. Club	A−
Consequence of Sound	B−
Drowned in Sound	8/10
Exclaim!	8/10
musicOMH	4/5 stars
Pitchfork	6.4/10
Q	4/5 stars
Spin	8/10
XXL	4/5 stars

At Metacritic, which assigns a normalized rating out of 100 to reviews from mainstream critics, the album received an average score of 77, based on 28 reviews, which indicates "generally favorable reviews". Writing for Exclaim!, Kyle Mullin gave the album a rave review, calling it "one of the most thrilling, wide-ranging rap releases of the year."

== Commercial performance ==
In the United States, And the Anonymous Nobody... debuted at number 12 on the Billboard 200, with 23,000 album-equivalent units, marking the fifth highest debut of the week. It was the seventh best-selling album of the week, selling 21,000 copies in its first week. And the Anonymous Nobody... was the first De La Soul album to debut at number one on the Billboard Top Rap Albums. The album was also streamed 2 million times in the first week. It was nominated at the 59th Grammy Awards for Best Rap Album.

== Track listing ==
And the Anonymous Nobody... track listing
No.	Title	Producer(s)	Length
1.	"Genesis" (featuring Jill Scott)	The Anonymous Nobodies	1:36
2.	"Royalty Capes"	Plug Too; the Anonymous Nobodies^{[a]}; Davey Chegwidden^{[a]}	3:46
3.	"Pain" (featuring Snoop Dogg)	Supa Dave West; De La Soul^{[a]}	4:39
4.	"Property of Spitkicker.com" (featuring Roc Marciano)	Plug Too; the Anonymous Nobodies^{[a]}	5:32
5.	"Memory of… (Us)" (featuring Estelle and Pete Rock)	Pete Rock; De La Soul^{[a]}; West^{[a]}	4:55
6.	"CBGB's"	Plug Too; Ethan Phillips^{[a]}	1:20
7.	"Lord Intended" (featuring Justin Hawkins)	The Anonymous Nobodies; Joshua Matthew Lopez^{[a]}	7:16
8.	"Snoopies" (by De La Soul and David Byrne)	Plug Won; West^{[a]}; Lopez^{[a]}; Money Mark^{[a]}; Chegwidden^{[a]}	4:15
9.	"Greyhounds" (featuring Usher)	Phillips; the Anonymous Nobodies^{[a]}; Chegwidden^{[a]}	5:26
10.	"Sexy Bitch"	Plug Won	1:31
11.	"Trainwreck"	West; the Anonymous Nobodies^{[a]}	3:17
12.	"Drawn" (featuring Little Dragon)	The Anonymous Nobodies; Dave Palmer^{[a]}; Kaveh Rastegar^{[a]}; Chegwidden^{[a]}	5:33
13.	"Whoodeeni" (featuring 2 Chainz)	Plug Too	4:31
14.	"Nosed Up"	West	3:57
15.	"You Go Dave (A Goldblatt Presentation)" (featuring David Goldblatt)	Chegwidden; Phillips; the Anonymous Nobodies^{[a]}	1:20
16.	"Here in After" (featuring Damon Albarn)	The Anonymous Nobodies; Rastegar^{[a]}; Lopez^{[a]}; Chegwidden^{[a]}	5:41
17.	"Exodus"	The Anonymous Nobodies	3:24
Total length:			67:59

Notes

- On the Kickstarter Exclusive CD, LP and digital editions of the album, "You Go Dave (A Goldblatt Presentation)" contains an additional track, "Unfold", after it, running for 6:00.
- ^{^a} signifies a co-producer

== Charts ==
=== Weekly charts ===
Chart (2016)	Peak position
Australian Albums (ARIA)	25
Austrian Albums (Ö3 Austria)	34
Belgian Albums (Ultratop Flanders)	14
Belgian Albums (Ultratop Wallonia)	31
Canadian Albums (Billboard)	51
Dutch Albums (Album Top 100)	19
French Albums (SNEP)	53
German Albums (Offizielle Top 100)	22
Irish Albums (IRMA)	34
New Zealand Albums (RMNZ)	31
Scottish Albums (Official Charts)	14
Swiss Albums (Schweizer Hitparade)	12
UK Albums (Official Charts)	16
UK Official Vinyl Albums (OCC)	1
UK R&B Albums (Official Charts)	2
US Billboard 200	12
US Top R&B/Hip-Hop Albums (Billboard)	3
US Vinyl Albums (Billboard)	1

=== Year-end charts ===
Chart (2016)	Peak position
US Top R&B/Hip-Hop Albums (Billboard)	66
