= Buhloone Mindstate =

Studio album by De La Soul
- Released: September 21, 1993
- Studios: Sorcerer; Magic Shop; Unique
- Genres: Hip hop; jazz rap
- Length: 48:14
- Labels: Tommy Boy; Warner Bros.
- Producers: De La Soul; Prince Paul

De La Soul chronology
| De La Soul Is Dead (1991) | Buhloone Mindstate (1993) | Clear Lake Audiotorium (1994) |

Singles from Buhloone Mindstate
- 1. "Breakadawn" Released: August 31, 1993; 2. "Ego Trippin' (Part Two)" Released: 1994

Buhloone Mindstate is the third studio album by American hip hop group De La Soul. It was released on September 21, 1993, through Tommy Boy Records, and was the group's last record to be produced with Prince Paul.

== Title ==
Buhloone is a phonetic spelling of the English noun "balloon". Posdnuos described the title as meaning "we're popular but not trying to make pop music." This theme is laid out in the intro track, which starts with the sound of a balloon being inflated; then the hookline "it might blow up, but it won't go pop" is repeated over and over, until the sound of a balloon popping replaces the final word "pop".

== Songs and guests ==
De La Soul continued its early- to mid-1990s experimentations with jazz by featuring jazz veterans Maceo Parker, Fred Wesley, and Pee Wee Ellis, on the songs "Patti Dooke" and "I Am I Be". "Patti Dooke" deals with what the group sees as the mainstream's efforts to control the direction of black music. Posdnuos raps:

I'm known as the farmer
Cultivatin' mate without mendin'
Bendin', compromising any of my styles to gain a smile
Listen while you hear it
There's no pink in my slip
I reckon that the rhythm and the blues in the rap got me red
While the boys from Tommy playing bridge crossin' to a larger community
Yet they're soon to see I have a brother named Luck

The Japanese rappers Scha Dara Parr and Takagi Kan make an appearance on "Long Island Wildin'", while Biz Markie appears on "Stone Age", and Guru does the spoken chorus of "Patti Dooke". Dres of Black Sheep appears on "En Focus", and the album heavily features Shortie No Mass. The album was preceded by the single and video "Breakadawn", which features samples from Michael Jackson's "I Can't Help It" and Smokey Robinson's "A Quiet Storm".

== Reception ==
Professional ratings
Initial reviews (in 1993)
Review scores
| Source | Rating |
|---|---|
| Chicago Sun-Times | 4/4 stars |
| Chicago Tribune | 3.5/4 stars |
| Christgau's Consumer Guide | A |
| Entertainment Weekly | A+ |
| Music Week | 3/5 stars |
| NME | 8/10 |
| Select | 3/5 medals |
| The Source | 4.5/5 stars |

Professional ratings
Retrospective reviews (after 1993)
Review scores
| Source | Rating |
|---|---|
| AllMusic | 3.5/5 stars |
| Pitchfork | 9.1/10 |
| The Rolling Stone Album Guide | 4.5/5 stars |
| Spin Alternative Record Guide | 8/10 |

At the end of 1993, Buhloone Mindstate was voted the eighth best album of the year in the Pazz & Jop, an annual poll of American critics nationwide, published by The Village Voice. Robert Christgau, the poll's creator and supervisor, ranked it fifth best on his own year-end list. In a contemporary review, Rolling Stone critic Paul Evans said the record was more focused than De La Soul's previous albums and also more ambitious sonically: "Musically, Buhloone Mindstate raises the stakes; it gets to something rap seldom achieves – a truly gorgeous groove." In 2005, comedian Chris Rock named it the 10th greatest hip hop record of all time in a list published by Rolling Stone.

== Track listing ==
All tracks are written by K. Mercer, D. Jolicoeur, V. Mason, P. Huston, except where noted.

Buhloone Mindstate track listing
| No. | Title | Writer(s) | Length |
|---|---|---|---|
| 1. | "Intro" | K. Mercer; D. Jolicouer; V. Mason; P. Huston; L. Dickens | 0:52 |
| 2. | "Eye Patch" | | 2:27 |
| 3. | "En Focus" (featuring Shortie No Mass and Dres of Black Sheep) | | 3:15 |
| 4. | "Patti Dooke" (featuring Guru, Maceo Parker, Fred Wesley and Pee Wee Ellis) | | 5:54 |
| 5. | "I Be Blowin'" (featuring Maceo Parker) | | 4:58 |
| 6. | "Long Island Wildin'" (featuring Scha Dara Parr and Takagi Kan) | | 1:30 |
| 7. | "Ego Trippin' (Part Two)" | | 3:52 |
| 8. | "Paul's Revenge" | | 0:43 |
| 9. | "3 Days Later" | K. Mercer; D. Jolicouer; V. Mason; P. Huston; A. Snyder; T. George | 2:39 |
| 10. | "Area" | | 3:31 |
| 11. | "I Am I Be" (featuring Maceo Parker, Fred Wesley and Pee Wee Ellis) | K. Mercer; D. Jolicouer; V. Mason; P. Huston; B. Gordy; B. Davis; F. Wilson; P. Holloway | 5:03 |
| 12. | "In the Woods" (featuring Shortie No Mass) | | 4:01 |
| 13. | "Breakadawn" | K. Mercer; D. Jolicouer; V. Mason; P. Huston; R. Jones; W. Robinson; S. Wonder; S. Greene | 4:14 |
| 14. | "Dave Has a Problem...Seriously" | | 0:55 |
| 15. | "Stone Age" (featuring Biz Markie) | | 4:13 |

30th anniversary bonus tracks
| No. | Title | Length |
|---|---|---|
| 16. | "Sh.Fe.MC's" (featuring A Tribe Called Quest) | 4:35 |
| 17. | "Lovely How I Let My Mind Float" (featuring Biz Markie) | 4:05 |
| 18. | "Mindstate" | 3:47 |

== Personnel ==
Technical

- De La Soul – production, mixing
- Prince Paul – production, mixing
- Bob Power – mixing, recording, additional production
- Tim Latham – additional engineer
- Patrick Derivaz – additional engineer
- Gerard Julien – assistant engineer
- Brad Schmidt – assistant engineer
- Chris Flam – assistant engineer
- Ken Quartarone – assistant engineer
- Mikael Ifversen – assistant engineer
- Brian Sperber – assistant engineer
- Eric Gast – assistant engineer
- Joe Warda – assistant engineer
- Hoover Le – assistant engineer

Artwork

- De La Soul – art direction
- Erwin Gorostiza – art direction
- KODE Associates – design
- Guy Aroch – cover photography
- Jerome Duran – additional photography
- Jermaine "Griff Dogg" Griffin – additional photography

== Charts ==
Chart performance for Buhloone Mindstate
| Chart (1993) | Peak position |
|---|---|
| Australian Albums (ARIA) | 120 |
| New Zealand Albums (RMNZ) | 40 |
| UK Albums (Official Charts) | 37 |
| US Billboard 200 | 40 |
| US Top R&B/Hip-Hop Albums (Billboard) | 9 |

2023 chart performance for Buhloone Mindstate
| Chart (2023) | Peak position |
|---|---|
| Scottish Albums (Official Charts) | 54 |
| UK Independent Albums (Official Charts) | 25 |
