= Stakes Is High =

Studio album by De La Soul
- Released: July 2, 1996
- Genre: East Coast hip hop
- Length: 68:19
- Labels: Tommy Boy; Warner Bros.
- Producers: De La Soul; Spearhead X; Skeff Anselm; O.Gee; Jay Dee

De La Soul chronology
Buhloone Mindstate (1993)	Stakes Is High (1996)	Art Official Intelligence: Mosaic Thump (2000)

Singles from Stakes Is High
- 1. "Stakes Is High" Released: June 17, 1996; 2. "Itzsoweezee (Hot)" Released: 1996; 3. "4 More" Released: 1997

Professional ratings
Review scores
Source	Rating
AllMusic	4/5 stars
Entertainment Weekly	B
Muzik	4.5/5 stars
NME	6/10
RapReviews	10/10
Rolling Stone	2/5 stars
The Rolling Stone Album Guide	4/5 stars
Spin	6/10
Tiny Mix Tapes	4/5 stars
The Village Voice	B+

Stakes Is High is the fourth studio album by American hip hop group De La Soul. It was released on July 2, 1996, through Tommy Boy Records. The album marked a change in the group's sound and direction and was their first without producer Prince Paul. It was produced primarily by De La Soul, with additional production by Jay Dee, DJ Ogee, Spearhead X and Skeff Anselm. The album received generally positive reviews and was a moderate commercial success.

== History ==
Stakes Is High was De La Soul's first album without longtime collaborator Prince Paul. The group felt that the material he submitted did not suit the album's tone.

The album addresses the state of hip hop, the commercialization of hip hop culture and gangsta rap. Rapper 2Pac later responded on "Against All Odds", from his posthumous 1996 album The Don Killuminati: The 7 Day Theory, and on the unreleased song "Watch Ya Mouth", recorded during the same sessions. Naughty By Nature member Treach also objected to the album, leading to a feud that subsided about 15 years after its release.

The album helped introduce rapper Mos Def to a wider audience through his appearance on "Big Brother Beat". Common also appears on "The Bizness".

After the album's release, De La Soul toured extensively. Their next studio album, Art Official Intelligence: Mosaic Thump, was released in 2000 as the first installment in the Art Official Intelligence series.

A 30th-anniversary edition was announced in July 2026 and released on October 23, 2026. It includes instrumental tracks and additional songs.

=== Interludes ===
The album's interludes reflect the group's concerns about the state of rap and public perceptions of hip hop culture. The opening track features interview excerpts in which participants recall where they were when they first heard Criminal Minded. At the end of track 9, "Long Island Degrees", a man expresses his dislike of rap music using a racial slur. Track 10, "Betta Listen", ends with Posdnuos and Maseo discussing a miscommunication about a club.

At the end of track 15, "Pony Ride", an excerpt from the documentary Crumb features Maxon Crumb discussing his experiences living on the streets and alternating periods of optimism and depression. He remarks, "Stakes is high". The beginning and end of track 16, "Stakes Is High", feature recordings of people playing dice while a man nearby discusses the O. J. Simpson trials.

The final track, "Sunshine", ends with a young man saying, "Yo, when I first heard 3 Feet High and Rising, I was", before the recording cuts off. The interruption resembles the use of "Fight the Power" on Public Enemy's Fear of a Black Planet. The reference to De La Soul's debut album, 3 Feet High and Rising, echoes the discussion of Criminal Minded in the opening track.

== Critical reception ==
Robert Christgau wrote: "After almost four years, Posdnuos and company emerge from the ether like the long-lost friends they are. Their wordplay assured in its subtle smarts, their delivery unassuming in its quick, unmacho mumble, their cultural awareness never smug about its balance, they bind up an identifiable feeling in an identifiable sound, and just about every one of the 17 tracks comes equipped with a solid beat and a likable hook or chorus. It's a relief to have them back. But it's never a revelation."

== Track listing ==
Original release
No.	Title	Writer(s)	Producer(s)	Length
1.	"Intro"	Kelvin Mercer; David Jolicoeur; Vincent Mason	De La Soul	2:35
2.	"Supa Emcees"	Mercer; Jolicoeur; Mason	De La Soul	3:40
3.	"The Bizness" (featuring Common Sense)	Mercer; Jolicoeur; Mason; Lonnie Lynn	De La Soul	5:41
4.	"Wonce Again Long Island"	Mercer; Jolicoeur; Mason	De La Soul	3:39
5.	"Dinninit"	Mercer; Jolicoeur; Mason; Xavier Hargrove; Milt Jackson	Spearhead X	4:20
6.	"Brakes"	Mercer; Jolicoeur; Mason; Reggie Hodby; Charlie Jimenez; Lawrence Mack	De La Soul	4:06
7.	"Dog Eat Dog"	Mercer; Jolicoeur; Mason	De La Soul	3:40
8.	"Baby Baby Baby Baby Ooh Baby"	Mercer; Jolicoeur; Mason	De La Soul	2:10
9.	"Long Island Degrees"	Mercer; Jolicoeur; Mason	De La Soul	3:27
10.	"Betta Listen"	Mercer; Jolicoeur; Mason	De La Soul	4:28
11.	"Itzsoweezee (Hot)"	Mercer; Jolicoeur; Mason	De La Soul	4:55
12.	"4 More" (featuring Zhané)	Mercer; Jolicoeur; Mason; Gary Scott; Nathaniel Hall; Michael Small; Eric Matthew; Darryl Payne	O. Gee; De La Soul^{[a]}	4:18
13.	"Big Brother Beat" (featuring Mos Def)	Mercer; Jolicoeur; Mason; Dante Beze; Skeff Anselm	Skeff Anselm	3:42
14.	"Down Syndrome"	Mercer; Jolicoeur; Mason	De La Soul	3:28
15.	"Pony Ride" (featuring Truth Enola)	Mercer; Jolicoeur; Mason; Sheddrick Preston	De La Soul	5:26
16.	"Stakes Is High"	Mercer; Jolicoeur; Mason; James Yancey	Jay Dee; De La Soul^{[a]}	5:30
17.	"Sunshine"	Mercer; Jolicoeur; Mason; Lionel Richie; Thomas McClary	De La Soul	3:39
Total length:				68:19

The 30th anniversary edition, released on October 23, 2026, adds remastered audio, instrumental versions, remixes, and previously unreleased recordings.

30th Anniversary Edition – Disc 1
No.	Title	Writer(s)	Producer(s)	Length
1.	"Intro"	Mercer; Jolicoeur; Mason	De La Soul	2:35
2.	"Supa Emcees"	Mercer; Jolicoeur; Mason	De La Soul	3:40
3.	"The Bizness" (featuring Common Sense)	Mercer; Jolicoeur; Mason; Lynn	De La Soul	4:22
4.	"Yunonstop"			1:16
5.	"Wonce Again Long Island"	Mercer; Jolicoeur; Mason	De La Soul	3:38
6.	"Dinninit"	Mercer; Jolicoeur; Mason; Hargrove; Jackson	Spearhead X	4:21
7.	"Brakes"	Mercer; Jolicoeur; Mason; Hodby; Jimenez; Mack	De La Soul	4:06
8.	"Dog Eat Dog"	Mercer; Jolicoeur; Mason	De La Soul	3:38
9.	"Baby Baby Baby Baby Ooh Baby" (featuring Jazzyfatnastees)	Mercer; Jolicoeur; Mason	De La Soul	2:08
10.	"Long Island Degrees"	Mercer; Jolicoeur; Mason	De La Soul	3:27
11.	"Betta Listen"	Mercer; Jolicoeur; Mason	De La Soul	4:27
12.	"Itzsoweezee (Hot)"	Mercer; Jolicoeur; Mason	De La Soul	4:48
13.	"4 More" (featuring Zhané)	Mercer; Jolicoeur; Mason; Scott; Hall; Small; Matthew; Payne	O. Gee; De La Soul^{[a]}	4:18
14.	"Big Brother Beat" (featuring Mos Def)	Mercer; Jolicoeur; Mason; Beze; Anselm	Skeff Anselm	3:43
15.	"Down Syndrome"	Mercer; Jolicoeur; Mason	De La Soul	3:04
16.	"Pony Ride" (featuring Truth Enola)	Mercer; Jolicoeur; Mason; Preston	De La Soul	5:27
17.	"Stakes Is High"	Mercer; Jolicoeur; Mason; Yancey	Jay Dee; De La Soul^{[a]}	5:30
18.	"Sunshine"	Mercer; Jolicoeur; Mason; Richie; McClary	De La Soul	3:40
Total length:				68:08

30th Anniversary Edition – Disc 2
No.	Title	Writer(s)	Producer(s)	Length
1.	"Intro (Instrumental Edit)"	Mercer; Jolicoeur; Mason	De La Soul	1:22
2.	"Supa Emcees (Instrumental Edit)"	Mercer; Jolicoeur; Mason	De La Soul	2:06
3.	"The Bizness (Instrumental Edit)"	Mercer; Jolicoeur; Mason; Lynn	De La Soul	2:17
4.	"Yunonstop (Instrumental Edit)"			0:56
5.	"Wonce Again Long Island (Instrumental Edit)"	Mercer; Jolicoeur; Mason	De La Soul	2:11
6.	"Dinninit (Instrumental Edit)"	Mercer; Jolicoeur; Mason; Hargrove; Jackson	Spearhead X	2:25
7.	"Brakes (Instrumental Edit)"	Mercer; Jolicoeur; Mason; Hodby; Jimenez; Mack	De La Soul	2:40
8.	"Dog Eat Dog (Instrumental Edit)"	Mercer; Jolicoeur; Mason	De La Soul	2:15
9.	"Baby Baby Baby Baby Ooh Baby (Instrumental Edit)"	Mercer; Jolicoeur; Mason	De La Soul	2:01
10.	"Long Island Degrees (Instrumental Edit)"	Mercer; Jolicoeur; Mason	De La Soul	2:25
11.	"Betta Listen (Instrumental Edit)"	Mercer; Jolicoeur; Mason	De La Soul	2:22
12.	"Itzsoweezee (Hot) (Instrumental Edit)"	Mercer; Jolicoeur; Mason	De La Soul	2:23
13.	"4 More (Instrumental Edit)"	Mercer; Jolicoeur; Mason; Scott; Hall; Small; Matthew; Payne	O. Gee; De La Soul^{[a]}	1:58
14.	"Big Brother Beat (Instrumental Edit)"	Mercer; Jolicoeur; Mason; Beze; Anselm	Skeff Anselm	2:37
15.	"Down Syndrome (Instrumental Edit)"	Mercer; Jolicoeur; Mason	De La Soul	2:05
16.	"Pony Ride (Instrumental Edit)"	Mercer; Jolicoeur; Mason; Preston	De La Soul	2:30
17.	"Stakes Is High (Instrumental)"	Mercer; Jolicoeur; Mason; Yancey	Jay Dee; De La Soul^{[a]}	4:39
18.	"Sunshine (Instrumental Edit)"	Mercer; Jolicoeur; Mason; Richie; McClary	De La Soul	2:12
19.	"Chanel No. Fever"			3:23
20.	"I Can't Call It"			3:28
21.	"Itzsoweezee (Hot) (De La Soul Remix)" (featuring Yankee B.)	Mercer; Jolicoeur; Mason	De La Soul	4:38
22.	"Stakes Is High (J Dilla Remix)" (featuring Mos Def and Truth Enola)	Mercer; Jolicoeur; Mason; Yancey	Jay Dee	4:49
23.	"Stakes Is High (J Dilla Alternate Remix)"	Mercer; Jolicoeur; Mason; Yancey	Jay Dee	4:40
Total length:				62:22

Notes

- ^{^[a]} indicates an additional producer.
- "Baby Baby Baby Baby Ooh Baby" features additional vocals by the Jazzyfatnastees.
- The streaming version of the album divides "The Bizness" into two tracks, "The Bizness" and "Yunonstop".

== Charts ==
=== Weekly charts ===
Chart (1996)	Peak position
Australian Albums (ARIA)	105
Dutch Albums (Album Top 100)	68
German Albums (Offizielle Top 100)	91
New Zealand Albums (RMNZ)	45
Swedish Albums (Sverigetopplistan)	67
UK Albums (Official Charts)	42
UK R&B Albums (Official Charts)	5
US Billboard 200	13
US Top R&B/Hip-Hop Albums (Billboard)	4

Chart (2023)	Peak position
Scottish Albums (Official Charts)	82
UK Independent Albums (Official Charts)	15
UK R&B Albums (Official Charts)	1

=== Year-end charts ===
Chart (1996)	Position
US Top R&B/Hip-Hop Albums (Billboard)	74
