= The Grind Date =

Studio album by De La Soul
- Released: October 5, 2004
- Genre: Hip hop
- Length: 52:43
- Labels: AOI; Sanctuary Urban
- Producers: Posdnuos; Supa Dave West; J Dilla; Madlib; 9th Wonder; Jake One

De La Soul chronology
AOI: Bionix (2001)	The Grind Date (2004)	And the Anonymous Nobody... (2016)

Singles from The Grind Date
- 1. "Shoomp/Much More" Released: 2003; 2. "Shopping Bags (She Got From You)" Released: 2004; 3. "Rock Co.Kane Flow" Released: 2004

The Grind Date is the seventh studio album by American hip hop group De La Soul, released on October 5, 2004. The album was originally intended to be the final album of the Art Official Intelligence (AOI) trilogy, but as the album quickly changed focus, the group decided to put AOI III on hold and finish The Grind Date as a stand-alone work.

== Music ==
The Grind Date is a notably brisker, and leaner work than the group's previous albums, and features a top-of-the-line array of production talents including the late J Dilla (who was part of A Tribe Called Quest's production unit, The Ummah), Madlib ("Shopping Bags (She Got From You)"), and 9th Wonder ("Church"). Producer Supa Dave West, who handled the majority of the AOI albums, also contributes five tracks to the album. "Rock Co.Kane Flow" featuring MF Doom, was produced by Jake One, and sees Posdnuos addressing some recent trends in Hip hop with the line "Unlike them, we craft gems / so systematically inclined to pen lines / without sayin a producer's name, all over the track". The well received collaboration also brought attention to the then-unknown Jake One.

The album is light on guest appearances and features a total of four guest MCs, including Common. Unlike every De La Soul album before it, The Grind Date contains no skits at all, although a short musical prelude does precede the first song "The Future". The album's conceptual cover and sleeve booklet, based on a 2005 calendar, was designed by Morning Breath Inc.

In November 2014, The Grind Date was reissued by BMG Rights Management to commemorate the album's tenth anniversary.

== Critical reception ==
Professional ratings
Aggregate scores
Source	Rating
Metacritic	80/100
Review scores
Source	Rating
AllHipHop	4.5/5 stars
AllMusic	3.5/5 stars
HipHopDX	4/5 stars
Los Angeles Times	3/4 stars
Pitchfork	8.2/10
RapReviews	10/10
Rolling Stone	2/5 stars
Tiny Mix Tapes	4.5/5 stars
USA Today	3.5/4 stars
Vibe	4/5 stars

As of February 25, 2008, according to Metacritic, the album has received an average critic score of 80%, based on 21 reviews, thus giving it the "generally favorable reviews" tag.

Pitchfork writer Jamin Warren praises the album writing, "The Grind Date brings together an unimaginable team of the underground's hottest producers and meshes their idiosyncrasies without dissidence." Steve Juon of RapReviews.com who rewarded the album with a perfect score wrote, "They were just waiting for the right time to kick precisely the right rhyme, so that "The Grind Date" would go down not just as an important date in rap history but in the pantheon of all musical endeavours since the dawn of mankind. It's that damn good."

De La Soul, previously known for their skits, gained a lot of support from Stylus Magazine writer Josh Drimmer who wrote, "The Grind Date is as notable for what it lacks—skits, filler, bullshit—than for what it has." Dan Filowitz of Lost At Sea also favored the no skits on The Grind Date, "The Grind Date is almost shockingly excellent. This is De La Soul at their most focused – no skits, no filler, no weird interludes." Fiore Raymond of Entertainment Weekly gave the album a B+ and called it "worth keeping", while Robert Christgau gave it a one-star honorable mention.

Despite generally favorable reviews and positivity towards their new style, especially in production, there were those who didn't praise it. Peter Relic of Rolling Stone wrote, "There's little personality and no surprises here..." and regards to the production "...Flavor Flav's rote shucking on "Come On Down" to Madlib's Chingy-type beat for "Shopping Bags.""

Pitchfork placed the album at number 31 on the "Top 50 Albums of 2004" list.

== Track listing ==
All tracks are written by Kelvin Mercer, David Jolicoeur, and Vincent Mason, with additional writers noted (excluding "Doo Good in Church", written by Troy Hightower).

No.	Title	Writer(s)	Producer(s)	Length
1.	"The Future"	Dave West; Eddie Fluellen; Hazel Jackson; Jermaine Jackson	Supa Dave West	3:49
2.	"Verbal Clap"	James Yancey; Rick Wakeman; Leslie West; Felix Pappalardi; Norman Landsberg; John Ventura; Daryl Short; Royland Fowler; Bernard Fowler	J Dilla	3:16
3.	"Much More" (featuring Yummy Bingham and DJ Premier)	Yancey; Skip Scarborough; Shuggie Otis; Leslie Weinstein	J Dilla	4:05
4.	"Shopping Bags (She Got from You)" (featuring Daniel Wallace)	Otis Jackson Jr.	Madlib	3:57
5.	"The Grind Date" (featuring Bönz Malone)	West; Jon Anderson; Steve Howe; Chris Squire; Rick Wakeman; Alan White	Supa Dave West	3:22
6.	"Church" (featuring Spike Lee)	Patrick Douthit; Marlon McClain	9th Wonder	5:32
7.	"It's Like That" (featuring Carl Thomas)	West; Carl Thomas	Supa Dave West	4:36
8.	"He Comes" (featuring Ghostface Killah)	West; Dennis Coles; Eugene Record	Supa Dave West	3:44
9.	"Days of Our Lives" (featuring Common)	Lonnie Lynn; Jacob Dutton; Leroy Bonner; William Beck; Marshall Jones; Ralph Middlebrooks; Marvin Pierce; Clarence Satchell; James Williams	Jake One	3:51
10.	"Come On Down" (featuring Flavor Flav)	Jackson Jr.	Madlib	5:01
11.	"No" (featuring Butta Verses and Yummy Bingham)	West; John Cullen; Clifton Davis	Supa Dave West	4:34
12.	"Rock Co.Kane Flow" (featuring MF Doom)	Dutton; Daniel Dumile; Paul Greedos; Didier Marouani; Roland Romanelli	Jake One	3:06
Total length:				48:54

European edition / Japanese edition bonus track
No.	Title	Writer(s)	Producer(s)	Length
13.	"Shoomp" (featuring Sean Paul)	Yancey; Sean Henriques; Adrian Belew; Chris Frantz; Steven Stanley; Tina Weymouth	J Dilla	3:41
Total length:				52:40

20th anniversary edition bonus tracks
No.	Title	Writer(s)	Producer(s)	Length
7.	"Doo Good in Church" (Skit)	Troy Hightower	De La Soul	5:29
15.	"Bigger" (featuring Choklate)	Kolesta Moore; Kenneth Cheney; Derrick Brown	Vitamin D	4:49
16.	"Respect"	West; Kerry Livgren; Steve Walsh	Supa Dave West	4:15
Total length:				67:13

== Charts ==
Chart	Peak position
French Albums (SNEP)	148
Swiss Albums (Schweizer Hitparade)	89
US Billboard 200	87
US Top R&B/Hip-Hop Albums (Billboard)	17
