= De La Soul =

American hip hop group

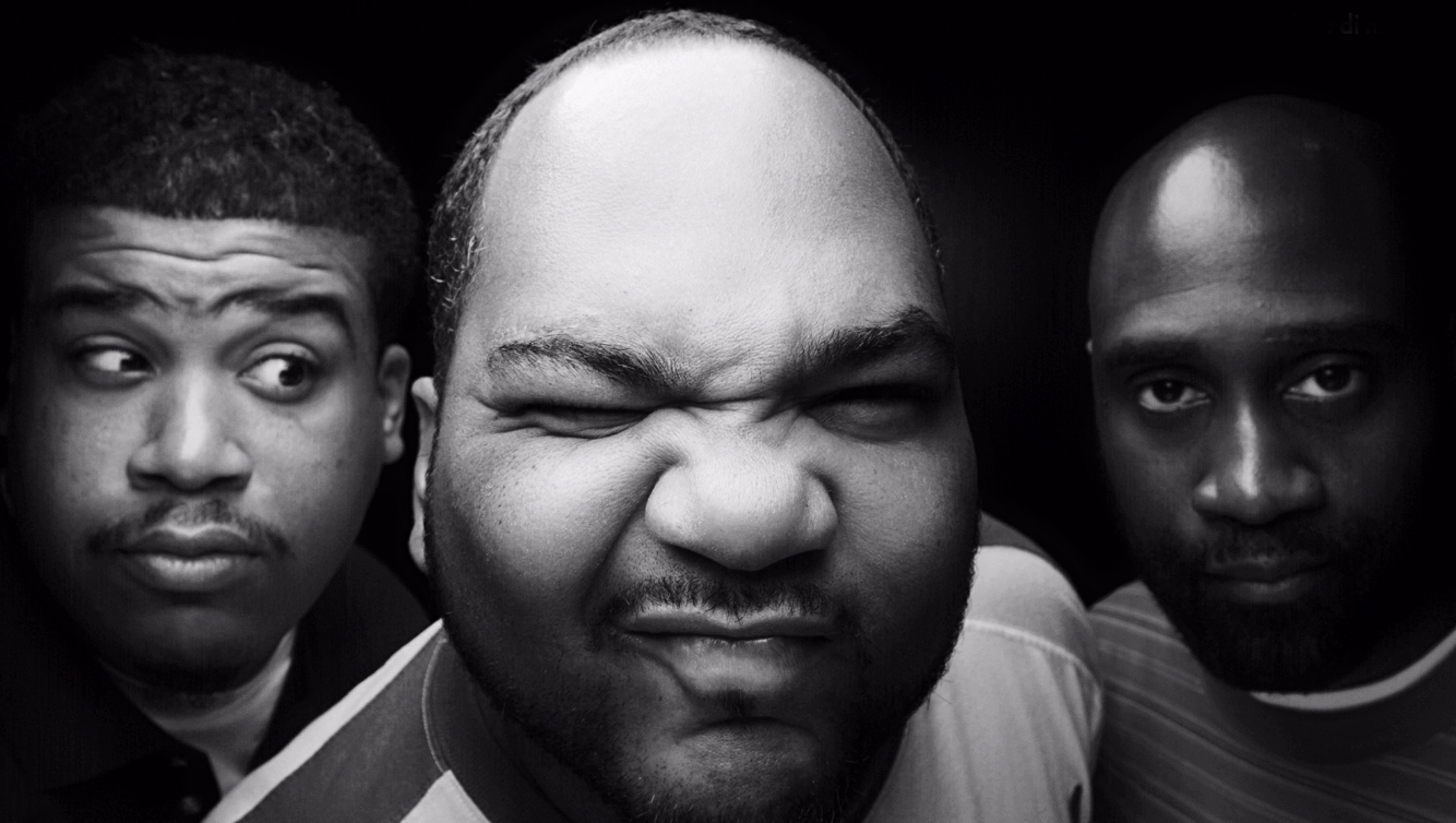
- De La Soul in 2004. L–R: Trugoy the Dove, Maseo and Posdnuos.

Background information
- Origin: Amityville, New York, U.S.
- Genres: East Coast hip-hop; alternative hip-hop; progressive rap; jazz rap; golden age hip-hop
- Works: De La Soul discography
- Years active: 1988–present
- Labels: Tommy Boy; Sanctuary; Kobalt; Duck Down; PIAS; Mass Appeal
- Members: Posdnuos; Maseo
- Past members: Trugoy the Dove
- Website: wearedelasoul.com

De La Soul (/ˌdeɪ lɑː ˈsoʊl/ DAY lah SOHL) is an American hip-hop group formed in the village of Amityville on Long Island, New York, in 1988. They are best known for their eclectic sampling, eccentric lyrics, and contributions to the evolution of the jazz rap and alternative hip-hop subgenres. Kelvin "Posdnuos" Mercer, David "Trugoy the Dove" Jolicoeur, and Vincent "Maseo" Mason formed the group in high school and caught the attention of producer Prince Paul with a demonstration tape of the song "Plug Tunin' ".

The group's debut album, 3 Feet High and Rising (1989), has been called "a hip-hop masterpiece". It remains their biggest commercial success, though subsequent albums have continued to receive acclaim. De La Soul is the second Native Tongues group after the Jungle Brothers. In 2006, the group won a Grammy for their collaboration with Gorillaz on their single "Feel Good Inc."

The group has released 10 studio albums and one live album between 1989 and 2025. Their catalog was not available on audio streaming services or digital media stores until 2023 due to contractual disputes and copyright clearances for their extensive sampling. Trugoy the Dove died in 2023.

== History ==
=== 1989–1993: 3 Feet High and Rising and De La Soul Is Dead ===
De La Soul's debut album, 3 Feet High and Rising, released in 1989, was a critical smash hit in the hip-hop genre. They quickly became prominent members of the Native Tongues Posse along with A Tribe Called Quest, Black Sheep, Queen Latifah, and the Jungle Brothers, among others. The single "Me Myself and I" became a huge hit, further cementing the group's popularity. However, '60s pop group the Turtles sued De La Soul for using a sample from their 1969 hit "You Showed Me" for the interlude track "Transmitting Live from Mars".

Lyrically, much of 3 Feet High and Rising focused on striving for peace and harmony. The album also introduced De La Soul's concept of the "D.A.I.S.Y. Age" (an acronym standing for "da inner sound, y'all"). As a result, audiences were quick to peg the members of De La Soul as hippies. This stereotype greatly agitated the group's members, as they always envisioned their career as a constantly changing style; this frustration would influence their next recording sessions. In the press kit for 3 Feet High and Rising, the members explained their stage names: Trugoy when reversed spells yogurt, because he liked yogurt, and Posdnuos spelled backwards is "sound sop". The album artwork was designed by radical British artist collective the Grey Organisation.

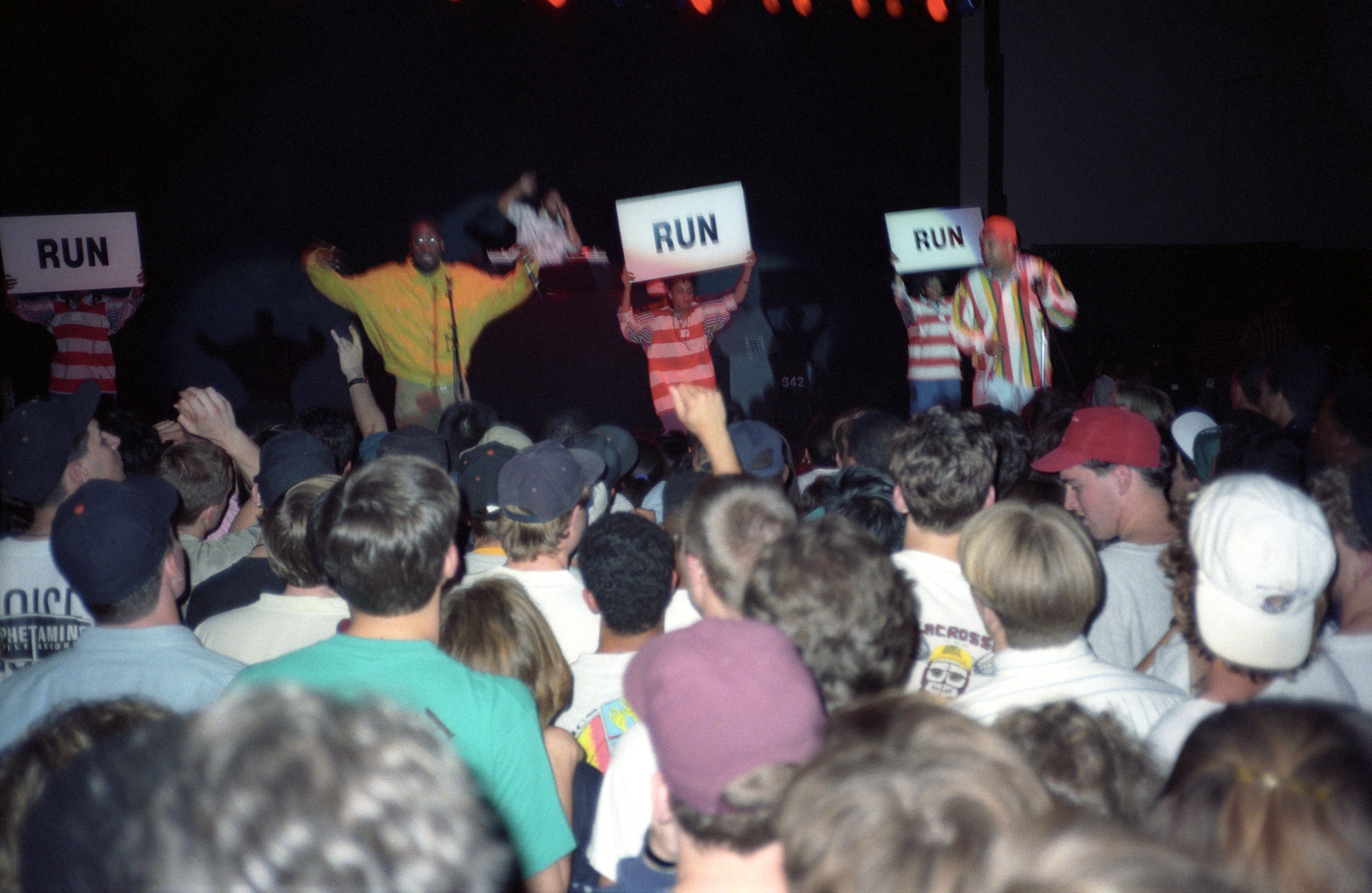
De La Soul performing at the Dillon Gymnasium in 1991

De La Soul's second album, De La Soul Is Dead (1991), was a much more mature album. It featured a wealth of material that criticized the violent, careless direction in which hip-hop was heading at the time, though it still managed to maintain a light, absurd sense of humor. The cover of the album features a broken daisy flowerpot, symbolizing the death of the "D.A.I.S.Y. Age" and the imagery that went along with it. The album spawned several singles, including the dark "Millie Pulled a Pistol on Santa", a tale of a young girl who could no longer take the sexual abuse from her father, and the lead single "Ring Ring Ring (Ha Ha Hey)", a story about people using the group's recent fame to try to launch their own careers.

De La Soul collaborated with Black Sheep on "Fanatic of the B Word" and Q-Tip from A Tribe Called Quest on "A Roller Skating Jam Named 'Saturdays'"; Prince Paul makes an appearance on the microphone in "Pass the Plugs" with a verse of his own. The album also more prominently featured Maseo as a rapper, providing verses of his own on "Bitties in the BK Lounge", "Afro Connections at a Hi-5", and "Ring Ring Ring (Ha Ha Hey)".

Though it received mixed reviews and did not sell as well as 3 Feet High and Rising, it eventually became a cult classic. The Source listed the album as one of their top 100 hip-hop albums of all time. Initially, the tracks "My Brother's a Basehead", "Kicked Out the House", and "Who Do U Worship?" were only available on the CD. Subsequent vinyl reissues have restored the running order as originally intended.

=== 1993–2000: Buhloone Mindstate and Stakes Is High ===
The group's third studio release, 1993's Buhloone Mindstate, saw the group evolve a new sound as they continued to grow stylistically and musically. Several moments on the album proved the band had matured. "I Be Blowin'" was a departure, as the track was an instrumental featuring saxophone playing by Maceo Parker. The introspective "I Am I Be" showed De La Soul at their most self-referential to date with subject matter about Pos' daughter Ayana Monet, as well as his grandmother. "Long Island Wildin'" was a collaboration with Japanese hip-hop artists Kan Takagi (Major Force) and trio Scha Dara Parr. The album's first single, "Breakadawn", used a sample of Michael Jackson's "I Can't Help It" and Smokey Robinson's "Quiet Storm". De La Soul collaborated for the first time with Gang Starr's Guru on "Patti Dooke", female MC Shortie No Mas, a cousin of Posdnuos', was prominent on many tracks on the album, showcased particularly "In the Woods". The album ended with an old-school Biz Markie collaboration called "Stone Age". Missing from vocal duties is Mase, whose voice can only be heard on "Area" in a break near the end of the track. Also rarely featured is his scratching, which was heard often on previous albums, with only "In the Woods" showcasing his talent in that area. The album was a critical success, but it was the biggest commercial failure for the group at the time of its release. Many publications, such as Rolling Stone, have listed this album as one of the best hip-hop albums of all time.

In 1994, 500 copies of a promotional EP called Clear Lake Audiotorium were released on clear vinyl and CD. The six-track EP contained edited versions of tracks from Buhloone Mindstate, but also featured the tracks "Sh.Fe.MC's" (Shocking Female MC's), which was a collaboration with A Tribe Called Quest, and "Stix & Stonz", which featured old-school hip-hop artists Grandmaster Caz, Tito of Fearless Four, Whipper Whip, LA Sunshine, and Superstar. The EP was widely bootlegged afterwards.

Stakes Is High (1996) was the first album not produced by Prince Paul, with overall production credits given solely to the trio. Although it was met with poor sales, it has been critically lauded for its music, lyricism, and overall message concerning the artistic decline rap music began to face in the mid-'90s. The title track and first single, produced by J Dilla, was not a hit, but the album's second single, "Itzsoweezee (HOT)", with only Dave on vocals, did fare better due to its creative music video. The album spawned a third single, "4 More", featuring Zhane, which peaked at number 52 in the UK. The album did provide a launching pad for future star rapper and actor Mos Def, who appeared on the track "Big Brother Beat". The album also featured collaborations with Common, Truth Enola, and the Jazzyfatnastees.

=== 2000–2005: Art Official Intelligence and The Grind Date ===
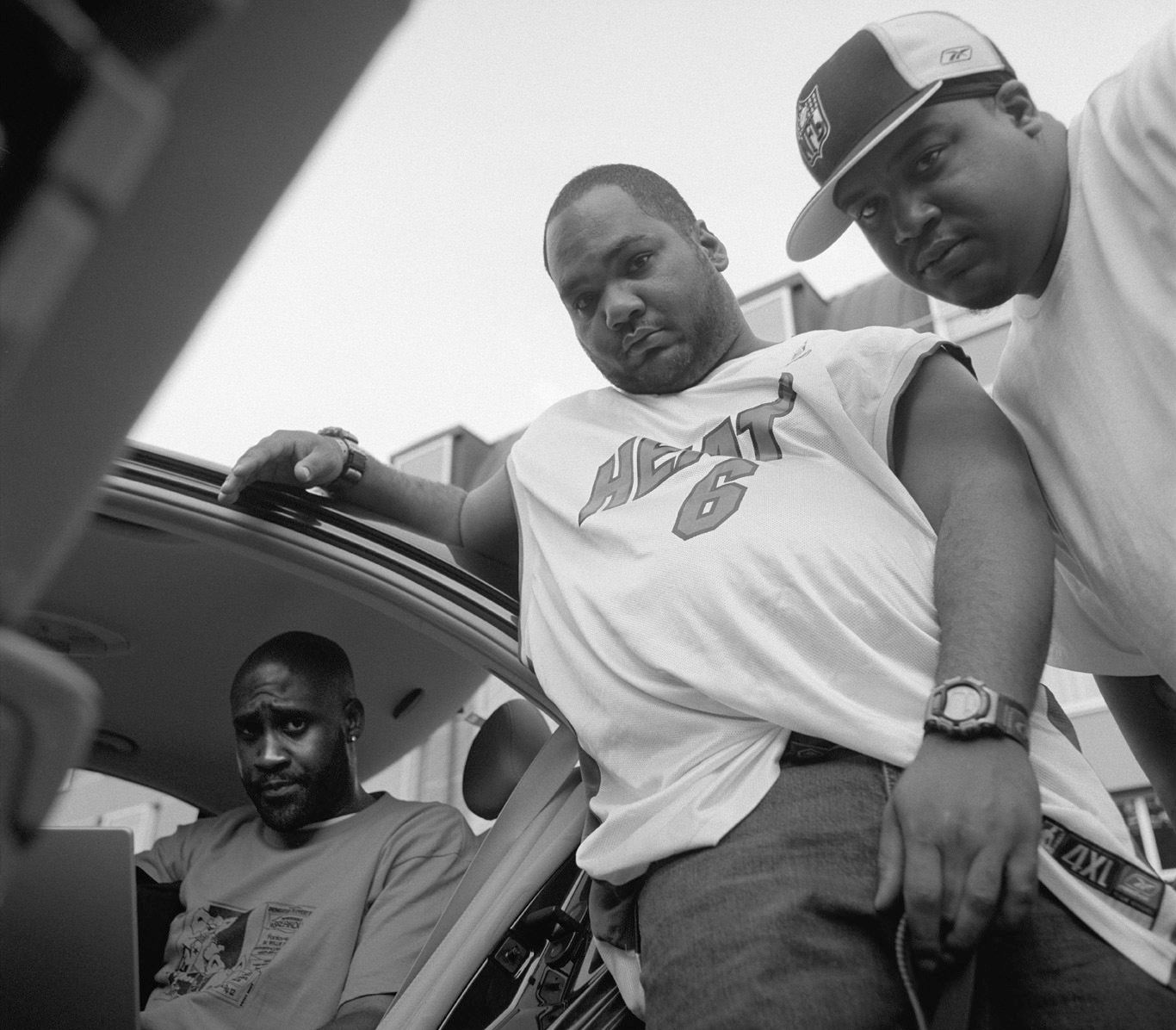
De La Soul in 2002

In 2000, De La Soul launched the Spitkicker Tour, a U.S.-wide tour first hosted by De La Soul, Common, Biz Markie, Talib Kweli, and Pharoahe Monch. That same year, they established the Spitkicker collective, which grew to include progressive hip-hop artists, comedian Dave Chappelle, chef Marcus Samuelsson, and others. De La Soul also announced that they would release a triple album series entitled Art Official Intelligence (AOI). All three albums were intended to be released within a year, beginning with the release of Art Official Intelligence: Mosaic Thump. This was followed by AOI: Bionix in late 2001. After this, however, the third and final album in the AOI series was never released. For the next two years, the only De La Soul releases were singles or remix compilations. David "Trugoy the Dove" Jolicoeur stated in an interview thatabout four years usually were needed for the group to record an album, promote it with advertisements, tour, and so on. The group was having trouble finishing the last AOI installment for many reasons, one of which was an ongoing struggle with Tommy Boy Records, which had been releasing its albums ever since its debut.

In the summer of 2002, De La Soul toured with Cake, Modest Mouse, The Flaming Lips, Kinky, and the Hackensaw Boys during the Unlimited Sunshine Tour. The band was briefly featured in the video game PaRappa the Rapper 2 with the song "Say 'I Gotta Believe!'", featuring Double, and also appeared on the soundtrack of the game.

In 2004, De La Soul released a new full album: The Grind Date on Sanctuary/BMG Records because the venture between Tommy Boy and Warner Bros. Records was shut down and the group's contract was shopped to the other WEA labels. The band thought about having its contract absorbed by Elektra Records, but it decided to leave WEA altogether. Although it was not the third AOI album fans had been expecting, the album was released to some critical acclaim and was well received by most fans. The album features guests MF Doom, Ghostface Killah, Butta Verses, and Flavor Flav, with production from 9th Wonder, Jake One, Madlib, and more. The lead single "Shopping Bags (She Got from You)" did not fare very well and set the tone for disappointing commercial acceptance. In conjunction with the album's release, the group also offered up the track "Come on Down" featuring Flavor Flav for remixing on Sony's Acid Planet website. The winning remix was "Come on Down (KY Raised NY Glazed)" by Interlude Jones, who said he tried to "take the influential sound of old New York hip hop and marry it back to its roots."

=== 2005–present: Features, And the Anonymous Nobody..., the death of Trugoy the Dove, and Cabin in the Sky ===
In 2005, De La Soul collaborated with Gorillaz on the hit single "Feel Good Inc.", which won a Grammy for Best Pop Vocal Collaboration (the first Grammy win in the group's career) after being nominated for three other Grammys. De La Soul also appeared on the LA Symphony single "Universal" and Posdnuos collaborated with the Portuguese MC Boss AC on a track called "Yo (Não Brinques Com Esta Merda)". The following year, they released mixtapes Hip-Hop Mixtape, a covermount with British dance magazine Mixmag, and The Impossible: Mission TV Series – Pt. 1, a release on the group's own AOI Records label. De La Soul collaborated with the athletic sneaker company Nike to produce two versions of the Nike Dunk under their skateboarding division, Nike SB.

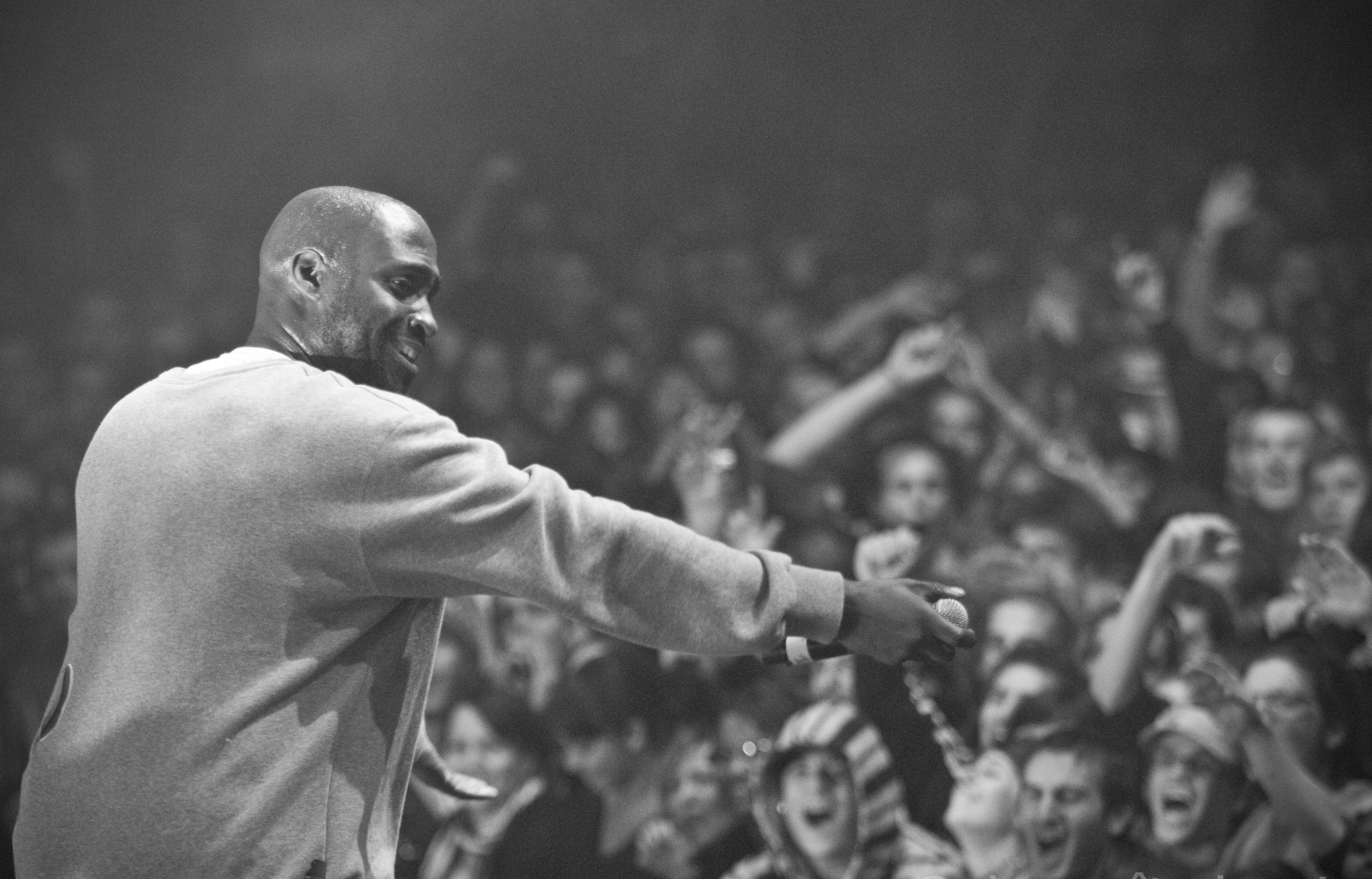
Posdnuos performing at the Marsatac Festival in 2008

In 2008, the group joined A Tribe Called Quest, Nas, Tech N9ne, the Pharcyde, and others on the annual Rock the Bells tour and were honored at the 5th Annual VH1 Hip Hop Honors. Later in the year, they collaborated with dan le sac vs Scroobius Pip on a re-recording of the British group's debut single "Thou Shalt Always Kill".

De La Soul returned as a guest on the third Gorillaz studio album, Plastic Beach alongside Super Furry Animals frontman Gruff Rhys on the song "Superfast Jellyfish". Two other collaborations were recorded, but did not make the final cut for the album. They were supposed to appear on a track entitled "Sloped Tropics", though this song did not make the final cut. The group remixed indie rockers Yo La Tengo's single, "Here to Fall for the Here to Fall" remixes EP, which included remixes by RJD2 and Pete Rock, and were featured on a remix of Matt & Kim's single "Daylight" by DJ Troublemaker.

In 2011, the group earned top-five rankings on both NPR and Soul Train's year-end "Best of" lists with the Amerigo Gazaway-produced De La Soul/Fela Kuti mashup, Fela Soul. De La Soul and Nike released Are You In?: Nike+ Original Run, which was the group's first original material since The Impossible: Mission TV Series – Pt. 1. The album features Raheem DeVaughn, as well as production from the Chicago-based duo Flosstradamus. The recording is a single-track recording at 44 minutes, 17 seconds, part of a continuing series of releases through the Nike+ Sport Music section of the online store.

The group released De La Soul's Plug 1 & Plug 2 presents... First Serve in April 2012, an album that did not feature any contributions from Maseo. With little promotion, the album was released to positive reviews. This was followed by releasing one track a month during 2013.

In March 2015, De La Soul created a Kickstarter to help fund their upcoming album. It surpassed the original goal of $110,000 in under 10 hours. The resulting album, And the Anonymous Nobody..., was released in August 2016. Originally planned for an April release, but delayed due to rights issues, the album was preceded by a four-track EP For Your Pain & Suffering and the single "Pain", featuring Snoop Dogg. The album was nominated at the 59th Grammy Awards for Best Rap Album.

De La Soul was featured on the track "Momentz" on Gorillaz’ 2017 album Humanz, on Leap of Faith by Mr. Jukes, alongside Horace Andy, and on Tom Misch's 2018 single "It Runs Through Me". A 10th studio album, featuring production contributions from Pete Rock and DJ Premier, was reportedly to be released by Mass Appeal Records.

At the 65th Grammy Awards on February 5, 2023, Posdnuos performed a segment of "Buddy" as part of the ceremony’s tribute to 50 years of hip-hop music. A week later, Trugoy the Dove died at the age of 54. He had been suffering from congestive heart failure since 2017. His death came only weeks before the release of De La Soul's music on streaming platforms following their long-fought catalogue disputes. The remaining members of De La Soul and other artists including Nas, Chuck D, and LL Cool J came together for "The DA.I.S.Y Experience", a tribute concert to Trugoy, on March 2, the day before De La Soul's music was released digitally. The re-release of their music led to the group charting in the United Kingdom for the first time since 1990. On February 27, 2023, Gorillaz released the deluxe edition of their album Cracker Island, featuring De La Soul on the song "Crocadillaz".

In September and October of 2023, De La Soul opened for Wu-Tang Clan and Nas during the North American stretch of their New York State of Mind Tour. In 2025, it was announced that Cabin in the Sky would be released on November 21 as part of Mass Appeal Records' 2025 album slate (Legend Has It... chronology), featuring production from DJ Premier, Prince Paul and Pete Rock and guest appearances from Killer Mike, Black Thought, Common and Nas. According to Metacritic, a review aggregator, Cabin in the Sky received generally favorable reviews from critics.

== Catalog dispute ==
De La Soul's back catalog was not released on audio streaming services or digital media stores until 2023. Until 2017, it was owned by Warner Music Group, which according to Posdnuos, had been reluctant to clear samples and renegotiate contracts. The samples used in De La Soul's music were only cleared for physical media distribution; the wording of their contracts is not vague enough to enable them to distribute the music digitally on unforeseen technologies.

In 2017, De La Soul's catalog was purchased by Tommy Boy Records. In February 2019, De La Soul announced that their catalog would soon be available on digital services. However, as they were unhappy receiving 10% of the revenue, with the rest for Tommy Boy, the release was postponed pending further negotiations. Hip-hop artists including Nas, Pete Rock, and Questlove called for a boycott of Tommy Boy. In August, De La Soul announced they had been unable to settle the dispute with Tommy Boy and ended negotiations. In February 2020, Posdnuos said that Tommy Boy "sort of came back to the table, we are looking to sort of get it going". In April, Benjy Grinberg, the head of Rostrum Records, said he was attempting to buy Tommy Boy to return the master recordings to De La Soul.

Tommy Boy enlisted the music-licensing company DMG Clearances to secure clearance for the samples, but talks failed with many of the copyright holders, as they were reticent to become involved with the conflicts between De La Soul and Tommy Boy. On June 4, 2021, Reservoir Media acquired Tommy Boy for US$100 million. On August 8, Talib Kweli announced that De La Soul had gained ownership of their music. In January 2022, DMG Clearances restarted talks with sample copyright owners. It took around a year to license most of the samples; De La Soul interpolated or replayed samples that could not be cleared.

De La Soul's first six albums were released on audio streaming services on March 3, 2023, the 34th anniversary of 3 Feet High and Rising. All their Tommy Boy releases are now owned by De La Soul's company A.O.I., LLC, and are licensed to Chrysalis Records, which, like Tommy Boy, is also owned by Reservoir.

== Soundtrack appearances ==
De La Soul's music has been featured prominently in numerous major motion pictures, including Mr. Holland's Opus ("Ego Trippin' Part Two"), Boiler Room ("Area" and "Keepin' the Faith"), Never Been Kissed ("Me, Myself and I"), High Fidelity ("Tread Water"), Spider-Man: No Way Home ("The Magic Number"), and Teenage Mutant Ninja Turtles: Mutant Mayhem ("Eye Know"), among others. The group also appeared on videogame soundtracks, including "Action" for Angry Birds and Tony Hawk's Pro Skater 4, including its remake.

== Filmography ==
- Chappelle's Show as themselves
- Teen Titans Go! as themselves

== Discography ==
- 3 Feet High and Rising (1989)
- De La Soul Is Dead (1991)
- Buhloone Mindstate (1993)
- Stakes Is High (1996)
- Art Official Intelligence: Mosaic Thump (2000)
- AOI: Bionix (2001)
- The Grind Date (2004)
- Plug 1 & Plug 2 Present... First Serve [without Maseo] (2012)
- And the Anonymous Nobody... (2016)
- Cabin in the Sky (2025)

== Awards and nominations ==
=== Grammy Awards ===
Year	Nominee / work	Award	Result	Ref.
1990	"Me Myself and I"	Best Rap Performance	Nominated	
2001	"Oooh." (featuring Redman)	Best Rap Performance by a Duo or Group	Nominated	
2006	"Feel Good Inc." (with Gorillaz)	Record of the Year	Nominated	
2006	"Feel Good Inc." (with Gorillaz)	Best Pop Collaboration with Vocals	Won	
2006	"Feel Good Inc." (with Gorillaz)	Best Short Form Music Video	Nominated	
2017	And the Anonymous Nobody...	Best Rap Album	Nominated	
2027	"Run It Back!!" (with Nas)	Best Rap Performance	Pending	
