= Q-Tip production discography =

The following is a discography of production by Q-Tip, an American hip hop musician, record producer, and DJ. All songs credited as "produced by A Tribe Called Quest" were produced by Q-Tip, with the exception of "True Fuschnick", "Heavenly Father", and "La Schmoove" by Fu-Schnickens, which were produced by Ali Shaheed Muhammad. Q-Tip's contributions as a member of The Ummah production team are also listed. Q-Tip has also been credited under the pseudonyms "The Abstract", "The Lone Ranger", and "Qualiall".

== 1988 ==
=== Jungle Brothers - Straight out the Jungle ===
- 13. "The Promo" (featuring Q-Tip) (produced by Jungle Brothers & Q-Tip [uncredited])

== 1989 ==
=== A Tribe Called Quest - unreleased demo tape ===
- 03. "Native Tongue"
- 05. "Dust (My Pal)"

=== De La Soul - 3 Feet High and Rising ===
- 19. "Description" (produced by Prince Paul, De La Soul & Q-Tip)

== 1990 ==
=== A Tribe Called Quest - Bonita Applebum (VLS) ===
- A1. "Bonita Applebum (Hootie Mix)"

=== A Tribe Called Quest - I Left My Wallet in El Segundo (VLS) ===
- B1. "Pubic Enemy (Saturday Night Virus Discomix)"

=== A Tribe Called Quest - People's Instinctive Travels and the Paths of Rhythm ===
- 01. "Push It Along"
- 02. "Luck of Lucien"
- 03. "After Hours"
- 04. "Footprints"
- 05. "I Left My Wallet in El Segundo"
- 06. "Pubic Enemy"
- 07. "Bonita Applebum"
- 08. "Can I Kick It?"
- 09. "Youthful Expression"
- 10. "Rhythm (Devoted to the Art of Moving Butts)"
- 11. "Mr. Muhammad"
- 12. "Ham 'n' Eggs"
- 13. "Go Ahead in the Rain"
- 14. "Description of a Fool"

=== Unity 2 - What Is It, Yo?! (VLS) ===
- A1. "What Is It, Yo?! (Jeep Mix)"

== 1991 ==
=== A Tribe Called Quest - Hits, Rarities & Remixes ===
- 06. "Mr. Incognito" (released in 2003)

=== A Tribe Called Quest - Jazz (We've Got) (VLS) ===
- A2. "Jazz (We've Got) (Re-Recording)"

=== A Tribe Called Quest - The Low End Theory ===
- 01. "Excursions"
- 02. "Buggin' Out"
- 03. "Rap Promoter"
- 04. "Butter"
- 05. "Verses from the Abstract" (featuring Vinia Mojica & Ron Carter)
- 06. "Show Business" (featuring Diamond D, Lord Jamar & Sadat X) (produced by Skeff Anselm, co-produced by Q-Tip)
- 07. "Vibes and Stuff"
- 08. "The Infamous Date Rape"
- 09. "Check the Rhime"
- 10. "Everything Is Fair" (produced by Skeff Anselm, co-produced by Q-Tip)
- 11. "Jazz (We've Got)" (originally produced by Pete Rock)
- 12. "Skypager"
- 13. "What?"
- 14. "Scenario" (featuring Leaders of the New School)

== 1992 ==
=== Chi-Ali - Roadrunner (VLS) ===
- A2. "Roadrunner (Puberty Mix)"

=== Diamond D - Stunts, Blunts and Hip Hop ===
- 19. "K.I.S.S. (Keep It Simple Stupid)" (produced by Diamond D, co-produced by Q-Tip)

=== A Tribe Called Quest - Scenario (VLS) ===
- B1. "Scenario (Remix)" (featuring Kid Hood & Leaders of the New School)

=== Various artists - Boomerang soundtrack ===
- 12. "Hot Sex" (performed by A Tribe Called Quest)

== 1993 ==
=== Apache - Apache Ain't Shit ===
- 04. "Gangsta Bitch"

=== Jungle Brothers - On the Road Again (My Jimmy Weighs a Ton) (VLS) ===
- A2. "On the Road Again (My Jimmy Weighs a Ton) (Q-Tip Remix)" (featuring Q-Tip)

=== Run-DMC - Down with the King ===
- 02. "Come on Everybody" (featuring Q-Tip)

=== Tiger - Claws of the Cat ===
- 05. "Who Planned It" (featuring Q-Tip)

=== A Tribe Called Quest - Midnight Marauders ===
- 01. "Midnight Marauders Tour Guide"
- 02. "Steve Biko (Stir It Up)"
- 03. "Award Tour" (featuring Trugoy the Dove)
- 05. "Sucka Nigga"
- 06. "Midnight" (featuring Raphael Wiggins)
- 07. "We Can Get Down"
- 08. "Electric Relaxation"
- 09. "Clap Your Hands"
- 10. "Oh My God" (featuring Busta Rhymes)
- 12. "The Chase, Part II"
- 13. "Lyrics to Go"
- 14. "God Lives Through"

=== A Tribe Called Quest - N/A ===
- 00. "Bound to Wreck Your Body" (The Chase, Part I) {unreleased}

== 1994 ==
=== Craig Mack - Get Down Remix (VLS) ===
- A2. "Get Down (Q-Tip Remix)" (featuring Q-Tip)

=== Nas - Illmatic ===
- 07. "One Love"

=== Nas - The World Is Yours (VLS) ===
- B1. "The World Is Yours (Tip Mix)"

=== A Tribe Called Quest - Oh My God (VLS) ===
- A2. "Oh My God (Remix)"
- B3. "One Two Shit" (featuring Busta Rhymes)

=== Various artists - Crooklyn, Volume 1: Music from the Motion Picture ===
- 01. "Crooklyn" (performed by Crooklyn Dodgers)

== 1995 ==
=== Mobb Deep - The Infamous ===
- 06. "Give Up the Goods (Just Step)" (featuring Big Noyd)
- 07. "Temperature's Rising" (featuring Crystal Johnson) (co-produced by Mobb Deep)
- 14. "Drink Away the Pain (Situations)" (featuring Q-Tip) (co-produced by Mobb Deep)

=== Mobb Deep - Temperature's Rising (VLS) ===
- A1. "Temperature's Rising (Remix)" (featuring Crystal Johnson)

=== Science of Sound - Kaleidoscope Phonetics ===
- 07. "It Ain't Safe"

=== Various artists - The Show: The Soundtrack ===
- 22. "Glamour and Glitz" (performed by A Tribe Called Quest)

== 1996 ==
=== Busta Rhymes - The Coming ===
- 08. "Ill Vibe" (featuring Q-Tip)

=== Cypress Hill - Unreleased and Revamped ===
- 07. "Illusions (Q-Tip Remix)"

=== Da Bush Babees - Gravity ===
- 06. "3 MCs" (featuring Q-Tip)

=== The Roots - Illadelph Halflife ===
- 17. "Ital (The Universal Side)" (featuring Q-Tip) (produced by The Grand Negaz, co-produced by Q-Tip)

=== A Tribe Called Quest - Beats, Rhymes and Life ===
- 01. "Phony Rappers"
- 03. "Motivators"
- 04. "Jam"
- 06. "The Pressure"
- 08. "Mind Power"
- 11. "Baby Phife's Return"
- 13. "What Really Goes On"

=== Various artists - High School High: The Soundtrack ===
- 13. "Peace, Prosperity & Paper" (performed by A Tribe Called Quest)

=== Young Zee - Musical Meltdown ===
- 17. "Everybody Get (Remix)" {released in 2015}

== 1997 ==
=== The Lone Ranger (aka Q-Tip) - It's Yours (VLS) ===
- A1. "It's Yours"
- A3. "Moneymaker"

=== Mariah Carey - Butterfly ===
- 01. "Honey" (co-produced by Mariah Carey, Puff Daddy, Stevie J)

=== Mint Condition - Let Me Be the One (VLS) ===
- B1. "Let Me Be the One (Ummah Remix)" (featuring Q-Tip)

=== Towa Tei - Happy ===
- 04. "Happy (Q-Tip Remix Dub)"

=== Various artists - Men in Black: The Album ===
- 10. "Same Ol' Thing" (performed by A Tribe Called Quest)

=== Various artists - Rhyme & Reason soundtrack ===
- 02. "Wild Hot" (performed by Busta Rhymes & A Tribe Called Quest) (co-produced by Busta Rhymes)

== 1998 ==
=== A Tribe Called Quest - The Love Movement ===
- 05. "Like It Like That"
- 06. "Common Ground (Get It Goin' On)"
- 09. "Give Me" (featuring Noreaga)
- 10. "Pad & Pen" (featuring D-Life)
- 12. "Hot 4 U"
- 14. "The Love"
- 15. "Rock Rock Y'all" (featuring Punchline, Jane Doe, Wordsworth & Mos Def)

=== Various artists - Slam: The Soundtrack ===
- 08. "Hey" (performed by Q-Tip)

== 1999 ==
=== Heavy D - Heavy ===
- 04. "Listen" (featuring Q-Tip) (produced by Jay Dee & Q-Tip)

=== Q-Tip - Amplified ===
(All songs produced by Jay Dee & Q-Tip, except where noted.)

- 01. "Wait Up"
- 02. "Higher"
- 03. "Breathe and Stop" (produced by Jay Dee)
- 04. "Moving with U"
- 05. "Let's Ride"
- 06. "Things U Do"
- 07. "All In" (featuring Meda Leacock)
- 08. "Go Hard"
- 10. "Vivrant Thing" (produced by Q-Tip)
- 12. "End of Time" (featuring Korn)
- 13. "Do It, See It, Be It" (hidden track)

=== Various artists - The PJs: Music from & Inspired by the Hit Television Series ===
- 10. "Get Involved" (performed and produced by Raphael Saadiq & Q-Tip)

== 2000 ==
=== Various artists - La Contrebande - Mixtape Vol. 1 ===
- B5. "Truc D'MC (Remix)" (performed by Faf Larage & Vasquez Lusi)

=== Whitney Houston - Whitney: The Greatest Hits ===
- 2-01. "Fine" (produced by Raphael Saadiq & Q-Tip)

== 2001 ==
=== Q-Tip - Kamaal the Abstract ===
(Recorded in 2001, the album was shelved by Arista Records before being released in 2009 on Battery Records.)

- 01. "Feelin"
- 02. "Do You Dig U?" (featuring Kurt Rosenwinkel & Gary Thomas)
- 03. "A Million Times"
- 04. "Blue Girl"
- 05. "Barely in Love"
- 06. "Heels"
- 07. "Abstractionisms" (featuring Kenny Garrett a.k.a. Truth)
- 08. "Caring"
- 09. "Even If It Is So"
- 10. "Make It Work" (CD, LP bonus track)
- 11. "Damn You're Cool" (LP, iTunes bonus track)

=== Q-Tip - Makin' It Blend (VLS) ===
- B3. "Jay Dee / Q-Tip Beats Skit" (produced by Jay Dee & Q-Tip)

=== Various artists - Prison Song soundtrack (unreleased) ===
- 00. "Mom's Song" (performed by Mary J. Blige)
- 00. "Big Pete's Rap" (performed by Fat Joe)
- 00. "The Shower" (performed by Q-Tip)
- 00. "The Yard" (performed by Q-Tip)

== 2002 ==
=== Q-Tip - "A" List DJ Promo ===
- A1. "Breathe and Stop 2002"

=== Various artists - Soundbombing III ===
- 10. "What Lies Beneath" (performed by Q-Tip)

== 2003 ==
=== Kurt Rosenwinkel - Heartcore ===
(All songs produced by Kurt Rosenwinkel and co-produced by Q-Tip.)

- 01. "Heartcore"
- 02. "Blue Line"
- 03. "All the Way to Rajasthan"
- 04. "Your Vision"
- 05. "Interlude"
- 06. "Our Secret World"
- 07. "Dream/Memory?"
- 08. "Love in the Modern World"
- 09. "dcba//>>"
- 10. "Thought About You"
- 11. "Tone Poem"

=== Stanley Clarke - 1, 2, to the Bass ===
- 01. "1, 2, to the Bass" (featuring Q-Tip) (co-produced by Stanley Clarke)

== 2004 ==
=== Nas - Street's Disciple ===
- 1-04. "American Way" (featuring Kelis)

=== Q-Tip - Open (unreleased) ===
(Completed by 2004, the album was shelved by Universal Motown Records. Tracks 1, 3, 9, 10, and 15 were reworked and featured on The Renaissance.)

- 01. "Johnny Died"
- 02. "Black Boy"
- 03. "Official"
- 04. "Hard" (aka "N/A") (featuring Common)
- 05. "Request" (aka "Say Something for Me")
- 06. "Interlude"
- 07. "I'm Not Gone Have It"
- 08. "Unknown"
- 09. "Feelings"
- 10. "Where Do You Go"
- 11. "Unidentified"
- 12. "Be Brave" (aka "That's Sexy") (featuring André 3000)
- 13. "Late Mornin'"
- 15. "I Believe" (featuring D'Angelo)
- 16. "Lisa (Extended Instrumental)"
- 17. "Instrumental"
- 18. "Lisa"

== 2005 ==
=== Q-Tip - N/A ===
- 00. "For the Nasty (Remix)" (featuring Busta Rhymes)

== 2006 ==
=== Q-Tip - N/A ===
- 00. "Passes You By"

== 2007 ==
=== Q-Tip - Work It Out (VLS) ===
- A1. "Work It Out (Clean)"

== 2008 ==
=== Q-Tip - N/A ===
- 00. "Scram Jones"

=== Q-Tip - The Renaissance ===
- 01. "Johnny Is Dead"
- 02. "Won't Trade"
- 03. "Gettin' Up"
- 04. "Official"
- 05. "You"
- 06. "We Fight/We Love" (featuring Raphael Saadiq)
- 07. "Manwomanboogie" (featuring Amanda Diva)
- 08. "Renaissance Rap" (hidden track after "Move")
- 09. "Dance on Glass"
- 10. "Life Is Better" (featuring Norah Jones)
- 11. "Believe" (featuring D'Angelo)
- 12. "Shaka"
- 13. "Good Thang" (digital bonus track)

== 2009 ==
=== Grand Puba - Retroactive ===
- 05. "Good to Go" (featuring Q-Tip)

=== Q-Tip - N/A ===
- 00. "We Fight/We Love (Remix)" (featuring Kanye West & Consequence)

== 2010 ==
=== Kanye West - GOOD Fridays single ===
- 01. "Chain Heavy" (featuring Consequence & Talib Kweli)

=== Kanye West - N/A ===
- 00. "Mama's Boyfriend" (Q-Tip version)

=== Layne Harper - N/A ===
- 00. "City Lights"

=== Quincy Jones - Q Soul Bossa Nostra ===
- 09. "Betcha Wouldn't Hurt Me" (featuring Mary J. Blige, Q-Tip & Alfredo Rodríguez) (produced by Q-Tip & Quincy Jones)

== 2011 ==
=== Consequence - Movies on Demand 2 ===
- 12. "Got Me Trippin'"

=== Jay-Z & Kanye West - Watch the Throne ===
- 02. "Lift Off" (featuring Beyoncé) (produced by Jeff Bhasker, Kanye West & Mike Dean, co-produced by Pharrell & Q-Tip, additional production by Don Jazzy)
- 07. "That's My Bitch" (produced by Kanye West & Q-Tip, co-produced by Jeff Bhasker)

== 2012 ==
=== Consequence - N/A ===
- 00. "Trust Fund Baby"

=== Esperanza Spalding - Radio Music Society ===
- 03. "Crowned & Kissed" (co-produced by Esperanza Spalding)
- 11. "City of Roses" (co-produced by Esperanza Spalding)

=== Roc Marciano - Reloaded ===
- 12. "Thread Count"

=== Santigold - Master of My Make-Believe ===
- 01. "Go!" (featuring Karen O) (co-produced by Santigold & Switch)

== 2013 ==
=== Busta Rhymes & Q-Tip - The Abstract and the Dragon ===
- 07. "The Abstract & the Dragon"
- 11. "We Taking Off"
- 14. "Butch & Sundance"
- 16. "Pardon My Ways (ELE 2 Exclusive)"

=== John Legend - Love in the Future ===
- 09. "Tomorrow"

== 2014 ==
=== Mariah Carey - Me. I Am Mariah... The Elusive Chanteuse ===
- 10. "Meteorite" (co-produced by Mariah Carey)

== 2015 ==
=== Pusha T - King Push – Darkest Before Dawn: The Prelude ===
- 09. "F.I.F.A."

== 2016 ==
=== Consequence - N/A ===
- 00. "The Needle Drop (Here Comes Trouble)"

=== Solange - A Seat at the Table ===
- 14. "Borderline (An Ode to Self Care)" (featuring Q-Tip) (produced by Q-Tip & Solange)

=== Termanology - More Politics ===
- 05. "We're Both Wrong" (featuring Saigon)

=== A Tribe Called Quest - We Got It from Here... Thank You 4 Your Service ===
(All songs co-produced by Blair Wells.)

- 01. "The Space Program"
- 02. "We the People...."
- 03. "Whateva Will Be"
- 04. "Solid Wall of Sound"
- 05. "Dis Generation"
- 06. "Kids..."
- 07. "Melatonin"
- 08. "Enough!!"
- 09. "Mobius"
- 10. "Black Spasmodic"
- 11. "The Killing Season"
- 12. "Lost Somebody"
- 13. "Movin Backwards"
- 14. "Conrad Tokyo"
- 15. "Ego"
- 16. "The Donald"

== 2018 ==
=== Anderson .Paak - Oxnard ===
- 12. "Cheers" (featuring Q-Tip) (produced by Focus..., Q-Tip & Dr. Dre, co-produced by Andre Brissett)

=== Neek the Exotic - Hell Up in Queens ===
- 02. "Hell Up in Queens" (featuring Stoxx)

=== Roc Marciano - Behold a Dark Horse ===
- 13. "Consigliere"

=== Various artists - Revamp: Reimagining the Songs of Elton John & Bernie Taupin ===
- 08. "Don't Go Breaking My Heart" (performed by Q-Tip & Demi Lovato)

== 2019 ==
=== Danny Brown - UKnoWhatImSayin? ===
- 03. "Dirty Laundry"
- 07. "Best Life"
- 11. "Combat"

== 2021 ==
=== Cordae - Just Until... ===
- 01. "More Life" (featuring Q-Tip) (produced by Eric Hudson, Kid Culture & Q-Tip)

== 2024 ==
=== LL Cool J - The FORCE ===
- 01. "Spirit of Cyrus" (featuring Snoop Dogg)
- 02. "The FORCE"
- 03. "Saturday Night Special" (featuring Rick Ross & Fat Joe)
- 04. "Black Code Suite" (featuring Sona Jobarteh) (additional production by Sona Jobarteh)
- 05. "Passion"
- 06. "Proclivities" (featuring Saweetie)
- 07. "Post Modern"
- 08. "30 Decembers"
- 09. "Runnit Back"
- 10. "Huey in the Chair" (featuring Busta Rhymes)
- 11. "Basquiat Energy"
- 12. "Praise Him" (featuring Nas)
- 13. "Murdergram Deux" (featuring Eminem) (additional production by Eminem)

== 2025 ==
=== Slick Rick - Victory ===
- 15. "Another Great Adventure" (co-produced by Slick Rick)

== Other technical credits ==
(Not including credits from Q-Tip's solo albums or A Tribe Called Quest albums.)

Year	Artist	Album	Track(s)	Role(s)
1995	Mobb Deep	The Infamous	"Give Up the Goods (Just Step)"	Mixing
1995	Mobb Deep	The Infamous	"Temperature's Rising"	Mixing
1995	Mobb Deep	The Infamous	"Up North Trip"	Mixing
1995	Mobb Deep	The Infamous	"Trife Life"	Mixing
1995	Mobb Deep	The Infamous	"Drink Away the Pain (Situations)"	Mixing
1995	Mobb Deep	The Infamous	"Survival of the Fittest"	Drum programming (uncredited)
1997	Mariah Carey	Butterfly	"Honey"	Drum programming
1997	The Brand New Heavies	Sometimes (CDS)	"Sometimes (Ummah Remix)"	Mixing
2000	D'Angelo	Voodoo	"Left & Right"	Vocal percussion (beatboxing)
2000	Busta Rhymes	Anarchy	"Live It Up"	Mixing
2011	Jay-Z & Kanye West	Watch the Throne	"That's My Bitch"	Mixing
2012	Esperanza Spalding	Radio Music Society	"City of Roses"	Glockenspiel (percussion)
2013	John Legend	Love in the Future	"Tomorrow"	Keyboards, drums
2014	Mariah Carey	Me. I Am Mariah... The Elusive Chanteuse	"Meteorite"	Keyboards
2015	Pusha T	King Push – Darkest Before Dawn: The Prelude	"F.I.F.A."	Keyboards
2016	Solange	A Seat at the Table	"Borderline (An Ode to Self Care)"	Keyboards, drums
2018	Various artists	Revamp: Reimagining the Songs of Elton John & Bernie Taupin	"Don't Go Breaking My Heart"	Drums, bass
2022	Jack White	Fear of the Dawn	"Hi-De-Ho"	Handclaps
2022	Robert Glasper	Black Radio III	"Why We Speak"	Vocal engineering
2024	LL Cool J	The FORCE	"Spirit of Cyrus"	Bass, drums
2024	LL Cool J	The FORCE	"The FORCE"	Bass, drums, keyboards
2024	LL Cool J	The FORCE	"Runnit Back"	Bass, drums, keyboards
2024	LL Cool J	The FORCE	"Saturday Night Special"	Keyboards
2024	LL Cool J	The FORCE	"Black Code Suite"	Bass
2024	LL Cool J	The FORCE	"Huey in the Chair"	Bass
2024	LL Cool J	The FORCE	"Praise Him"	Bass
2024	LL Cool J	The FORCE	"Passion"	Bass, keyboards
2024	LL Cool J	The FORCE	"30 Decembers"	Bass, keyboards
2024	LL Cool J	The FORCE	"Runnit Back"	Bass, keyboards
2024	LL Cool J	The FORCE	"Proclivities"	Bass, keyboards, guitar
2024	LL Cool J	The FORCE	"Post Modern"	Keyboards, guitar
