= The Anthology (A Tribe Called Quest album) =

Greatest hits album by A Tribe Called Quest
- Released: October 26, 1999
- Recorded: 1989–1998
- Genre: Alternative hip hop; jazz rap
- Length: 71:18
- Label: Jive
- Producer: A Tribe Called Quest; Hoods; Q-Tip; The Ummah

A Tribe Called Quest chronology
The Love Movement (1998)	The Anthology (1999)	Hits, Rarities & Remixes (2003)

Professional ratings
Review scores
Source	Rating
Allmusic	4.5/5 stars
The A.V. Club	(mixed)
The Encyclopedia of Popular Music	4/5 stars
Entertainment Weekly	A
Q	4/5 stars
Robert Christgau	A
The Source	(favorable)
UKMIX	5/5 stars

The Anthology is A Tribe Called Quest's 1999 greatest hits compilation spanning their career up to that point. The compilation contains songs from all of their currently existing full-length catalogue, including People's Instinctive Travels and the Paths of Rhythm, The Low End Theory, Midnight Marauders, Beats, Rhymes and Life and The Love Movement, as well as select soundtrack releases. It also contains Q-Tip's "Vivrant Thing", which was featured on the first music compilation for Violator Management through Violator Records/Def Jam Recordings. The song would also later be featured on Q-Tip's solo effort, 1999's Amplified. "Vivrant Thing" is also substituted with "Mr. Incognito" for the Japan release. The album cover features Erykah Badu with fluorescent stripes of green and orange reminiscent of the traditional colors of the Kente tribe of the north Congo.

In the UK, a limited edition album was released with a bonus remix CD. The album was accompanied by The Video Anthology, a DVD release which contained most of the group's videos.

== Track listing ==
1. "Check the Rhime" (from The Low End Theory) – 3:38
2. "Bonita Applebum" (from People's Instinctive Travels and the Paths of Rhythm) – 3:36
3. "Award Tour" (from Midnight Marauders) – 3:26
4. "Can I Kick It?" (from People's Instinctive Travels and the Paths of Rhythm) – 4:24
5. "Scenario" (from The Low End Theory) – 4:09
6. "Buggin' Out" (from The Low End Theory) – 3:39
7. "If the Papes Come" (from Mi Vida Loca soundtrack) – 4:14
8. "Electric Relaxation" (from Midnight Marauders) – 3:46
9. "Jazz (We've Got)" (from The Low End Theory) – 4:10
10. "I Left My Wallet in El Segundo" (from People's Instinctive Travels and the Paths of Rhythm) – 4:06
11. "Hot Sex" (from Boomerang (soundtrack)) - 2:45
12. "Oh My God" (from Midnight Marauders) – 3:24
13. "Stressed Out" (from Beats, Rhymes and Life) – 4:53
14. "Luck of Lucien" (from People's Instinctive Travels and the Paths of Rhythm) – 4:32
15. "Description of a Fool" (from People's Instinctive Travels and the Paths of Rhythm) – 5:41
16. "Keeping It Moving" (from Beats, Rhymes and Life) – 3:48
17. "Find a Way" (from The Love Movement) – 3:23
18. "Sucka Nigga" (from Midnight Marauders) – 3:56
19. "Vivrant Thing" (from Violator: The Album) – 3:11

=== Bonus CD ===
In the UK, a limited edition album was released with a bonus remix CD.

1. "Bonita Applebum (12" Why? Edit)"
2. "I Left My Wallet in El Segundo (Vampire Mix)"
3. "Pubic Enemy (Saturday Night Virus Discomix)"
4. "Can I Kick It? (Extended Boilerhouse Mix)"
5. "Scenario (Young Nation Mix)"
6. "Bonita Applebum (Hootie Mix)"
7. "Oh My God (UK Flavour Radio Mix)"

=== Japan release ===
1. "Check the Rhime" – 3:38
2. "Bonita Applebum" – 3:36
3. "Award Tour" – 3:26
  - Featuring Trugoy
4. "Can I Kick It?" – 4:24
5. "Scenario" – 4:09
  - Featuring Leaders of the New School
6. "Buggin' Out" – 3:39
7. "If the Papes Come" – 4:14
8. "Electric Relaxation" – 3:46
9. "Jazz (We've Got)" – 4:10
10. "I Left My Wallet in El Segundo" – 4:06
11. "Hot Sex" – 2:45
12. "Oh My God" – 3:24
13. "Stressed Out" – 4:53
  - Featuring Consequence & Faith Evans
14. "Luck of Lucien" – 4:32
15. "Description of a Fool" – 5:41
16. "Keeping It Moving" – 3:48
17. "Find a Way" – 3:23
18. "Sucka Nigga" – 3:56
19. "Mr. Incognito" - 3:50 (previously unreleased)

== Charts ==
Chart (1999)	Peak position
Canadian R&B Albums (Nielsen SoundScan)	2
US Billboard 200	81
US Top R&B/Hip-Hop Albums (Billboard)	28

=== Year-end charts ===
Chart (2002)	Position
Canadian Rap Albums (Nielsen SoundScan)	100

== Certifications ==
Certifications for The Anthology
Region	Certification	Certified units/sales
United Kingdom (BPI)	Silver	60,000^{‡}
^{‡} Sales+streaming figures based on certification alone.
