= Jim Swaffield =

Music video director

- Born: United States
- Occupation: Film director
- Years active: 1988—present

Jim Swaffield is an American music video director and video editor. He has worked with A Tribe Called Quest, DJ Jazzy Jeff & The Fresh Prince and Coolio. He is also known for working with R. Kelly on Trapped in the Closet.

== Filmography as director ==
=== Music videos ===
Year	Song	Artist	Album
1990	Can I Kick It?	A Tribe Called Quest	People's Instinctive Travels and the Paths of Rhythm
1991	Check the Rhime	A Tribe Called Quest	The Low End Theory
1991	Jazz (We've Got)	A Tribe Called Quest	The Low End Theory
1991	Summertime	DJ Jazzy Jeff & The Fresh Prince	Homebase
1991	Funke Wisdom	Kool Moe Dee	Funke, Funke Wisdom
1991	(Hurt Me! Hurt Me!) But the Pants Stay On	Samantha Fox	Just One Night
1992	Scenario	A Tribe Called Quest	The Low End Theory
1993	I'm Outstanding	Shaquille O'Neal	Shaq Diesel
1993	Shoot Pass Slam	Shaquille O'Neal	Shaq Diesel
1994	I Remember	Coolio	It Takes a Thief
2010	Echo	R. Kelly	Untitled
2010	Be My #2	R. Kelly	Untitled
2010	Sign of a Victory	R. Kelly	Listen Up! The Official 2010 FIFA World Cup Album, Epic
2015	Happy Birthday	R. Kelly	N/A
2015	I Don't Belong to You	Keke Palmer	N/A

=== Direct-to-video films ===
Year	Film	Distributor
2005	Trapped in the Closet (Chapter 1–12)	Jive/SBMG
2007	R. Kelly Live the Light It Up Tour	Jive/Image
2007	Trapped in the Closet Chapters 13–22	Jive, SBMG
2012	Trapped in the Closet: Chapters 23–33	RCA/Sony

== Awards and nominations ==
Year	Association	Category	Work	Result
2005	Grammy Awards	Best Long Form Music Video	Trapped in the Closet (Chapter 1-12)	Nominated
2007	Grammy Awards	Best Long Form Music Video	Trapped in the Closet (Chapter 13-22)	Nominated
