= The Lost Tribes (album) =

Compilation album by A Tribe Called Quest
- Released: March 15, 2006
- Recorded: 1988–1998
- Genre: Hip hop

A Tribe Called Quest chronology
Hits, Rarities & Remixes (2003)	The Lost Tribes (2006)	The Best of A Tribe Called Quest (2008)

The Lost Tribes is a compilation of rare material by A Tribe Called Quest, released in Japan. "ICU (Doin It)" was originally released in 2003 and was the last new music from the group until they released their sixth and final studio album, We Got It from Here... Thank You 4 Your Service, in 2016.. "That Shit" is the only A Tribe Called Quest song released with vocals by Jay Dee. "Scenario (Remix)" was the B-side to the original. The original version of "Jam" can be found on Beats, Rhymes and Life, as well as the original "Stressed Out".

== Track listing ==
1. "Oh My God (UK Flavor Radio Mix)"
2. "Mardi Gras at Midnight" (Feat. Rah Digga)
3. "The Remedy" (Feat. Common)
4. "Can I Kick It? (Phase 5 Mix)" (Denmark)
5. "Stressed Out Remix (Baby Phife Version)"
6. "Scenario (Remix)" (Feat. Leaders of the New School)
7. "ICU (Doin' It)" (Feat. Erykah Badu)
8. "It's Yours"
9. "Jam (Remix)" (Feat. Consequence)
10. "Game Day" (Feat. Rodney Hampton)
11. "Glamour & Glitz"
12. "Weekendz" (Feat. Consequence)
13. "Hey"
14. "Rumble in the Jungle" (Feat. Busta Rhymes, John Forté & Fugees)
15. "Practice Session"
16. "That Shit" (Feat. Jay Dee) (bonus track)
