= 1nce Again =

Single by A Tribe Called Quest

from the album Beats, Rhymes and Life
- B-side: "One, Two, Shit"
- Released: July 1, 1996
- Recorded: 1995
- Genre: Alternative hip-hop
- Length: 3:49
- Label: Jive
- Songwriters: Kamaal Fareed; Ali Shaheed Muhammad; Malik Taylor; James Yancey; Steve Swallow
- Producer: The Ummah

A Tribe Called Quest singles chronology
"Oh My God" (1994)	"1nce Again" (1996)	"Stressed Out" (1996)

Audio sample
- 1nce Again: file; help

Music video
- "1nce Again" on YouTube

"1nce Again" is a song by the hip-hop group A Tribe Called Quest, released as the first single from their fourth album Beats, Rhymes and Life.

== Music video ==
The music video, released in August 1996, begins with the group recreating the "Check the Rhime" video, with a crowd cheering. However, Phife notices that the police have come to arrest them, so the group runs into a dry cleaning store to hide. In the video, the group runs through different sections of the store while rapping. Tammy Lucas is also present in the store singing the chorus. At the end of the video, the police see the group running away up a flight of stairs. The group get onto the roof, at night, and they jump off the building as the video ends. Busta Rhymes makes an appearance in the music video.

== Charts ==
Chart (1996)	Peak position
Scotland Singles (OCC)	70
UK Dance (OCC)	4
UK Hip Hop/R&B (OCC)	5
UK Singles (OCC)	34
US Dance Singles Sales (Billboard) Double A-side with "Stressed Out"	3
US R&B/Hip-Hop Airplay (Billboard)	38

=== Aphrodite remix ===
Chart (1996)	Peak position
US Dance Singles Sales (Billboard)	30
