= Lost tribe =

Lost tribe(s) may refer to:

- Archaic term for uncontacted peoples, indigenous peoples unknown to Christian world
- Ten Lost Tribes, the Lost Tribes of Israel

== TV and film ==
- The Lost Tribes (TV series), a 2007 Australian reality series
- The Lost Tribe, a 1980 BBC television drama serial, starring Bill Paterson & Miriam Margolyes
- "The Lost Tribe" (The Goodies), an episode of The Goodies
- "The Lost Tribe" (Stargate Atlantis), an episode of Stargate Atlantis
- The Lost Tribe (1949 film), a 1949 film in the Jungle Jim series
- The Lost Tribe (1985 film), a 1985 New Zealand horror film
- The Lost Tribe (2010 film), a 2010 remake of the 2009 horror film The Forgotten Ones

== Music ==
- Lost Tribe, an English electronic music duo
- Lost Tribe, a 1990s jazz-rock ensemble featuring David Binney, David Gilmore, Adam Rogers, Fima Ephron, and Ben Perowsky
- The Lost Tribes (album), by A Tribe Called Quest, 2006
- Lost Tribes, an album by The Zawinul Syndicate, 1992
- "Lost Tribes", a song by Gruff Rhys from American Interior, 2014

== Books ==
- The Lost Tribe, a 1983 Choose Your Own Adventure book
- The Lost Tribe, a 1978 book by Jack Ronder published by W.H. Allen.
