= De La Mix Tape: Remixes, Rarities and Classics =

Compilation album by De La Soul
- Released: June 8, 2004
- Genre: Hip Hop
- Label: Rhino Records

De La Soul chronology
Live at Tramps, NYC, 1996 (2004)	De La Mix Tape: Remixes, Rarities and Classics (2004)	The Grind Date (2004)

Professional ratings
Review scores
Source	Rating
AllMusic	2/5 stars
The Rolling Stone Album Guide	4/5 stars

De La Mix Tape: Remixes, Rarities and Classics is a 2004 De La Soul compilation album from Rhino Records. It is similar to the A Tribe Called Quest compilation album Hits, Rarities & Remixes.

== Track listing ==
#	Title	Length	Performer(s)	Producer(s)	Notes
1	"Stakes Is High (Remix)"	4:49	De La Soul, Mos Def, and Truth Enola	J Dilla	
2	"Oodles of O's"	3:32	De La Soul	Prince Paul	from De La Soul is Dead
3	"Trouble in the Water"	3:46	DJ Honda featuring De La Soul	DJ Honda	
4	"Piles and Piles of Demo Tapes Bi-Da Miles (Conley's Decision)"	4:06	De La Soul	De La Soul	
5	"I.C. Y'all"	3:20	De La Soul featuring Busta Rhymes	Rockwilder	from Art Official Intelligence: Mosaic Thump
6	"Big Brother Beat"	3:44	De La Soul featuring Mos Def	De La Soul	from Stakes Is High
7	"More Than U Know"	4:25	Prince Paul featuring De La Soul	Prince Paul	from the Prince Paul album A Prince Among Thieves
8	"Sweet Dreams (Clean Version)"	3:27	De La Soul		
9	"The Magic Number"	3:16	De La Soul	Prince Paul	from the album 3 Feet High and Rising
10	"Potholes In My Lawn (Live)"	2:36	De La Soul		from Live at Tramps, NYC, 1996
11	"The Hustle"	3:53	De La Soul featuring Da Beatminerz	Da Beatminerz	from America Is Dying Slowly
12	"Itsoweezee (HOT) (De La Soul Remix)"	4:38	De La Soul featuring Yankee B	De La Soul	
13	"Stakes Is High (DJ Spinna Original Vocal)	4:41	De La Soul	J Dilla and DJ Spinna	
14	"Me Myself and I (Badmarsh + Shri Remix)"	4:02	De La Soul	Prince Paul and Badmarsh + Shri	

== Personnel ==
- Karen Ahmed – Project Assistant
- Skeff Anselm – producer
- Vanessa Atkins – Project Assistant
- Badmarsh & Shri – remixing
- Barry Benson – Compilation Producer
- Joe Buck – Cover Design
- Emily Cagan – Project Assistant
- Chairman Mao – Liner Notes
- Reggie Collins – Annotation
- Pic Conley – Flute
- Chris Conway – mixing
- DaBeatminerz – producer
- De La Soul – arranger, producer, remixing, mixing
- DJ Honda – producer
- DJ Joc Max – remixing
- DJ Spinna – remixing
- Sue Faber – mixing
- Cory Frye – Project Assistant
- Leigh Hall – Project Assistant
- Dan Hersch – Remastering
- Troy Hightower – mixing
- Jay Dee – producer, remixing
- Masaki Koike – Art Direction, Design
- Tim Latham – mixing
- Suzanne Love – Project Assistant
- April Milek – Project Assistant
- Mos Def – vocals
- Randy Perry – Project Assistant
- Steve Pokorny – Remastering
- Bob Power – mixing
- Prince Paul – arranger, producer, mixing
- Rockwilder – producer
- Gladys Sanchez – Project Assistant
- Tim Scanlin – Project Assistant
- Glenn Schwartz – Project Assistant
- Dorothy Stefanski – editorial Supervision
- Truth Enola – vocals
- Diana Washburn – Project Assistant
- Mason Williams – Project Assistant
- Yankee B. – vocals
