= I-Level =

British band

- Origin: London, England
- Genres: Post-disco, R&B
- Years active: 1982–1985
- Labels: Virgin
- Past members: Duncan Bridgeman; Joe Dworniak; Sam Jones

I-Level were a British post-disco, R&B band, known for their underground UK club tracks "Minefield" and "Give Me" (also released as "Give Me What You Can't Get Back"). Under license to the US label Epic Records, the band had some chart success in the UK and US. Other tracks by the band included "In the Sand" and "In the River".

== History ==
Sam Jones met Joe Dworniak at Music Works, Holloway Road Studio, where the latter worked as an audio engineer. At the time Jones was a member of the band Brimstone, and later they went on to form I-Level with Duncan Bridgeman. They were signed to Virgin Records in 1982 by Mick Clark and were signed to a publishing deal with April Music by Lucien Grange. They went on to release two albums and eight singles and were awarded 'Most Promising Newcomers' by the readers of the music magazine Blues & Soul in 1982.

Over the years "Give Me" has been sampled by Sandy Kerr on "Thug Rock" (1982); AZ featuring Nas on "Gimme Yours" on the 1995 album Doe or Die; Lost Boyz on "So Love" on their 1997 album, Love, Peace & Nappiness; and A Tribe Called Quest on "Give Me" (featuring Noreaga) on their 1998 album, The Love Movement. "Give Me" was included on the compilation album Gary Crowley's Lost 80s (2019).

In 1985, I-Level disbanded and the members worked on music projects with other musicians. All three band members continued their music careers as record producers.

== Discography ==
=== Albums ===
Year	Album	Chart positions
Year	Album	UK
1983	I-Level	50
1985	Shake	—

=== Singles ===
Year	Title	Chart positions		
Year	Title	US R&B	US Dance	UK
1982	"Give Me"	5	11	—
1983	"Minefield"	—	5	52
1983	"Teacher"	—	—	56
1983	"Stone Heart (Stone Woman)"	—	—	86
1984	"Our Song"	—	—	—
1984	"In the River"	—	—	81
1985	"In the Sand"	—	—	93
1985	"New Day"	—	—	—
2021	"YBSA (Your Beauty Stands Alone)"	—	—	—
"—" denotes releases that did not chart.
