= Can I Kick It? =

Single by A Tribe Called Quest

from the album People's Instinctive Travels and the Paths of Rhythm
- B-side: "If the Papes Come"
- Released: 1990
- Recorded: 1989
- Genre: Alternative hip-hop
- Length: 4:12 (album version); 4:24 (The Anthology version); 6:39 (boilerhouse mix)
- Label: Jive
- Songwriters: Lewis Reed; Kamaal Fareed; Ali Muhammad
- Producer: A Tribe Called Quest

A Tribe Called Quest singles chronology
"Bonita Applebum" (1990)	"Can I Kick It?" (1990)	"Check the Rhime" (1991)

Music video
- "Can I Kick It?" on YouTube

"Can I Kick It?" is a song by American hip-hop group A Tribe Called Quest, released in October 1990 by Jive Records as the third single from their debut album, People's Instinctive Travels and the Paths of Rhythm (1990). The song, which has a call and response chorus, was recorded in 1989, when the group members were aged 18–19. "Can I Kick It?" contains samples of "Walk on the Wild Side" by Lou Reed, "What a Waste" by Ian Dury and the Blockheads, "Spinning Wheel" by Dr. Lonnie Smith, "Dance of the Knights" by Sergei Prokofiev and "Sunshower" by Dr. Buzzard's Original Savannah Band. Phife Dawg has stated that, because of the use of the "Walk on the Wild Side" sample, the group did not receive any money from the single, with Lou Reed instead claiming the profits. The accompanying music video for the song was directed by Jim Swaffield and filmed in New York City, featuring among others De La Soul.

"Can I Kick It?", considered one of the group's signature songs, also appears on the band's 1999 compilation album The Anthology, with the outro of "Bonita Applebum" added to the beginning of the song. In 2012, NME ranked the song number 90 in their list of the "100 Best Songs of the 1990s".

== Critical reception ==
Larry Flick from Billboard magazine felt that "inspired use of samples from Lou Reed's 'Walk on the Wild Side' nicely complements Tribe's relaxed and confident rhyming." Everett True from Melody Maker wrote, "A natural, laidback and funking. There's a little Ian Dury in here, some Dvorak, maybe, and a whole bunch of scratching. And there's that sumptuous four-note bass line from Lou Reed's 'Walk on the Wild Side', which could have been written for this. 'Mmm, how do you say?' a girl asks. 'A Tribe Called Quest', the dudes cut back in. 'Can I Kick It?' the man asks hesitatingly, while the chorus joyously answers him in the affirmative. Neat kickback echo on the drum beat. Smooth. A natural. Lovin' it." A reviewer from Music & Media found that the New York rap crew "proves their music can be 'double -streetwise'", describing the song as "two-dimensional rap".

Simon Williams from NME commented, "If half the task of chaps like these is to unearth a few wholesome samples from the historical vaults then A Tribe Called Quest score a Full House on the Bingometer. Vanilla Ice got halfway there and then blew it all by bein' a whiteboy wanker, but the Tribe heartily credit L Reed for stretching his 'Walk on the Wild Side' across a loping backbeat and then adding snatches of the Blockheads' 'What a Waste' with some snoozy, cerebral rapping." Gary Crossing from Record Mirror stated, "You can't go far wrong with this groovy little shanty." He also declared it a "masterpiece of contemporary popular music." Caroline Sullivan from Smash Hits said, "They've had the sense to nick the bass line from the elderly rock hit 'Walk on the Wild Side', and it gives their effort a bit of slinky class."

== Music video ==
The music video for "Can I Kick It?" was directed by American music video director and video editor Jim Swaffield. It features A Tribe Called Quest and various others, including members of De La Soul, literally kicking the word "it" while rapping on a film set, a park (located under the Williamsburg Bridge in New York’s Lower East Side), and a construction site. On the film set, they are seen playing with the tittle of the "i" in "it". In the park, they are walking around and are flipping on top of the "it". The video also features the participants throwing drumsticks around and landing them on drums. A "flying record player" is featured, to play the Lou Reed sample. Additionally, the "Can I Kick It? (Spirit Mix)", which uses a different beat, plays throughout the video.

== Impact and legacy ==
In 2012, NME ranked "Can I Kick It?" number 90 in their list of the "100 Best Songs of the 1990s", naming it a "laidback chant-a-long". In 2017 and 2021, Rolling Stone included it in their lists of "100 Greatest Hip-Hop Songs of All Time" and "The 500 Greatest Songs of All Time" at No. 77 and No. 292. In 2022, Pitchfork ranked it number 25 in their list of "The 250 Best Songs of the 1990s". In 2023, Billboard ranked "Can I Kick It?" number 50 in their list of "The 100 Best Pop Songs Never to Hit the Hot 100", stating that "the Lou Reed-sampling single helped establish the playful, inventive style of one of the greatest rap groups of the ’90s — and also gave the genre one of its all-time call-and-response hooks." Same year, PureWow ranked it number 20 in their list of "The 53 Best 90s Songs of All Time". In 2024, Esquire ranked it number 25 in their "The 50 Best Songs of the ’90s".

The song was featured on the soundtrack to Tony Hawk's Pro Skater 1 + 2, a remake of the first 2 Tony Hawk games Tony Hawk’s Pro Skater and Tony Hawk’s Pro Skater 2. It was used at the start of the 2021 film Tom & Jerry being performed by a flock of pigeons, for the end credits for Teenage Mutant Ninja Turtles: Mutant Mayhem in 2023, and for the Paramount+ series Knuckles.

In the second verse, Phife Dawg refers to former New York City mayor David Dinkins, the city's first African-American mayor: "Mr. Dinkins, would you please be my mayor?" The song was recorded before Dinkins was elected to office.

DJ Premier and Samara Cyn released a cover of the song in July 2026 for a Major League Soccer promotion.

== Track listing ==
12" and cassette single, US (1990)
No.	Title	Length
1.	"Can I Kick It?" (Spirit Mix)	4:11
2.	"Can I Kick It?" (Radio Edit)	3:23
3.	"Can I Kick It?" (Phase 5 Mix)	4:33
4.	"Can I Kick It?" (Spirits)	2:02
5.	"If the Papes Come"	5:46
6.	"If the Papes Come" (Remix)	4:14
7.	"Can I Kick It?" (LP Version)	4:11

12" single, UK (1990)
No.	Title	Length
1.	"Can I Kick It?" (Extended Boilerhouse Mix)	6:40
2.	"Can I Kick It?" (Phase 5 Mix)	4:33
3.	"Can I Kick It?" (LP Version)	4:11
4.	"If the Papes Come" (Remix)	4:14

7" and cassette single, UK (1990)
No.	Title	Length
1.	"Can I Kick It?" (Boilerhouse Mix)	3:54
2.	"Can I Kick It?" (7" Radio Edit)	3:26

CD single, UK (1990)
No.	Title	Length
1.	"Can I Kick It?" (7" Radio Edit)	3:26
2.	"Can I Kick It?" (Extended Boilerhouse Mix)	6:40
3.	"Can I Kick It?" (Phase 5 Mix)	4:33
4.	"If the Papes Come" (Remix)	4:14

Six Wicked Mixes, Germany (1991)
No.	Title	Length
1.	"Can I Kick It?" (Boilerhouse Mix)	4:18
2.	"Can I Kick It?" (Extended Boilerhouse Mix)	6:40
3.	"Can I Kick It?" (U.S. Spirit Mix)	4:14
4.	"Can I Kick It?" (Album Version)	4:14
5.	"Can I Kick It?" (Phase 5 Mix)	4:21
6.	"Can I Kick It?" (U.S. Edit)	3:23

CD single, UK (1992 reissue)
No.	Title	Length
1.	"Can I Kick It?" (Extended Boilerhouse Mix)	6:40
2.	"Can I Kick It?" (Phase 5 Mix)	4:33
3.	"Hot Sex" (Album Version)	2:45
4.	"Hot Sex" (Instrumental Version)	2:45

12" single, UK (1992 reissue)
No.	Title	Length
1.	"Can I Kick It?" (7" Radio Edit)	3:26
2.	"Hot Sex" (Radio Version)	2:48
3.	"Can I Kick It?" (Extended Boilerhouse Mix)	6:40
4.	"Can I Kick It?" (Instrumental)	4:11

== Charts ==
=== Weekly charts ===
Chart (1991)	Peak position
Australia (ARIA)	152
Israel (Israeli Singles Chart)	27
Luxembourg (Radio Luxembourg)	11
Netherlands (Dutch Top 40)	13
Netherlands (Single Top 100)	13
UK Singles (OCC)	15
UK Airplay (Music Week)	43
UK Dance (Music Week)	1
US Hot Rap Songs (Billboard)	8

=== Year-end charts ===
Chart (1991)	Position
UK Club Chart (Record Mirror)	22

== Certifications ==
Region	Certification	Certified units/sales
United Kingdom (BPI)	Gold	400,000^{‡}
^{‡} Sales+streaming figures based on certification alone.
