= Revised Quest for the Seasoned Traveller =

Compilation album by A Tribe Called Quest
- Released: June 1992
- Recorded: 1989–1991
- Genre: Alternative hip hop
- Label: Jive/BMG Records; 74321-11705 (Europe); 01241-44150 (Canada)

A Tribe Called Quest chronology
The Low End Theory (1991)	Revised Quest for the Seasoned Traveller (1992)	Midnight Marauders (1993)

Professional ratings
Review scores
Source	Rating
Allmusic	3/5 stars
The Encyclopedia of Popular Music	2/5 stars

Revised Quest for the Seasoned Traveller is a compilation of rare material released by A Tribe Called Quest in 1992.

"Can I Kick It?" (Boilerhouse Remix)" and "Luck of Lucien (Tom And Jerry Remix)" were released as singles only in UK.

== Track listing ==
1. "Bonita Applebum (12-Inch Why Edit)" – 5:33
2. "I Left My Wallet in El Segundo (Vampire Mix)" – 5:57
3. "Description of a Fool (Talkie)" – 3:07
4. "Pubic Enemy (Saturday Night Virus Discomix)" – 4:19
5. "Check the Rhime (Mr. Muhammad's Mix)" – 3:40
6. "Luck of Lucien (Main Mix)" – 7:10
7. "Can I Kick It? (Extended Boilerhouse Mix)" – 6:40
8. "Scenario (Young Nation Mix)" – 5:10
9. "If the Papes Come (Remix)" – 4:18
10. "Jazz (We've Got) (Re-Recording)" – 4:20
11. "Butter (Hip Hop Mix)" – 3:58
12. "Bonita Applebum (Hootie Mix)" – 3:16
