= Find a Way (A Tribe Called Quest song) =

Single by A Tribe Called Quest

from the album The Love Movement
- B-side: "Steppin' It Up"
- Released: August 25, 1998
- Recorded: 1997
- Genre: Alternative hip-hop
- Length: 3:24
- Label: Jive
- Songwriters: Kamaal Fareed; Malik Taylor; Ali Shaheed Muhammad; James Yancey; Towa Tei; Bebel Gilberto
- Producer: The Ummah

A Tribe Called Quest singles chronology
"Stressed Out" (1996)	"Find a Way" (1998)	"Like It Like That" (1998)

Audio sample
- Find a Way: file; help

Music video
- "Find a Way" on YouTube

"Find a Way" is a song by A Tribe Called Quest, the first single from their fifth album The Love Movement. The New York Times' Ben Ratliff wrote that "Find a Way" "innocently wonders about the point at which friendship spills over into sex."

== Production ==
According to The Love Movement's liner notes, the track features production "initiated by JD of The Ummah." The track contained samples from "Technova" by Towa Tei from the album Future Listening!. In 1990, Q-Tip was featured on the hit single "Groove Is in the Heart" by Deee-Lite, a group that Towa Tei was involved with until 1996.

== Music video ==
The video starts to Alicante, Spain in outer space, with a wide view of Earth that is later revealed to be a decoration in Ali Shaheed Muhammad's car. Ali spots three girls, and Q-Tip decides to flirt with all three. A scene of Alicante appears and shows the group walking on the beach while Phife Dawg is rapping. Next, the scene changes to a party, showing Q-Tip experiencing a romantic moment. From there, the video shifts to an art museum where Q-Tip is talking to his girl. The video then returns to Phife Dawg on the beach, telling a girl that he will do what she wants. The video ends with the group in a club, dancing with women and having fun. During the final chorus, the video pans once again to outer space, then shows the group sleeping in Ali's car. There is an iconic sing-along style bouncing ball each time the chorus plays.

== Weekly charts ==
Chart (1998)	Peak position
Australia (ARIA)	182
Scottish Singles Sales (Official Charts)	75
UK Dance (Official Charts)	5
UK Hip Hop/R&B (Official Charts)	12
UK Singles (Official Charts)	41
US Billboard Hot 100	71
US Hot R&B/Hip-Hop Songs (Billboard)	29
US Hot Rap Songs (Billboard)	18

=== Year-end charts ===
Chart (1998)	Position
UK Urban (Music Week)	17
