= List of Billboard 200 number-one albums of 1996 =

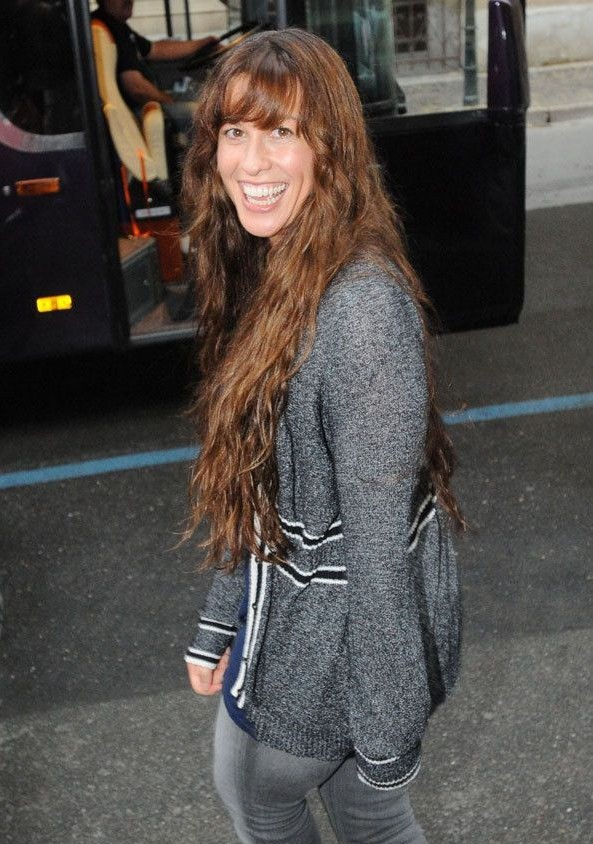
Jagged Little Pill by Alanis Morissette was the best-selling album of 1996.

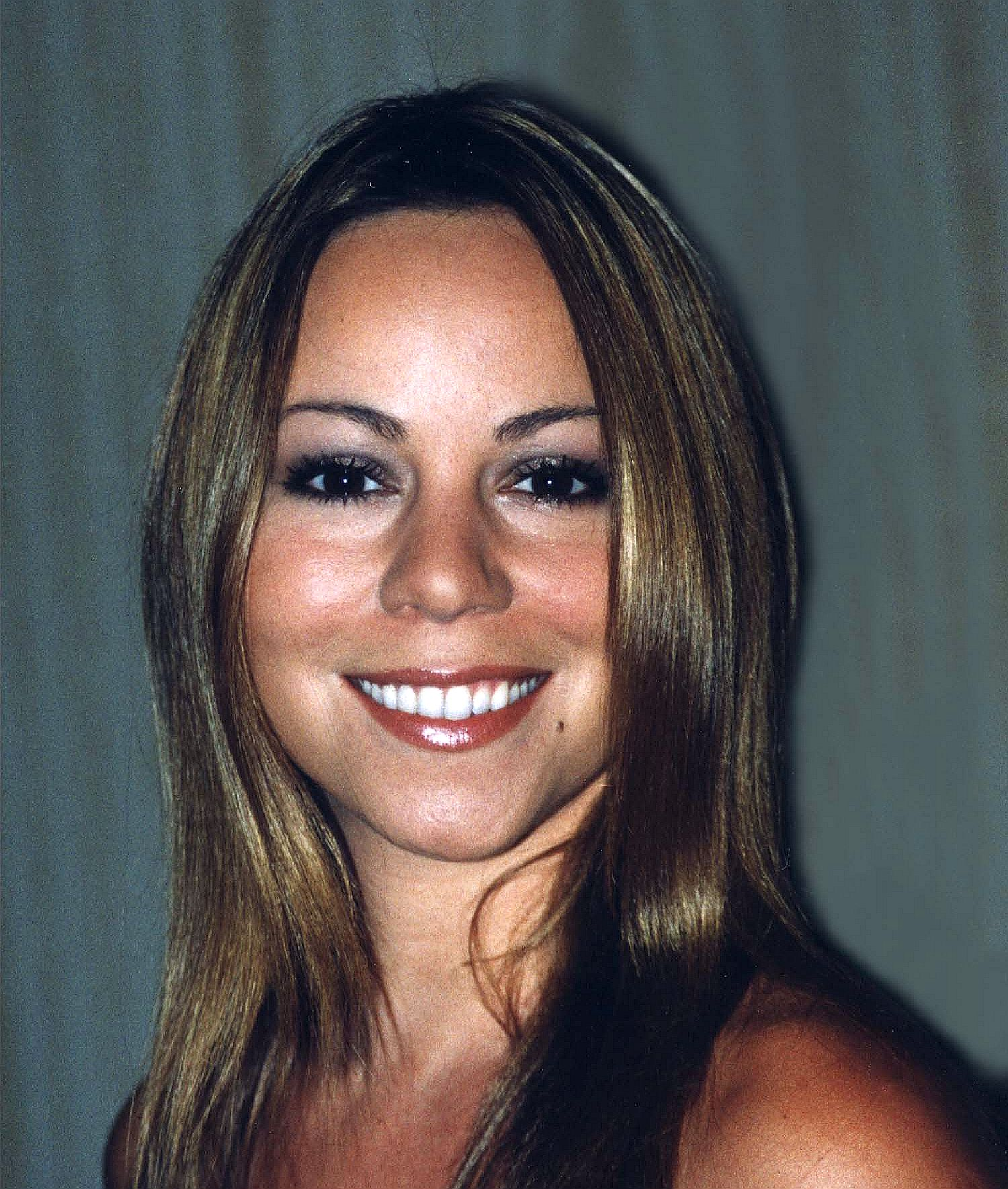
Daydream by Mariah Carey had the biggest sales week of 1996.

These are the Billboard magazine number-one albums of 1996, per the Billboard 200.

== Chart history ==
Key
†	Indicates best performing album of 1996

Issue date	Album	Artist(s)	Label	Sales	Ref.
January 6	Daydream	Mariah Carey	Columbia	760,000	
January 13	Daydream	Mariah Carey	Columbia	414,000	
January 20	Waiting to Exhale	Soundtrack	Arista	231,000	
January 27	Waiting to Exhale	Soundtrack	Arista	174,000	
February 3	Waiting to Exhale	Soundtrack	Arista	159,000	
February 10	Waiting to Exhale	Soundtrack	Arista	131,000	
February 17	Waiting to Exhale	Soundtrack	Arista	118,000	
February 24	Jagged Little Pill †	Alanis Morissette	Maverick	132,000	
March 2	All Eyez on Me	2Pac	Death Row	566,500	
March 9	All Eyez on Me	2Pac	Death Row	315,000	
March 16	Jagged Little Pill †	Alanis Morissette	Maverick	241,000	
March 23	Jagged Little Pill †	Alanis Morissette	Maverick	251,000	
March 30	Jagged Little Pill †	Alanis Morissette	Maverick	233,000	
April 6	Anthology 2	The Beatles	Apple	441,000	
April 13	Jagged Little Pill †	Alanis Morissette	Maverick	213,000	
April 20	Jagged Little Pill †	Alanis Morissette	Maverick	254,000	
April 27	Jagged Little Pill †	Alanis Morissette	Maverick	200,000	
May 4	Evil Empire	Rage Against the Machine	Epic	249,000	
May 11	Fairweather Johnson	Hootie & the Blowfish	Atlantic	411,000	
May 18	Fairweather Johnson	Hootie & the Blowfish	Atlantic	259,000	
May 25	The Score	Fugees	Ruffhouse	206,000	
June 1	The Score	Fugees	Ruffhouse	189,000	
June 8	The Score	Fugees	Ruffhouse	180,000	
June 15	The Score	Fugees	Ruffhouse	179,000	
June 22	Load	Metallica	Elektra	680,000	
June 29	Load	Metallica	Elektra	302,000	
July 6	Load	Metallica	Elektra	219,000	
July 13	Load	Metallica	Elektra	172,000	
July 20	It Was Written	Nas	Columbia	269,000	
July 27	It Was Written	Nas	Columbia	161,000	
August 3	It Was Written	Nas	Columbia	144,000	
August 10	It Was Written	Nas	Columbia	132,000	
August 17	Beats, Rhymes and Life	A Tribe Called Quest	Jive	173,000	
August 24	Jagged Little Pill †	Alanis Morissette	Maverick	121,000	
August 31	Jagged Little Pill †	Alanis Morissette	Maverick	120,000	
September 7	Jagged Little Pill †	Alanis Morissette	Maverick	115,000	
September 14	No Code	Pearl Jam	Epic	366,500	
September 21	No Code	Pearl Jam	Epic	146,000	
September 28	Home Again	New Edition	MCA	227,000	
October 5	Falling into You	Celine Dion	550 Music	132,000	
October 12	Falling into You	Celine Dion	550 Music	131,000	
October 19	From the Muddy Banks of the Wishkah	Nirvana	DGC	158,000	
October 26	Falling into You	Celine Dion	550 Music	136,000	
November 2	Recovering the Satellites	Counting Crows	Geffen	160,000	
November 9	Best Of Volume I	Van Halen	Warner Bros	233,000	
November 16	Anthology 3	The Beatles	Apple	236,000	
November 23	The Don Killuminati: The 7 Day Theory	Makaveli	Death Row	664,000	
November 30	Tha Doggfather	Snoop Doggy Dogg	Death Row	478,971	
December 7	Razorblade Suitcase	Bush	Trauma	295,000	
December 14	Razorblade Suitcase	Bush	Trauma	200,000	
December 21	Tragic Kingdom	No Doubt	Trauma	229,000	
December 28	Tragic Kingdom	No Doubt	Trauma	329,000	

== See also ==
- 1996 in music
- List of number-one albums (United States)
