= The Love Movement =

Studio album by A Tribe Called Quest
- Released: September 29, 1998
- Recorded: 1997−1998
- Studios: Sony Music Studios, The Hit Factory, Battery Studios and River Sound in New York City
- Genres: East Coast hip-hop; alternative hip-hop; jazz rap
- Length: 48:10; 73:44 (with bonus tracks)
- Label: Jive
- Producers: The Ummah; Bay-Lloyd

A Tribe Called Quest chronology
Beats, Rhymes and Life (1996)	The Love Movement (1998)	We Got It from Here... Thank You 4 Your Service (2016)

Singles from The Love Movement
- 1. "Find a Way" Released: August 25, 1998; 2. "Like It Like That" Released: 1998

The Love Movement is the fifth studio album by American hip-hop group A Tribe Called Quest, and their last album released during group member Phife Dawg's lifetime. Released on September 29, 1998, by Jive Records, it is a concept album, exploring the lyrical theme of love. Musically, it is a continuation of the group's previous album, Beats, Rhymes and Life, featuring minimalist R&B and jazz-oriented production by The Ummah. The lead single, "Find a Way", charted on the Billboard Hot 100 and was followed by a second single, "Like It Like That". The album debuted at number three on the Billboard 200 and was certified gold by the Recording Industry Association of America (RIAA) on November 1, 1998. The group announced its disbandment a month before the album's release.

== Background ==
The roots of The Love Movement trace back to early 1997, when Q-Tip produced a beat intended for The Notorious B.I.G.'s album Life After Death. The Notorious B.I.G. enjoyed the beat when it was played for him, however, Life After Death had already been completed and the beat was not used before his death later that year. Eventually, the beat was used for the song "The Love" on The Love Movement.

The album was originally slated for release in May 1998. However, on February 7, 1998, a fire at Q-Tip's home recording studio destroyed his entire record collection and a computer containing many unreleased songs by the group, including collaborations with producer Jay Dee, delaying the album until September of that year. A month before the album's release, the group announced that it was disbanding.

== Music and lyrics ==
The Love Movement is a continuation of the stripped-down R&B and jazz-infused sound that The Ummah created on Beats, Rhymes and Life. The album contains an instrumental track, "4 Moms", which features a guitar solo by jazz guitarist Chalmers "Spanky" Alford. Lyrically, love is the album's predominant theme, while Q-Tip and Phife Dawg were noted for their "mature", "subtle" and "laid-back" rhymes. The featured rappers were given praise for making the album sound "livelier", as it was criticized for being "a little monotonous" overall. Thomas Golianopoulos of Spin hailed the single "Find a Way" as the group's "final glorious moment" before breaking up.

== Artwork ==
For the cover, art director Nick Gamma, who had created the hand lettering for their first two albums, selected symbols that represented sexual positions from the Kama Sutra.

== Reception ==
Professional ratings
Review scores
Source	Rating
AllMusic	3.5/5 stars
Encyclopedia of Popular Music	3/5 stars
Entertainment Weekly	B+
NME	7/10
Rolling Stone	3/5 stars
The Source	3.5/5 stars
Spin	4/10
Tom Hull – on the Web	B+
The Village Voice	(choice cut)

The Love Movement debuted at number three on the Billboard 200 and was certified gold by the Recording Industry Association of America (RIAA), on November 1, 1998, with shipments of 500,000 copies in the United States.

The album received mostly positive reviews from music critics. Josef Woodard of Entertainment Weekly described it as "a slamming, seductively textured, and tough display of virtuosic rhyming and tale spinning." Dele Fadele of NME praised it for demonstrating "the continued survival of hip-hop as an artform", calling the album's songs "drug-free psychedelic experiences in which subsonic bass and weird-sounding beats play a large part." Rolling Stone's Rob Sheffield believed that the "mature, accomplished niceness" of the album "proves that the Tribe still have the skills — they're just short on thrills." In a negative review, Tim Haslett of Spin wrote that the spontaneity that made The Low End Theory "so much fun" had been "replaced by a shiny patina and a flabby George Benson-esque seriousness, so that the record feels like it was conceived and executed around a major-label conference table."

In a review for AllMusic, critic Stephen Thomas Erlewine noted that "there are plenty of pleasures to be had from careful listening" of the album, and despite its love concept, he felt that "the overall effect is quite similar" to Beats, Rhymes and Life. Nathan Rabin of The A.V. Club stated, "While not as immediately accessible as Tribe's first three albums, it's still consistently solid enough to stand up to repeat listens."

The Love Movement was nominated for a Grammy Award for Best Rap Album, presented at the 41st Grammy Awards in 1999.

== Track listing ==
- All songs produced by The Ummah, except track 11 produced by The Ummah and Bay-Lloyd.

No.	Title	Writer(s)	Length
1.	"Start It Up"	Kamaal Fareed; Ali Shaheed Muhammad; Malik Taylor; James Yancey; Ben Bernie; Kenneth Casey; Maceo Pinkard	3:18
2.	"Find a Way"	Fareed; Muhammad; Taylor; Yancey; Bebel Gilberto; Towa Tei	3:23
3.	"Da Booty"	Fareed; Muhammad; Taylor; Yancey	3:20
4.	"Steppin' It Up" (featuring Busta Rhymes & Redman)	Fareed; Muhammad; Taylor; Yancey; Trevor Smith Jr.; Reggie Noble	3:21
5.	"Like It Like That"	Fareed; Muhammad; Taylor	2:46
6.	"Common Ground (Get It Goin' On)"	Fareed; Muhammad; Taylor	2:49
7.	"4 Moms" (featuring Spanky)	Fareed; Muhammad; Taylor; Yancey	1:49
8.	"His Name Is Mutty Ranks"	Fareed; Muhammad; Taylor; Yancey	1:56
9.	"Give Me" (featuring Noreaga)	Fareed; Muhammad; Taylor; Victor Santiago Jr.; Dallas Austin; Michael Bivins; Shawn Stockman; Nathan Morris; Sam Jones	3:52
10.	"Pad & Pen" (featuring D-Life)	Fareed; Muhammad; Taylor; Ronnie Wilson; Oliver Scott	3:23
11.	"Busta's Lament"	Fareed; Muhammad; Taylor; Yancey	2:38
12.	"Hot 4 U"	Fareed; Muhammad; Taylor; Leon Sylvers III; Joseph Sylvers	3:15
13.	"Against the World"	Fareed; Muhammad; Taylor; Yancey; James Smith; Dwayne Simon; Brian Latture	3:58
14.	"The Love"	Fareed; Muhammad; Taylor; Douglas Davis; Richard Walters	4:02
15.	"Rock Rock Y'all" (featuring Punchline, Jane Doe, Wordsworth & Mos Def)	Fareed; Muhammad; Taylor; Rashaan Truell; Latania Morris; Vinson Johnson; Dante Smith; Charles Wright; James Gadson	4:17
Total length:			48:10

Bonus tracks
No.	Title	Writer(s)	Length
16.	"Scenario (Remix)" (featuring Kid Hood & Leaders of the New School)	Fareed; Muhammad; Taylor; Troy Hall; Bryan Higgins; James Jackson; Sheldon Scott; Smith Jr.	5:17
17.	"Money Maker"	Fareed; Muhammad; Taylor	4:22
18.	"Hot Sex"	Fareed; Muhammad; Taylor	2:45
19.	"Oh My God (Remix)"	Fareed; Muhammad; Taylor	4:01
20.	"Jazz (We've Got) (Re-Recording Radio)"	Fareed; Muhammad; Taylor	4:18
21.	"One Two Shit" (featuring Busta Rhymes)	Fareed; Muhammad; Taylor; Smith Jr.	4:31
Total length:			73:44

Japan bonus track – Jive/Avex Group AVCZ-95108
No.	Title	Length
22.	"The Night He Got Caught"	3:10
Total length:		76:54

Notes

- Tracks 1–4, 7, 8, 11, and 13 credited as "initiated by JD of The Ummah".

== Samples ==
Start It Up

- "Sweet Georgia Brown" by The Singers Unlimited

Find a Way

- "Technova" by Towa Tei
- "Flash It to the Beat" by Grandmaster Flash and the Furious Five

Steppin' It Up

- "Leo: Rosebud" by Cannonball Adderley

Give Me

- "Give Me" by I-Level
- "Motownphilly" by Boyz II Men

Pad & Pen

- "Yearning for Your Love" by The Gap Band
- "Graduate Medley" by Gap Mangione

Busta's Lament

- "Goin' Through Changes" by Feather

Hot 4 U

- "New Horizons" by The Sylvers

Against the World

- "Jingling Baby" by LL Cool J

The Love

- "La Di Da Di" by Doug E. Fresh and Slick Rick
- "Little Sunflower" by Freddie Hubbard

Rock Rock Y'all

- "What Can You Bring Me" by Charles Wright & the Watts 103rd Street Rhythm Band

== Personnel ==
Credits are adapted from AllMusic.

- A Tribe Called Quest – primary artist
- Busta Rhymes – guest artist
- D-Life – guest artist
- Jane Doe – guest artist
- Mos Def – guest artist
- Noreaga – guest artist
- Punchline – guest artist
- Redman – guest artist
- Spanky – guest artist, guitar
- Wordsworth – guest artist
- Q-Tip – composer
- James Yancey (Jay Dee) – composer
- Ali Shaheed Muhammad – composer
- Phife Dawg – composer
- The Ummah – engineer, mixing, production
- David Kennedy – engineer, mixing
- Tom Coyne – mastering
- Nick Gamma – art direction, design
- Ron Croudy – design
- Pascal Lewis – make-up
- Robert Maxwell – photography

== Charts and certifications ==
=== Weekly charts ===
Chart (1998)	Peak position
Australian Albums (ARIA)	133
Canadian Albums (Billboard)	2
Canadian R&B Albums (SoundScan)	2
French Albums (SNEP)	40
German Albums (Offizielle Top 100)	36
Swedish Albums (Sverigetopplistan)	45
UK Albums (Official Charts)	38
UK Independent Albums (Official Charts)	5
UK R&B Albums (Official Charts)	3
US Billboard 200	3
US Top R&B/Hip-Hop Albums (Billboard)	3

=== Year-end charts ===
Chart (1998)	Position
Canadian Albums (SoundScan)	197
Canadian R&B Albums (SoundScan)	29
US Billboard 200	187
US Top R&B/Hip-Hop Albums (Billboard)	77

=== Certifications ===
Region	Certification	Certified units/sales
Canada (Music Canada)	Gold	50,000^{^}
United States (RIAA)	Gold	500,000^{^}
^{^} Shipments figures based on certification alone.
