= Like It Like That (A Tribe Called Quest song) =

Single by A Tribe Called Quest

from the album The Love Movement
- B-side: "Pad & Pen"
- Released: 1998
- Genre: Alternative hip-hop
- Length: 2:46
- Label: Jive
- Songwriters: Kamaal Fareed; Ali Shaheed Muhammad; Malik Taylor
- Producer: The Ummah

A Tribe Called Quest singles chronology
"Find a Way" (1998)	"Like It Like That" (1998)	"We the People...." (2016)

"Like It Like That" is the second single by hip-hop group A Tribe Called Quest, from their album The Love Movement. The single was released solely as a promo-copy, had no music video, and received minimal radio airplay.

== Reception ==
Matt Kimmel of Western High School from Florida (via Sun-Sentinel) called this song his "personal favorite" and "a perfect jam that shows the group's true essence." He also wrote, "Smooth vocals, smart lyrics and amazing beats take your ears on a journey." Glide Magazine reviewer considered "Like It Like That" to be a sign that the Tribe made significant advancements to their sound for this album: "a wonky, droning drum pattern juxtaposed by a more vibrant and sharper drum pattern with the trio gliding over the awkward yet potent arrangement".

The song was listed on the CMJ New Music Report Beat Box top 40 chart for at least twelve weeks as of March 1, 1999. It peaked at number ten.

== Track listing ==
=== 12" single ===
A-side

1. "Like It Like That" (Radio Version)
2. "Like It Like That" (Album Version)
3. "Like It Like That" (Instrumental)

B-side

1. "Pad & Pen" (featuring D-Life) (Radio Version)
2. "Pad & Pen" (featuring D-Life) (Album Version)
3. "Pad & Pen" (Instrumental)
