= Jazz (We've Got) =

Single by A Tribe Called Quest

from the album The Low End Theory
- B-side: "Buggin' Out"
- Released: November 27, 1991
- Recorded: 1991
- Genre: Jazz rap
- Length: 4:09
- Label: Jive
- Songwriters: Kamaal Fareed; Ali Shaheed Muhammad; Malik Taylor; Bronisław Kaper; Ned Washington
- Producer: A Tribe Called Quest

A Tribe Called Quest singles chronology
| "Check the Rhime" (1991) | "Jazz (We've Got)" (1991) | "Scenario" (1992) |

Music video
- "Jazz (We've Got) Buggin' Out" on YouTube

"Jazz (We've Got)" is a song by American hip-hop group A Tribe Called Quest, released in November 1991 by Jive Records as the second single from their second album, The Low End Theory (1991). The original material sampled in the song was provided by Pete Rock, and was then recreated in a similar way by Q-Tip. Although Pete Rock is not officially credited, Q-Tip credits him in the outro of the track, rapping "Pete Rock for the beat, ya don't stop."

Rolling Stone lists "Jazz (We've Got)" on their list of 20 essential songs from the group. On their list of 10 lyrics that prove Phife Dawg's talent, Pitchfork included a rhyme from "Jazz (We've Got)": "Make sure you have a system with some phat house speakers / So the new shit can rock, from Bronx to Massapequa." The article notes that, "these kinds of stunt rhymes may not have been the most common component of Phife's lyrical arsenal, but they were usually the most 'oh shit' moments in any given verse, since they sounded so unexpected without really feeling forced."

== Music video ==
In the music video for "Jazz (We've Got)", directed by Jim Swaffield, the group travels around New York City while rapping about the beauty of jazz. Q-Tip starts off the first verse followed by Phife Dawg, who rhymes after the second chorus. After Q-Tip's second verse, he pauses and says, "now check it out", at which point the music stops and Ali asks, "Check what out?". Phife answers, "Check this out", and the video shifts into color for "Buggin' Out" with Phife beginning to rap his verse. This was the first time a track cut into its B-side within a single music video. During the "Buggin' Out" sequence, the two rappers are seen wearing eye caps that make their eyeballs appear to be very large. Half way through the song, the music stops, and the video once again cuts back to black and white, with Q-Tip finishing his rhyme from "Buggin' Out" a cappella.

== Remix ==
A remix (called a "Re-Recording") was done for "Jazz (We've Got)" and was featured on The Love Movement and Revised Quest for the Seasoned Traveller. "Your mic & my mic, come on, yo, no equal”, a Q-Tip line on "Jazz (We've Got) (Re-Recording)" can be heard in the chorus on "No Equal" by The Beatnuts from their 1993 EP Intoxicated Demons: The EP.

== Samples ==
- "Green Dolphin Street" by Jimmy McGriff
- "Don't Change Your Love" by Five Stairsteps
- "Long Red" by Mountain [sample appears on remix only]
- "Sing a Simple Song" by Sly and the Family Stone [sample appears on remix only]
- "Suite Sioux" by Freddie Hubbard [sample appears on remix only]
- "Devastatement" by Cannonball Adderley Quintet [sample appears on remix only]

== Charts ==
| Chart (1992) | Peak position |
|---|---|
| UK Dance (Music Week) | 49 |
| US Hot Rap Songs (Billboard) | 19 |
