= I Left My Wallet in El Segundo =

1990 single by A Tribe Called Quest

Single by A Tribe Called Quest

from the album People's Instinctive Travels and the Paths of Rhythm
- B-side: "Pubic Enemy"
- Released: March 17, 1990
- Genre: Alternative hip-hop
- Length: 4:05
- Label: Jive
- Songwriters: Kamaal Fareed; Ali Shaheed Muhammad
- Producer: A Tribe Called Quest

A Tribe Called Quest singles chronology
"Description Of A Fool" (1989)	"I Left My Wallet in El Segundo" (1990)	"Bonita Applebum" (1990)

Audio sample
- I Left My Wallet in El Segundo: file; help

Music video
- "I Left My Wallet in El Segundo" on YouTube

"I Left My Wallet in El Segundo" is a song by American hip-hop group A Tribe Called Quest, released in March 1990 by Jive Records as the debut single from their first album, People's Instinctive Travels and the Paths of Rhythm (1990). The song contains a sample of "Funky" by The Chambers Brothers as the main hook.

== Critical reception ==
James Hamilton from Record Mirror felt that "this mildly amusing story telling slow rap was always at times raggamuffin accented amidst the Mexican coloring of its subject matter, and is more so than ever now that it's out here again in Norman Cook's brand new bassily booming Vampire Mix (92 1/2bpm)". Rolling Stone included the song on their list of 20 essential songs from the group, noting, "[Q-Tip] precisely describes every aspect of an ill-fated road trip...Not bad for a kid barely out of his teens rapping about an exotic-sounding place he learned about from its use as a frequent punch line on Sanford and Son."

== Music video ==
The entire music video for "I Left My Wallet in El Segundo" is narrated. The group finds themselves at a police station where Q-Tip begins his story. The tale starts with Q-Tip's mother winning a game show prize and leaving on a month-long cruise trip. After her departure, Q-Tip calls Ali and they take a road trip across America in Q-Tip's mother's car. The group gets lost on the way and Q-Tip asks a four-foot tall person with a sombrero for directions. Then, at a nearby pub, Q-Tip is distracted by an attractive woman and forgets his wallet before they leave. The waitress then takes his wallet off the counter. They return home and Q-Tip drops off Ali. Only then does Q-Tip realize that his wallet is missing and he rounds up the group to get it back. When they get back to El Segundo, California they want to stay longer, and the video fades out.

== Tracklist ==
Original version

- 7" single
1. "Pubic Enemy" (Radio) (3:45)
2. "I Left My Wallet in El Segundo" (Radio) (4:11)
- 12" and cassette single
1. "I Left My Wallet in El Segundo" (Feature Length) (5:05)
2. "I Left My Wallet in El Segundo" (Talkie) (4:10)
3. "I Left My Wallet in El Segundo" (Silent) (4:08)
4. "Pubic Enemy" (Saturday Night Virus Discomix) (4:16)
5. "Pubic Enemy" (Talkie) (3:45)
6. "Pubic Enemy" (Silent) (3:46)
- 12" promo
1. "I Left My Wallet in El Segundo" (Extended) (5:05)
2. "I Left My Wallet in El Segundo" (Radio) (4:10)
3. "I Left My Wallet in El Segundo" (Instrumental) (4:08)
4. "Pubic Enemy" (Extended) (4:16)
5. "Pubic Enemy" (Radio) (3:45)
6. "Pubic Enemy" (Instrumental) (3:46)
- UK 12" maxi
1. "Pubic Enemy" (Saturday Night Virus Disco Mix) (4:16)
2. "I Left My Wallet in El Segundo" (Extended) (4:35)
3. "Pubic Enemy" (Silent) (3:46)
4. "I Left My Wallet in El Segundo" (Silent) (4:07)
5. "I Left My Wallet in El Segundo" (Excerpt) (0:32)
- UK CD maxi
1. "Pubic Enemy (Radio Version) (3:49)
2. "I Left My Wallet in El Segundo" (Radio) (4:13)
3. "I Left My Wallet in El Segundo" (Excerpt) (0:33)
4. "Pubic Enemy" (Extended) (4:17)
5. "I Left My Wallet in El Segundo" (Extended) (4:35)
- CD promo
1. "I Left My Wallet in El Segundo" (Radio) (4:10)
2. "I Left My Wallet in El Segundo" (Extended) (4:35)
3. "I Left My Wallet in El Segundo" (Instrumental) (4:08)

Norman Cook remix

- 7" and cassette single
1. "I Left My Wallet in El Segundo" (3:42)
2. "I Left My Wallet in El Segundo" (Talkie) (4:10)
- 12" single
1. "I Left My Wallet in El Segundo" (Vampire Mix) (5:54)
2. "I Left My Wallet in El Segundo" (Talkie) (4:10)
3. "I Left My Wallet in El Segundo" (Silent) (4:08)
- 12" Independence version
1. "I Left My Wallet in El Segundo" (Independence Mix) (5:38)
2. "I Left My Wallet in El Segundo" (Drum Pan Mix) (5:52)
- CD single
1. "I Left My Wallet in El Segundo" (3:42)
2. "I Left My Wallet in El Segundo" (Vampire Mix) (5:54)
3. "I Left My Wallet in El Segundo" (Talkie) (4:10)
4. "I Left My Wallet in El Segundo" (Silent) (4:08)

== Charts ==
Chart (1990–1991)	Peak position
Netherlands (Dutch Top 40) Norman Cook remix	28
Netherlands (Single Top 100) Norman Cook remix	23
UK Singles (OCC)	86
UK Dance (Music Week)	29
UK Club Chart (Record Mirror)	17
US Dance Singles Sales (Billboard)	49
US Hot Rap Songs (Billboard)	9
