= Beats, Rhymes and Life =

Studio album by A Tribe Called Quest
- Released: July 30, 1996
- Recorded: 1995–1996
- Studio: Battery Studios (New York City)
- Genres: East Coast hip-hop; alternative hip-hop; jazz rap
- Length: 51:18
- Label: Jive
- Producers: The Ummah; Rashad Smith

A Tribe Called Quest chronology
Midnight Marauders (1993)	Beats, Rhymes and Life (1996)	The Love Movement (1998)

Singles from Beats, Rhymes and Life
- 1. "1nce Again" Released: July 1, 1996; 2. "Stressed Out" Released: November 11, 1996

Beats, Rhymes and Life is the fourth studio album by American hip-hop group A Tribe Called Quest. Released on July 30, 1996, by Jive Records, it followed three years after the highly regarded and successful Midnight Marauders. Produced by The Ummah, the album is a departure from the joyful, positive vibe of the group's earlier albums and is regarded as their darkest album in content. It debuted at number one on the Billboard 200 and was certified platinum by the Recording Industry Association of America (RIAA) on October 27, 1998.

== Background ==
In September 1993, shortly after the recording of Midnight Marauders had concluded, Phife Dawg moved to Atlanta. Along with Q-Tip's conversion to Islam the following year, the addition of Jay Dee to the group's new production team, The Ummah, and the enlistment of guest rapper Consequence, Q-Tip's cousin, the group dynamic changed drastically. Phife Dawg later stated that "the chemistry was dead, shot", while Q-Tip felt that becoming a Muslim "made the atmosphere much more serious."

== Music and lyrics ==
For Beats, Rhymes and Life, The Ummah created a minimalist sound reminiscent of The Low End Theory, which Ali Shaheed Muhammad described as "nothing extravagant, nothing far out." Miles Marshall Lewis of The Source praised The Ummah for being "the most proficient in the rap game at using samples as instruments in themselves." Regarding Jay Dee's five contributions to the album, Q-Tip stated, "He would just send me the beats and then I would lay them." One of his contributions, the lead single "1nce Again", was hailed as "one of the few successes" on the album and a "surprising R&B crossover."

Lyrically, the group addresses "everything from O.J. to spirituality" and were recognized for the complexity of their messages. However, they were criticized for sounding "bored", "confused, hostile, and occasionally paranoid." In the song "Keeping It Moving", Q-Tip responds to the diss comments made about him in MC Hammer's songs "Break 'Em Off Somethin' Proper" and "Funky Headhunter", as well as Westside Connection's song "Cross 'Em out and Put a K". In the first verse, he says that comments previously made about the West Coast were not intended to be a diss and that people should not misinterpret his lyrics.

== Reception ==
Professional ratings
Review scores
Source	Rating
AllMusic	3/5 stars
Encyclopedia of Popular Music	4/5 stars
Entertainment Weekly	A
NME	7/10
Q	4/5 stars
Rolling Stone	4/5 stars
The Source	4/5 stars
Spin	7/10
Tom Hull – on the Web	A−
USA Today	4/4 stars

Beats, Rhymes and Life debuted at number one on the Billboard 200 and was certified platinum by the Recording Industry Association of America (RIAA), on October 27, 1998, with shipments of one million copies in the United States, becoming the group's most commercially successful album.

The album received mostly positive reviews from music critics. Ernest Hardy of Rolling Stone called it "near-flawless", while commending The Ummah for their "irresistible" production, and the group for "spinning universal themes from an Afrocentric loom, with positivity balanced against subtly subversive street reporting." Entertainment Weekly's Cheo Tyehimba described it as "the return of playful yet potent hip-hop" and praised the "trademark originality" of the group's lyrics. Will Hermes of Spin credited the group for performing "with a sleight of hand that lets them get intelligent without ruining the party", however, he felt that "over the three fallow years since the group's last record, they've been dealing with a real crisis of musical faith." Robert Christgau gave the album a three-star honorable mention in his consumer guide for The Village Voice, noting that the group fights "sensationalist obscurity with philosophic subtlety", which he believed was ineffective. Christgau highlighted "Jam", "Crew" and "The Hop" as standout tracks.

In the 5th edition of his Encyclopedia of Popular Music, Colin Larkin praised the group's "highly evolved" lyrics and lauded them for "addressing issues with greater philosophy than the crude banter of their past recordings." Despite calling the album "the group's most disappointing listen", John Bush of AllMusic credited it as "a dedication to the streets and the hip-hop underground."

Beats, Rhymes and Life was nominated for a Grammy Award for Best Rap Album and "1nce Again" was nominated for a Grammy Award for Best Rap Performance by a Duo or Group, presented at the 39th Grammy Awards in 1997.

== Track listing ==
- All tracks produced by the Ummah, except track 9 produced by Rashad Smith.

No.	Title	Writer(s)	Length
1.	"Phony Rappers"	Kamaal Fareed; Malik Taylor; Dexter Mills Jr.	3:35
2.	"Get a Hold"	Fareed; James Yancey	3:35
3.	"Motivators"	Fareed; Ali Shaheed Muhammad; Taylor; Mills	3:20
4.	"Jam"	Fareed; Taylor; Mills	4:38
5.	"Crew"	Fareed; Muhammad	1:58
6.	"The Pressure"	Fareed; Muhammad; Taylor	3:02
7.	"1nce Again" (featuring Tammy Lucas)	Fareed; Muhammad; Taylor; Yancey; Steve Swallow	3:49
8.	"Mind Power"	Fareed; Muhammad; Taylor; Mills	3:55
9.	"The Hop"	Fareed; Taylor; Rashad Smith	3:27
10.	"Keeping It Moving"	Fareed; Yancey	3:38
11.	"Baby Phife's Return"	Fareed; Taylor	3:18
12.	"Separate/Together"	Fareed	1:38
13.	"What Really Goes On"	Fareed; Leroy Bonner; Greg Webster; Andrew Noland; Marshall Jones; Ralph Middlebrooks; Walter Morrison; Marvin Pierce; Bruce Napier	3:23
14.	"Word Play"	Fareed; Taylor; Mills; Yancey	2:59
15.	"Stressed Out" (featuring Faith Evans)	Fareed; Muhammad; Mills; Faith Evans; Yancey; Gary Taylor	4:57
Total length:			51:18

== Personnel ==
Credits are adapted from AllMusic.

- A Tribe Called Quest – primary artist
- Tammy Lucas – featured artist
- Faith Evans – composer, featured artist
- Consequence – composer, guest artist, vocals
- Pasemaster Mase – scratching (track 9)
- Ali Shaheed Muhammad – composer, DJ
- Phife Dawg – composer, vocals
- Q-Tip – composer, vocals
- James Yancey (Jay Dee) – composer
- Rashad Smith – producer
- The Ummah – mixing, producer
- Bob Power – mixing
- Tony Smalios – mixing
- Tom Coyne – mastering

== Charts ==
=== Weekly charts ===
Chart (1996)	Peak position
Australian Albums (ARIA)	136
Canada Top Albums/CDs (RPM)	7
New Zealand Albums (RMNZ)	32
Swedish Albums (Sverigetopplistan)	30
UK Albums (Official Charts)	28
US Billboard 200	1
US Top R&B/Hip-Hop Albums (Billboard)	1

=== Year-end charts ===
Chart (1996)	Position
US Billboard 200	111
US Top R&B/Hip-Hop Albums (Billboard)	31

== Certifications ==
Region	Certification	Certified units/sales
Canada (Music Canada)	Gold	50,000^{^}
United States (RIAA)	Platinum	1,000,000^{^}
^{^} Shipments figures based on certification alone.

== See also ==
- List of Billboard 200 number-one albums of 1996
- List of Billboard number-one R&B albums of 1996
