= Scenario (song) =

1992 single by A Tribe Called Quest

Single by A Tribe Called Quest featuring Leaders of the New School

from the album The Low End Theory
- B-side: "Butter"
- Released: March 13, 1992
- Recorded: 1991
- Genre: Boom bap; alternative hip-hop; golden age hip-hop
- Length: 4:10
- Label: Jive
- Songwriters: Kamaal Fareed; Bryan Higgins; James Jackson; Ali Shaheed Muhammad; Trevor Smith; Malik Taylor
- Producer: A Tribe Called Quest

A Tribe Called Quest singles chronology
"Jazz (We've Got)" (1991)	"Scenario" (1992)	"Hot Sex" (1992)

Leaders of the New School singles chronology
"The International Zone Coaster" (1992)	"Scenario" (1992)	"What's Next" (1993)

Audio sample
- Scenario: file; help

Music video
- "Scenario" on YouTube

"Scenario" is a song by American hip-hop group A Tribe Called Quest, released in March 1992 by Jive Records as the third single from their second album, The Low End Theory (1991). The song features the rap group Leaders of the New School. Matt Cibula of PopMatters called the track hip-hop's greatest posse cut. The song is commonly considered a breakout moment for Leaders of the New School member Busta Rhymes, who was 19 when this song was released. Time included the song on its list of its All-TIME 100 Songs in 2017.

The song opens with the chorus, followed by verses from Phife Dawg, Charlie Brown, Dinco D, and Q-Tip, who hands the mic off to Busta Rhymes.

The accompanying music video, directed by Jim Swaffield, plays on an interactive desktop, and features cameo appearances by Spike Lee, De La Soul, Kid Capri, Brand Nubian, Fab Five Freddy, and Redman.

A remixed version of "Scenario" appeared on the B-side of the 12" single, the cassette single, and the limited edition release of the group's fifth album, The Love Movement (1998). The remix also features Leaders of the New School and newcomer Kid Hood, who was murdered two days after recording his verse. Blender magazine ranked the "Scenario" remix at number 216 in its list of "The 500 Greatest Songs Since You Were Born".

== Samples ==
- "Oblighetto" by Brother Jack McDuff
- "Little Miss Lover" by Jimi Hendrix
- "Soul Vibrations" and "Funky Granny" by Kool & the Gang [sample appears on remix only]
- "Ecstasy" by Ohio Players [sample appears on the remix only]
- "Blind Alley" by The Emotions [sample appears on the remix only]

== Charts ==
Chart (1992)	Peak position
UK Dance (Music Week)	38
US Billboard Hot 100	57
US Dance Singles Sales (Billboard)	34
US Hot R&B/Hip-Hop Songs (Billboard)	42
US Hot Rap Songs (Billboard)	6

== Certifications ==
Region	Certification	Certified units/sales
United States (RIAA)	Gold	500,000^{‡}
^{‡} Sales+streaming figures based on certification alone.
