= Bonita Applebum =

Single by A Tribe Called Quest

from the album People's Instinctive Travels and the Paths of Rhythm
- B-side: "Mr. Muhammad"
- Released: July 5, 1990
- Recorded: 1989
- Genre: Alternative hip-hop; jazz rap; psychedelic rap
- Length: 3:50 (album version) 3:18 (radio edit)
- Label: Jive
- Songwriters: Kamaal Fareed; Ali Shaheed Muhammad; William Henry Allen; Roy Ayers; Edwin Birdsong; Walter Booker; Charles Stepney
- Producer: A Tribe Called Quest

A Tribe Called Quest singles chronology
"I Left My Wallet in El Segundo" (1990)	"Bonita Applebum" (1990)	"Can I Kick It?" (1990)

Audio sample
- Bonita Applebum: file; help

Music video
- "Bonita Applebum" on YouTube

"Bonita Applebum" is a song by American hip-hop group A Tribe Called Quest, released on July 5, 1990 by Jive Records as the second single from their debut album, People's Instinctive Travels and the Paths of Rhythm (1990). The song contains samples of "Daylight" by RAMP, "Memory Band" by Rotary Connection, "Jagger the Dagger" by Eugene McDaniels and "Fool Yourself" by Little Feat. The accompanying music video was directed by Charles Stone III. Rolling Stone featured "Bonita Applebum" on their list of 20 essential songs from the group in 2016.

== Background ==
The original version of "Bonita Applebum", made in 1985, was one of A Tribe Called Quest's first demos. A few years later, the song was remade and included on the People's Instinctive Travels album. Initially, Q-Tip used a conventional rap delivery for the song, but after reading a Miles Davis interview about "space" (rests), he decided to adopt the technique by changing the beat and using a conversational delivery.

== Music video ==
The music video for "Bonita Applebum", directed by Charles Stone III, opens with Q-Tip reciting the intro by asking Bonita questions, followed by little stick figure cartoon characters who see Bonita and chase after her. The group is seen walking and dancing. Q-Tip starts the first verse at a party. However, the group stops because a kid catches a baseball they were going to be hit with. The group stops again because they see a man playing a piano. Soon the kid who was playing baseball is seen dancing, and Q-Tip is behind a violet curtain trying to impress Bonita. The group is wearing helmets while cassette tapes are dropped on them, and the video ends with the group at the party with other people dancing.

== Remixes ==
A popular "Why remix" was made, which heavily sampled the song "Why" by Carly Simon. Another remix was made in 1993, with a new beat and new lyrics. There is also a third remix titled "Bonita Applebum (Hootie Mix)" that samples The Isley Brothers' "Between the Sheets" and also has new lyrics. It was briefly featured in the film Poetic Justice, which coincidentally stars Q-Tip. In 2015, Pharrell Williams remixed the song for the 25th anniversary reissue of the debut album.

== Samples ==
- B.o.B used the beat for his song "Put Me On".
- The song was sampled for the remix to Monica's 2003 hit single, "So Gone", which also features Busta Rhymes, Missy Elliott & Tweet.
- The 2008 Karina Pasian single "Can't Find the Words" includes the same drum sample (from "Fool Yourself") that "Bonita Applebum" does.
- The song is sampled in the Fugees cover of "Killing Me Softly with His Song".
- The beat and sitar riff are sampled in the remix of Wyclef Jean's song "Fast Car".
- The song is both sampled and interpolated in Pacific Division's song "Put Me On".
- The song was remixed and released as part of Old School vs. New School – 4 on the Floor (Jive Electro) in 2000 and features a new vocal hook performed by Simon Green and Yazmin James.
- The Nextmen sample the words "ain't no need to question the authority" in the song "Break the Mould".
- Danish rap group Hvid Sjokolade sampled "Bonita Applebum" on the track "Jeg vil ha' dig" from their 1996 album Så'n er vi.

== References in other songs ==
- Biz Markie references the title character in his single "Tear Shit Up".
- Jay-Z refers to the song in his single "I Know": "Bonita Applebum, I gotta put you on. If I didn't when we cuttin' the feeling would be too strong."
- P.M. Dawn reference the song in their hit "Set Adrift on Memory Bliss": "Christina Applegate, you gotta put me on."
- Pro Era artist Capital Steez makes a reference in his song "Apex".
- Joey Badass' group Pro Era finishes the song "Rosie at Rubber Tracks" with an interlude that references the single. The same song appears with the name "Sorry Bonita" on Summer Knights, the third solo mixtape from Badass.
- The Black Eyed Peas song "Rap Song" from their album Bridging the Gap references the song.
- Lil Wayne refers to it in the solo version of "I'm Going In", when he says "my style, is second to none, so you gotta put me on like bonita applebum."
- Redman refers to the song in his single "Mrs. International" where he says "I know your applebum like Bonita."
- Tabi Bonney refers to the song on the Curren$y collaboration "Radio" when he says "I got plenty girls but it ain't enough, so I ask Q-Tip, 'what's up with Bonita.'"
- Shad makes reference to this in his single "Keep Shining".
- Slum Village make a reference to the song in the chorus of "Turning Me Off" (featuring De La Soul): "Bonita Applebum you kinda turn me off."
- Mellowhype's song "La Bonita" references "Bonita Applebum".
- Masta Ace The song "Juanita Estefan" from the album The Falling Season pays homage to Bonita Applebum by using the same flow from the hook.
- Trife da God references Bonita in his verse on the Ghostface Killah song "Jellyfish" on the album Fishscale, with the line, "Ms. Bonita Applebum bottom, thick as a Roman column."

== Charts ==
=== Weekly charts ===
Chart (1990)	Peak position
Australia (ARIA)	144
UK Singles (Official Charts)	47
US Dance Singles Sales (Billboard)	28
US Hot R&B/Hip-Hop Songs (Billboard)	56
US Hot Rap Songs (Billboard)	4

=== Year-end charts ===
Chart (1990)	Position
UK Club Chart (Record Mirror)	72
