= Hits, Rarities & Remixes =

Compilation album by A Tribe Called Quest
- Released: June 17, 2003
- Genre: Alternative hip hop
- Label: Jive
- Producers: A Tribe Called Quest; The Ummah

A Tribe Called Quest chronology
The Anthology (1999)	Hits, Rarities & Remixes (2003)	The Lost Tribes (2006)

Professional ratings
Review scores
Source	Rating
Allmusic	4/5 stars
The Encyclopedia of Popular Music	3/5 stars
Q	4/5 stars
RapReviews	(7/10)
Rolling Stone	4/5 stars
RTÉ.ie	4/5 stars
Uncut	3/5 stars
HipHopDX	4/5 stars
Muzik	3/5 stars

Hits, Rarities & Remixes is a compilation album by A Tribe Called Quest. It features two previously unreleased songs ("Mr. Incognito" and "The Night He Got Caught") as well as remixes and some of the group's more familiar songs. It also contains songs that were featured in movie soundtracks.

== Track listing ==
1. "Oh My God [Remix]"
2. "Award Tour" (featuring Trugoy)
3. "Can I Kick It?"
4. "One Two Shit" (featuring Busta Rhymes)
5. "Electric Relaxation"
6. "Mr. Incognito"
7. "I Left My Wallet in El Segundo"
8. "Check the Rhime"
9. "Lyrics to Go [Tumblin' Dice Remix]"
10. "Scenario" (featuring Leaders of the New School)
11. "Same Ol' Thing" (from Men in Black: The Album)
12. "Buggin' Out"
13. "Bonita Applebum"
14. "Jazz (We've Got)"
15. "Glamour & Glitz" (from The Show [soundtrack])
16. "Clap Your Hands"
17. "The Night He Got Caught"
18. "Peace, Prosperity & Paper" (from High School High [soundtrack])

== Charts ==
Chart (2003)	Peak position
US Billboard 200	190
US Top R&B/Hip-Hop Albums (Billboard)	51
