= Hot Sex =

Single by A Tribe Called Quest

from the album Boomerang soundtrack
- Released: 1992
- Genre: Alternative hip-hop
- Length: 2:45
- Label: Jive
- Songwriters: Kamaal Fareed; Ali Shaheed Muhammad; Malik Taylor
- Producer: A Tribe Called Quest

A Tribe Called Quest singles chronology
"Scenario" (1992)	"Hot Sex" (1992)	"Award Tour" (1993)

Music video
- "Hot Sex" on YouTube

"Hot Sex" is a single by hip-hop group A Tribe Called Quest. It was released in 1992 on the soundtrack for the film Boomerang and was later featured on European editions of the group's third studio album Midnight Marauders one year later in 1993. The track was also featured as a bonus track on the group's fifth album The Love Movement in 1998, and on the 1999 compilation album The Anthology.

The production of "Hot Sex" was sampled for Heltah Skeltah's 1998 hit single "I Ain't Havin' That" and Mary J. Blige's 2003 single, "Love @ 1st Sight".

== Music video ==
The music video features Phife Dawg and Q-Tip (who, notably, wears a ski mask due to an eye injury he suffered during a confrontation) rapping inside an abandoned movie theater, while Ali Shaheed Muhammad sings the chorus from the stage. Scenes from Boomerang are shown on the theater projection.

== Charts ==
Chart (1992)	Peak position
US Dance Singles Sales (Billboard)	27
US Hot R&B/Hip-Hop Songs (Billboard)	99
