= Check the Rhime =

Single by A Tribe Called Quest

from the album The Low End Theory
- B-side: "Skypager"
- Released: September 9, 1991
- Genre: Alternative hip-hop
- Length: 3:36
- Label: Jive
- Songwriters: Roger Ball; Malcolm Duncan; Kamaal Fareed; Steve Ferrone; Alan Gorrie; Ali Shaheed Muhammad; Onnie McIntyre; Minnie Riperton; Richard Rudolph; Hamish Stuart; Malik Taylor; Leon Ware
- Producer: A Tribe Called Quest

A Tribe Called Quest singles chronology
"Can I Kick It?" (1990)	"Check the Rhime" (1991)	"Jazz (We've Got)" (1991)

Music video
- "Check the Rhime" on YouTube

"Check the Rhime" is a song by American hip-hop group A Tribe Called Quest, released in September 1991 by Jive Records as the first single from their second album, The Low End Theory (1991). The song was written by group members Phife Dawg, Q-Tip, and Ali Shaheed Muhammad. It was recorded at the legendary Greene St. Recording studio in New York City. The song peaked at number 59 on the US Billboard Hot 100 on November 16, 1991. Rolling Stone listed "Check the Rhime" as one of the group's 20 essential songs, noting that Phife Dawg "quickly proves himself Q-Tip's lyrical equal."

== Composition ==
The song samples "Love Your Life" by Average White Band; this is why the band members are credited.

== Music video ==
The music video for "Check the Rhime", directed by American director Jim Swaffield, starts out in front of houses and moves to a dry cleaning business in St. Albans, Queens, New York City, where the group performs on the roof in front of a large crowd. The dry cleaners shop featured in the video is still at the corner of 192nd St. & Linden Blvd. in St. Albans. In 2016, a mural was commissioned on the wall of the business after the death of the group's founding member, Phife Dawg.

== Charts ==
Chart (1991)	Peak position
UK Dance (Music Week)	22
US Dance Singles Sales (Billboard)	28
US Hot R&B/Hip-Hop Songs (Billboard)	59
US Hot Rap Songs (Billboard)	1

== Certifications ==
Region	Certification	Certified units/sales
United States (RIAA)	Gold	500,000^{‡}
^{‡} Sales+streaming figures based on certification alone.
