= Stressed Out (A Tribe Called Quest song) =

Single by A Tribe Called Quest featuring Faith Evans

from the album Beats, Rhymes and Life
- B-side: "1nce Again"
- Released: November 11, 1996
- Genre: East Coast hip-hop
- Length: 4:58
- Label: Jive
- Songwriters: Kamaal Fareed, Ali Shaheed Muhammad; Dexter Mills; Malik Taylor; Faith Evans; James Yancey; Gary Taylor
- Producer: The Ummah

A Tribe Called Quest singles chronology
"1nce Again" (1996)	"Stressed Out" (1996)	"Rumble in the Jungle" (1997)

Faith Evans singles chronology
"You Could Be My Boo" (1996)	"Stressed Out" (1996)	"I'll Be Missing You" (1997)

Music video
- "Stressed Out" on YouTube

"Stressed Out" is the second single from A Tribe Called Quest's fourth album Beats, Rhymes and Life. The song was produced by The Ummah and features Faith Evans on the chorus. The song’s chorus contains an interpolation of “Good Love” by Anita Baker.

== Music video ==
The music video begins with A Tribe Called Quest in a red room. The next scene features a dice game that includes Consequence and Q-Tip. During the game two men begin to fight and as a car pulls up everyone flees. During the chorus, Faith Evans is in blue, red, and black rooms. A restaurant dishwasher is pictured, stressed out at work. A man with money problems is also shown struggling to pay his bills and provide for his family. Then, the dishwasher knocks down all of the dishes and leaves work. When Faith Evans sings, "we gon' make it", the man with money problems and his family are seen throwing a birthday party.

== Appearances ==
The group performed the song on the sitcom Moesha, in the episode titled "A Concerted Effort: Part 1", which aired on November 5, 1996.

== Track listing ==
U.S. 12-inch maxi-single – Jive 01241-42420-1

1. "Stressed Out" (Baby Phife Version) – 4:47
2. "Stressed Out" (Raphael Saadiq's Remix) – 5:20
3. "Stressed Out" (LP version) – 4:56
4. "1nce Again" (LP version) – 3:50
5. "1nce Again" (Jay Dee's Instrumental) – 3:50
6. "Stressed Out" (Baby Phife Instrumental) – 4:47

U.S. CD maxi-single – Jive 01241-42420-2

1. "Stressed Out" (Baby Phife Version) – 4:47
2. "Stressed Out" (Raphael Saadiq's Remix) – 5:20
3. "Stressed Out" (Björk's Married to the Mob Mix) – 1:49
4. "Stressed Out" (Björk's Dandelions Mix) – 4:24
5. "Stressed Out" (Björk's Say Dip Mix) – 4:19

U.K. 12-inch maxi-single – Jive JIVE T 404

1. "Stressed Out" (Raphael Saadiq's Remix – Radio) – 4:34
2. "Stressed Out" (LP version) – 4:56
3. "Stressed Out" (Raphael Saadiq's Remix – Instrumental) – 5:09
4. "Stressed Out" (Baby Phife Version - Radio) – 4:03
5. "Stressed Out" (LP version Instrumental) – 4:20
6. "Stressed Out" (Baby Phife Accapella) – 4:48

U.K. CD maxi-single – Jive JIVE CD 404

1. "Stressed Out" (Raphael Saadiq's Remix – Radio) – 4:34
2. "Stressed Out" (Baby Phife Version - Radio) – 4:03
3. "Stressed Out" (LP version) – 4:56
4. "Stressed Out" (Raphael Saadiq's Remix – Instrumental) – 5:09

== Charts ==
Chart (1996)	Peak position
Australia (ARIA)	143
Scotland Singles (OCC)	81
UK Dance (OCC)	3
UK Hip Hop/R&B (OCC)	2
UK Singles (OCC)	33
US Bubbling Under Hot 100 (Billboard)	8
US Dance Singles Sales (Billboard) Double A-side with "1nce Again"	3
US Hot R&B/Hip-Hop Songs (Billboard)	56
US Hot Rap Songs (Billboard)	15
