= People's Instinctive Travels and the Paths of Rhythm =

1990 studio album by A Tribe Called Quest

Studio album by A Tribe Called Quest
- Released: April 17, 1990
- Studios: Calliope Studios, Battery Studios (New York City)
- Genres: East Coast hip-hop; alternative hip-hop; progressive rap; jazz rap
- Length: 64:15
- Label: Jive
- Producer: A Tribe Called Quest

A Tribe Called Quest chronology
People's Instinctive Travels and the Paths of Rhythm (1990)	The Low End Theory (1991)

Singles from People's Instinctive Travels and the Paths of Rhythm
- 1. "I Left My Wallet in El Segundo" Released: April 11, 1990; 2. "Bonita Applebum" Released: July 5, 1990; 3. "Can I Kick It?" Released: October 29, 1990

People's Instinctive Travels and the Paths of Rhythm is the debut studio album by American hip-hop group A Tribe Called Quest, released on April 17, 1990, by Jive Records. After forming the Native Tongues collective and collaborating on several projects, A Tribe Called Quest began recording sessions for People's Instinctive Travels in late 1989 at Calliope Studios with completion reached in early 1990. The album's laid back production encompassed a diverse range of samples that functioned as a template for the group's unorthodox lyrics.

People's Instinctive Travels and the Paths of Rhythm was met with acclaim from professional music critics and the hip hop community on release, and was eventually certified Gold in the United States on January 19, 1996. Its recognition has extended over the years as it is widely regarded as one of the greatest albums of the 1990s and a central album in alternative hip-hop with its unconventional production and lyricism. It is also credited for influencing many artists in both hip-hop and R&B. In a commemorative article for XXL, Michael Blair wrote that the album "was immensely groundbreaking, and will eternally maintain its relevance within the culture and construction of hip-hop".

== Background ==
A Tribe Called Quest formed in Queens, New York, in 1985. After establishing a friendship with hip-hop act Jungle Brothers, both groups formed a collective dubbed Native Tongues, which also included De La Soul.

Several years prior to recording People's Instinctive Travels and the Paths of Rhythm, group member Q-Tip created much of the album's production on pause tapes when he was in the 10th grade. He would have his first studio experience while recording with Jungle Brothers on their debut album Straight out the Jungle (1988). Although this was a learning experience, he acquired more recording and producing knowledge being present at all of De La Soul's 3 Feet High and Rising (1989) sessions. Recording engineer Shane Faber taught Q-Tip how to use equipment such as the E-mu SP-1200 and Akai S950 samplers, and soon-after, renowned producer Large Professor taught him how to use other equipment, for which he would expand upon on People's Instinctive Travels.

Initially, record labels would not sign A Tribe Called Quest due to their unconventional image and sound, but took interest after the success of 3 Feet High and Rising, which featured appearances from Q-Tip. The group hired Kool DJ Red Alert as their manager, and after shopping their demo to several major labels, they signed a contract with Jive Records in 1989.

== Recording ==
Recording for the album began in late 1989, and finished three months later in early 1990, with "Pubic Enemy" and "Bonita Applebum" as the first tracks recorded.

The group chose Calliope Studios as their primary studio, as it was known for allowing artistic freedom. Jungle Brothers, Queen Latifah and Prince Paul with De La Soul and Stetsasonic, were all recording new music in separate rooms while A Tribe Called Quest recorded People's Instinctive Travels. Q-Tip later commented, "It was exciting. We were kinda left to our own devices. It was just a great environment, conductive for creating. We didn't have cell phones, we didn't have the internet, we didn't have a bunch of things to tear at us. When we got to the studio, the specific job was to make music. There was no TV in there. It was all instruments and speakers. It was just music."

Q-Tip and Ali Shaheed Muhammad would listen to records several seconds at a time, and re-work them in relationship with other records that would fit. Ali played all live instruments, DJ scratches and programming, while Q-Tip handled everything else with production, including sampling and mixing.

Although claiming that "we all helped put the album together", Q-Tip was the only group member present at every recording session. Group member Phife Dawg later admitted, "I was being ignorant on that first album, that's why I was only on a couple of tracks. I was hardly around. I would have rather hung out with my boys on the street and got my hustle on rather than gone in the studio. I wasn't even on the contract for the first album. I was thinking me and Jarobi were more like back-ups for Tip and Ali, but Tip and Ali really wanted me to come through and do my thing".

== Music and lyrics ==
People's Instinctive Travels and the Paths of Rhythm has been described as "a celebration of bohemia, psychedelia and vagabondia", as well as "laid back". Los Angeles Times critic Dennis Hunt described the album as consisting of "mostly happy hip-hop, featuring gently humorous, casual, conversational raps". Michael Blair from XXL wrote that "the innovative production on this album created an optimal platform for the group's wildly inventive relationship with their words. From a lyrical standpoint, Tribe was both sophisticated and playful in the same breath".

Much of the musical landscape on the album consisted of background noises such as a child crying, frogs and Hawaiian strings. The jazz, R&B and rock samples that were used were from artists that most hip-hop producers of the time ignored, or who were unfamiliar with. For the known artists that were sampled, Q-Tip used breaks that were unique for those artists, which turned out to be highly influential for hip-hop production. Ian McCann from NME stated "They break beats from anywhere they want ... and deliver them in an easy, totally sympathetic setting." Entertainment Weekly's Greg Sandow said the album "has a casual sound, something like laid-back jazz".

Regarding the album's lyrics, Kris Ex from Pitchfork said "The rhymes here are at once conversational and repressed, the topics concurrently large and small. The lyrics are 25 years old. But were they released today they'd seem right on time."

== Critical reception ==
Professional ratings
Review scores
Source	Rating
AllMusic	4.5/5 stars
Chicago Tribune	3.5/4 stars
Entertainment Weekly	A−
NME	9/10
Pitchfork	10/10
Rolling Stone	3/5 stars
The Rolling Stone Album Guide	4/5 stars
The Source	5/5 stars
Spin	4/5 stars
The Village Voice	B+

People's Instinctive Travels and the Paths of Rhythm was met with widespread acclaim from critics. Reviewing the album for NME, Ian McCann wrote that "A Tribe Called Quest put no feet in the wrong place here. This is not rap, it's near perfection". In Entertainment Weekly, Greg Sandow commented that on the album, rather than "defining Afrocentric living", the group "more or less exemplifies it with no fuss at all". Robert Tanzilo from the Chicago Tribune stated that the album "avoids the gimmickry and circus atmosphere" of the group's contemporaries, while "focusing solely on the music". The Source gave it the first "five-mic" rating in the magazine's history, describing it as a "completely musical and spiritual approach to hip-hop", as well as "a voyage to the land of positive vibrations, and each cut is a new experience".

Writing for the Los Angeles Times, Dennis Hunt called the album "fascinating" and wrote "These songs lope along in a quirkly, jazz-like pace. They're intriguingly non-linear and quite provocative, even though their meaning is somewhat elusive". The Village Voice's Robert Christgau said that the album, while "subtler than ... necessary" at points, is "indubitably progressive" and "has more good songs on it than any neutral observer will believe without trying". Chuck Eddy from Rolling Stone was more critical, finding that "the real pleasure on People's Instinctive Travels and the Paths of Rhythm comes from a detailed mesh of instruments and incidental sounds", and that "the rappers of A Tribe Called Quest tend to mumble in understated monotones that feel self-satisfied, even bored".

=== Retrospect ===
John Bush of AllMusic said "Restless and ceaselessly imaginative, Tribe perhaps experimented too much on their debut, but they succeeded at much of it, certainly enough to show much promise as a new decade dawned". Thomas Golianopoulos of Spin wrote that "following in the ground-breaking footsteps of their Native Tongues brethren, Tribe's laid-back debut had no heavy handed political or battle raps, just youthful exuberance and playfully goofy lyrics". Praising its production and lyricism, Kris Ex, writing for Pitchfork, credited the album for showcasing the group as "whimsical yet grounded in reality" with its "clean and focused" quality. He went on to write that "all these many years later People's Instinctive Travels and the Paths of Rhythm is more than a nostalgia artifact. It's a worthy listen, not because of what it was, but because of what it is". Dave Heaton of PopMatters called the album "brilliant" and said it was "an introduction to Q-Tip's talent." In his 5th edition of Encyclopedia of Popular Music, Colin Larkin rated the album three stars and called it "eclectic and self-consciously jokey".

=== Accolades ===
Since its release, People's Instinctive Travels and the Paths of Rhythm has been included on numerous "best of" lists compiled by music writers and journalists.

Publication	Country	Accolade	Year	Rank
Best	France	The Best Albums of the Year	1990	4
Robert Dimery	United States	1001 Albums You Must Hear Before You Die	2005	*
Ego Trip	United States	Hip Hop's 25 Greatest Albums by Year: 1979–1998	1999	9
Entertainment Weekly	United States	The 100 Best Albums from 1983 to 2008	2008	18
The Face	United Kingdom	Best Albums of the Year	1990	3
Les Inrockuptibles	France	50 Years of Rock'n'Roll	2004	*
Les Inrockuptibles	France	The 100 Best Albums 1986–1996	1996	60
Mixmag	United Kingdom	The 100 Best Dance Albums of All Time	1996	36
Mucchio Selvaggio	Italy	100 Best Albums by Decade	2002	21–50
news.com.au	Australia	100 Must Have Albums	2013	*
NME	United Kingdom	Best Albums of the Year	1990	7
NME	United Kingdom	The 500 Greatest Albums of All Time	2013	420
Pop	Sweden	The World's 100 Best Albums + 300 Complements	1994	101
Record Collector	United Kingdom	10 Classic Albums from 21 Genres for the 21st Century	2000	*
Rock & Folk	France	The 250 Best Albums from 1966 to 1991	1991	*
Rockdelux	Spain	The Best Albums of the Year	1991	23
Select	United Kingdom	The Best Albums of the Year	1990	6
Sounds	United Kingdom	The Best Albums of the Year	1990	37
The Source	United States	100 Best Rap Albums of All Time	1998	*
Spex	Germany	The Best Albums of the Year	1990	3
Technikart	France	50 Albums from the Last 10 Years	1997	*
Gilles Verlant	France	300+ Best Albums in the History of Rock	2013	*
The Village Voice	United States	Best Albums of the Year	1990	18
XXL	United States	40 Years of Hip-Hop: Top 5 Albums by Year	2014	*
Zündfunk	Germany	The Best Albums of the 90s	2000	24
(*) designates lists that are unordered.

== Legacy ==
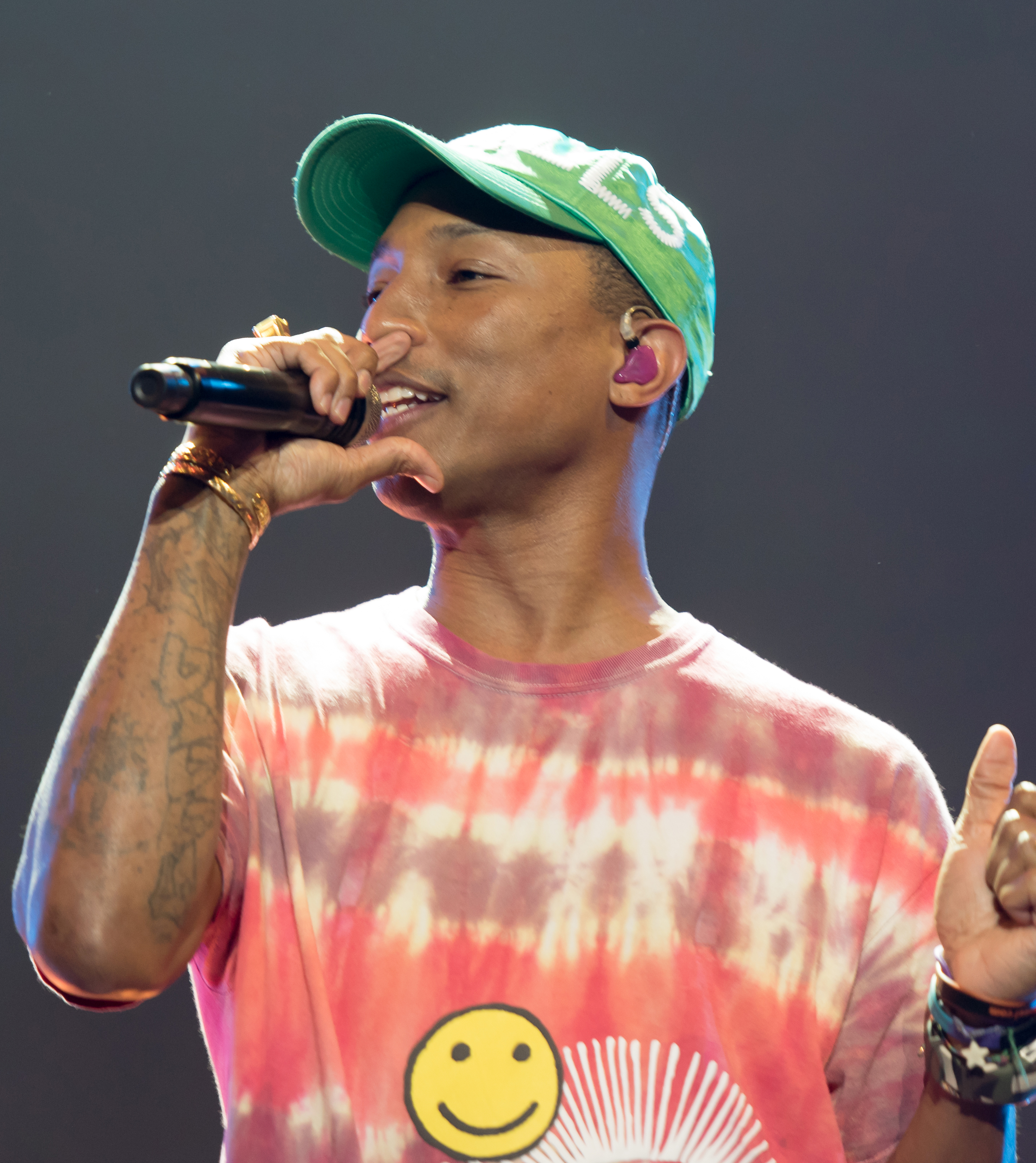
On several occasions acclaimed producer and vocalist Pharrell Williams has spoken on the album's influence.

People's Instinctive Travels and the Paths of Rhythm has been recognized for widening hip-hop's vocabulary, as well as instrumentation and samples within hip-hop music. It has also been recognized for influencing a wide range of acclaimed hip-hop and R&B artists, including Common, D'Angelo, Digable Planets, Erykah Badu, Fugees, J Dilla, Kendrick Lamar, Mos Def, Outkast, Scarface, and Kanye West. Pharrell Williams stated "I listened to 'Bonita' everyday. I'd never heard anything like that in my life. That's where I changed". On another occasion, Williams explained that People's Instinctive Travels "caused a turning point in my life, which made me see that music was art."

Reviewing the album for AllMusic, John Bush called People's Instinctive Travels and the Paths of Rhythm "the quiet beginning of a revolution in non-commercial hip-hop." For Pitchfork, Kris Ex stated that with the album the group "created and refined a template for '90s hip-hop that was street-astute, worldly, and more inspirational than aspirational". In a commemorative article for XXL, Michael Blair wrote "What A Tribe Called Quest ultimately became the pioneers of, and was on full display throughout the production on their debut album, was a certain proficiency in illustrating and honoring a diverse array of genres that preceded them. In what is mostly attributed to Q-Tip's deep appreciation and understanding of those definitive genres, Tribe's sound was perpetually laced with elements of Jazz, Soul, R&B, and Funk". Blair concluded that "People's Instinctive Travels and the Paths of Rhythm was immensely groundbreaking, and will eternally maintain its relevance within the culture and construction of hip-hop."

Hip-hop journalist Harry Allen described the album as a turning point in hip-hop where artists did not have to be "tough". A Tribe Called Quest member Ali Shaheed Muhammad further elaborated that "LL Cool J, Big Daddy Kane, KRS-One, N.W.A, even Public Enemy, had a tough guy image. It was this bravado at the time that all the hip-hop artists had. People's Instinctive Travels wasn't any of that. We weren't trying to be tough guys. It was about having fun, being lighthearted, being witty, being poetic. Just being good with one another. That's what we presented. Just be. Just exist. Be comfortable in your own skin. People's Instinctive Travels was about celebrating you, whoever you are".

== Track listing ==
All tracks written and produced by A Tribe Called Quest. Credits from album liner notes.

No.	Title	Length
1.	"Push It Along"	7:42
2.	"Luck of Lucien"	4:32
3.	"After Hours"	4:39
4.	"Footprints"	4:00
5.	"I Left My Wallet in El Segundo"	4:06
6.	"Pubic Enemy"	3:45
7.	"Bonita Applebum"	3:50
8.	"Can I Kick It?"	4:11
9.	"Youthful Expression"	4:52
10.	"Rhythm (Devoted to the Art of Moving Butts)"	4:01
11.	"Mr. Muhammad"	3:33
12.	"Ham 'n' Eggs"	5:27
13.	"Go Ahead in the Rain"	3:54
14.	"Description of a Fool"	5:41
Total length:		64:15

25th Anniversary bonus tracks
No.	Title	Length
15.	"Footprints (CeeLo Green Remix)" (featuring CeeLo Green)	5:08
16.	"Bonita Applebum (Pharrell Williams Remix)"	3:53
17.	"Can I Kick It? (J. Cole Remix)"	2:49

Partial sample credits

- "Push It Along" contains a sample from "Loran's Dance", as performed by Grover Washington Jr.
- "Luck of Lucien" contains a sample from "All You Need Is Love", as performed by The Beatles, and "Forty Days", as performed by Billy Brooks.
- "Footprints" contains samples from "Sir Duke", as performed by Stevie Wonder and "Think Twice", as performed by Donald Byrd.
- "I Left My Wallet in El Segundo" contains a sample from "Let's Get Funky", as performed by The Chambers Brothers.
- "Bonita Applebum" contains samples from "Daylight", as performed by RAMP, "Memory Band", as performed by Rotary Connection and "Soul Virgo", as performed by Cannonball Adderley.
- "Can I Kick It?" contains samples from "Spinning Wheel", as performed by Lonnie Smith and "Walk on the Wild Side", as performed by Lou Reed.
- "Mr. Muhammad" contains a sample from "Brazilian Rhyme (Beijo)", as performed by Earth, Wind & Fire.
- "Ham 'n' Eggs" contains a sample from "Nappy Dugout", as performed by Funkadelic.
- "Go Ahead in the Rain" contains a sample from "Slide", as performed by Slave.
- "Description of a Fool" contains a sample from "Running Away", as performed by Roy Ayers.
- "Rhythm (Devoted to the Art of Moving Butts) contains a sample from "Get Off Your Ass and Jam", as performed by Funkadelic.

== Personnel ==
- Q-Tip – performer, production, mixing
- Ali Shaheed Muhammad – scratching, programming
- Phife Dawg – performer
- Jarobi White – performer
- Lucien – background vocals
- Bob Power – engineer
- Shane Faber – engineer
- Tim Latham – engineer
- Bob Coulter – engineer
- Anthony Saunders – engineer
- Kool DJ Red Alert – management, executive producer
- Paije Hunyady – cover art
- Bryant Peters – cover art
- Ari Marcopoulos – photography
- Justin Herz – photography

== Charts ==
=== Weekly charts ===
Chart (1990)	Peak position
Australian Albums (ARIA)	184
UK Albums (Official Charts)	54
US Billboard 200	91
US Top R&B/Hip-Hop Albums (Billboard)	23
Chart (2015)	Peak position
UK R&B Albums (Official Charts)	37

=== Year-end charts ===
Chart (1990)	Position
US Top R&B/Hip-Hop Albums (Billboard)	65

== Certifications ==
Region	Certification	Certified units/sales
United Kingdom (BPI)	Silver	60,000^{‡}
United States (RIAA)	Gold	500,000^{^}
^{^} Shipments figures based on certification alone.^{‡} Sales+streaming figures based on certification alone.
