= The Low End Theory =

1991 studio album by A Tribe Called Quest

Studio album by A Tribe Called Quest
- Released: September 24, 1991
- Recorded: 1990–91
- Studios: Battery, Greene St. and Soundtrack (New York)
- Genres: East Coast hip-hop; alternative hip-hop; boom bap; jazz rap
- Length: 48:03
- Label: Jive
- Producers: A Tribe Called Quest; Skeff Anselm

A Tribe Called Quest chronology
People's Instinctive Travels and the Paths of Rhythm (1990)	The Low End Theory (1991)	Midnight Marauders (1993)

Singles from The Low End Theory
- 1. "Check the Rhime" Released: September 9, 1991; 2. "Jazz (We've Got)" Released: November 27, 1991; 3. "Scenario" Released: March 13, 1992

The Low End Theory is the second studio album by American hip-hop group A Tribe Called Quest, released on September 24, 1991, by Jive Records. Recording sessions for the album were held mostly at Battery Studios in New York City, from 1990 to 1991. The album was primarily produced by group member Q-Tip, with a minimalist sound that combines bass, drum breaks, and jazz samples, in a departure from the group's debut album, People's Instinctive Travels and the Paths of Rhythm (1990). Lyrically, the album features social commentary, word play, humor, and interplay between Q-Tip and fellow member Phife Dawg.

Supported by the lead single "Check the Rhime", The Low End Theory debuted at number 45 on the Billboard 200 chart. Upon its release, the album's commercial potential was doubted by music critics and Jive record executives. However, the release of two additional singles, "Jazz (We've Got)" and "Scenario", brought further attention and popularity to the group. On February 19, 1992, the album was certified gold by the Recording Industry Association of America (RIAA), with shipments of 500,000 copies in the United States, and on February 1, 1995, it was certified platinum by the RIAA, with shipments of one million copies.

In the years since its release, The Low End Theory has garnered recognition from music critics and writers as a milestone in alternative hip-hop. The album is regarded as Phife Dawg's breakout and is credited for helping launch rapper Busta Rhymes's successful solo career. The album's influence on artists in hip-hop, R&B and other genres has been attributed to the group's lyricism and Q-Tip's production, which bridged the gap between jazz and hip-hop. The album is widely regarded as one of the greatest albums of all time, appearing on many best album lists by music critics and writers. In 2020, it was ranked at number 43 on Rolling Stone's list of the 500 Greatest Albums of All Time. In 2022, the album was selected by the Library of Congress for preservation in the National Recording Registry for being "culturally, historically, or aesthetically significant".

== Background ==
A month after the release of A Tribe Called Quest's debut album, People's Instinctive Travels and the Paths of Rhythm (1990), group member Phife Dawg learned that he was diabetic and considered leaving the group. After a discussion with fellow member Q-Tip, they agreed to increase his participation on their second album and to "step it up in general as a group." Recording sessions for the second album began when sessions from People's Instinctive Travels kept creatively flowing. The group wanted to begin recording the album shortly after the completion of People's Instinctive Travels, for which they still had to tour and film music videos. Phife Dawg later recalled, "Tip didn't want to stop." The album's title, The Low End Theory, referred to both the status of black men in society and bass frequencies in the music, while its cover artwork featured an altered photograph of a kneeling woman painted in Afrocentric colors.

During the recording sessions, the group fired their manager Kool DJ Red Alert and joined Russell Simmons's Rush Artist Management, with Chris Lighty serving as their new manager. They also fired their lawyer, who was Red Alert's manager, and faced a lawsuit as a result. Both moves created tension within the Native Tongues collective, which was never fully resolved. After switching managers, the group demanded more advances from Jive, who eventually extended their recording contract for one more album. However, the negotiations between the group and Jive lasted over a year and strained their relationship. These events created a disillusionment with the music industry among the group, which affected "both material and approach" on The Low End Theory.

== Recording ==
The majority of the recording sessions took place at Battery Studios in Manhattan, from 1990 to 1991, where the songs were recorded on a Neve 8068 mixing console that had been used by John Lennon. Like People's Instinctive Travels, production on The Low End Theory was primarily handled by Q-Tip, while Ali Shaheed Muhammad provided DJ scratching and co-production. Skeff Anselm produced two songs, which were programmed at Jazzy Jay's Studio in The Bronx. Producer Pete Rock created the original beat for the second single, "Jazz (We've Got)", before it was recreated by Q-Tip, who credited Rock in the outro of the song.

Group member Jarobi White, who previously appeared on People's Instinctive Travels, had verses recorded for The Low End Theory. However, he left the group during the sessions to study culinary art and his verses did not make the final cut. The song "Butter" was originally supposed to feature a verse by Q-Tip, but Phife Dawg insisted on rapping solo on it, causing a brief argument. It essentially became a Phife Dawg solo record, with Q-Tip performing the chorus.

Two posse cuts were recorded: the third single "Scenario", featuring Leaders of the New School, and "Show Business", featuring Lord Jamar and Sadat X of Brand Nubian and Diamond D of D.I.T.C. The former had several versions recorded, one of which included Posdnous of De La Soul, as well as Chris Lighty, Jarobi White and future Flipmode Squad rapper Rampage, while the latter was originally recorded as "Georgie Porgie", but was rejected by Jive for being "too homophobic" before being rewritten. In addition, Q-Tip had a cold during the recording process and did not want to sound congested on the album; because of this he wanted to re-record all of his vocals and began doing so before people told him he sounded "fine" and convinced him otherwise.

== Music ==
=== Production ===
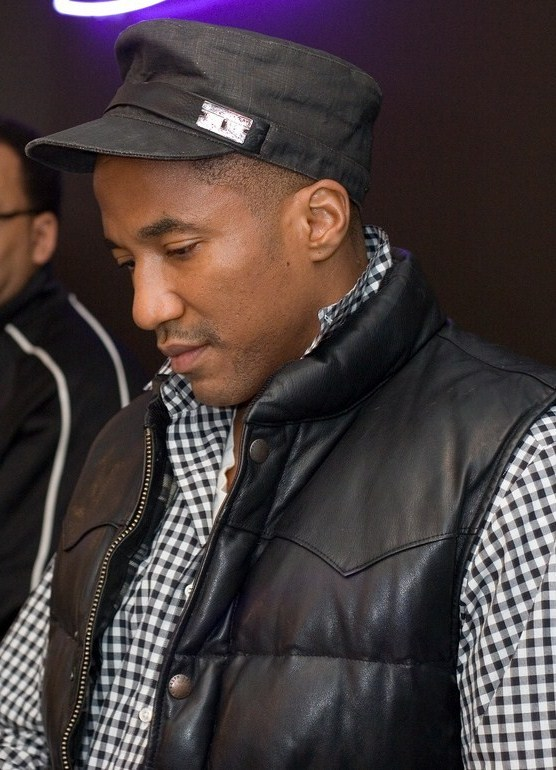
Q-Tip, the main architect behind the album's sound, layered drum sounds to create a single sound, also emphasizing the downbeat on each song.

A boom bap album, it is one of the first hip-hop albums fused with the laid-back atmosphere of jazz, particularly bebop and hard bop, the album's minimalist sound is "stripped to the essentials: vocals, drums, and bass." The bass drum and vocals emphasize the downbeat on every song. Q-Tip credited the production on N.W.A's album Straight Outta Compton as inspiration: "what resonated was just that bottom, that bass and the drive of it."

The album is noted for its use of the double bass, "crisp" and "live-sounding" drum programming, and "deftly placed samples or electric keyboards." In addition, the group was praised for its "departure towards a live instrumental sound" and for using "jazz-infused samples with fat hardcore beats." Q-Tip often layered drum sounds on the album, using as many as three snare drums or bass drums to create a single sound. Similarly, "Buggin' Out" was the first song in which he layered two different drum breaks at once, which was uncommon at the time. The group hired double bassist Ron Carter for the song "Verses from the Abstract". Q-Tip stated, "We wanted that straight bass sound, and Ron Carter is one of the premier bassists of the century."

The Low End Theory is also regarded for its engineering. The mixing engineer, Bob Power, used several methods to remove "surface noise, crackles, or pops" from the samples, as the software at the time was unable to do so. He credited the group, explaining that before The Low End Theory, most sampled records relied on a single repeating loop. In contrast, Q-Tip and Ali Shaheed Muhammad pioneered a new approach by creating intricate musical compositions built from samples drawn from various sources—combinations that traditional musicians often could not have reproduced live.

=== Lyrics ===
The Low End Theory is regarded for its socially conscious lyrics, which include subjects such as relationships, date rape, the hip-hop industry and consumerism. Other lyrics are devoted to word play, humor and "showing off." The album introduced the lyrical interplay and chemistry between Q-Tip and Phife Dawg, the latter of whom experienced a lyrical breakout. While acknowledging that Q-Tip had "already proven he is a highly skilled lyricist", Reef of The Source also stated, "Those who questioned Phife's microphone techniques on the first album will swallow those doubts as he practically steals the show on this one." The album is also noted for its minimal use of explicit lyrics, as Ron Carter only agreed to record songs on the condition that the group avoid profanity, to which Q-Tip assured they were addressing "real issues."

The duo's lyrical delivery, flow, and styles contrasted each other; Q-Tip had a mellow voice and was philosophical, reflective, contemplative and esoteric, while Phife Dawg had a high-pitched voice and was comical, battle rhyme-ready, streetwise and self-deprecating. John Bush of AllMusic said the pair's rapping "could be the smoothest of any rap record ever heard", adding that they "are so in tune with each other, they sound like flip sides of the same personality, fluidly trading off on rhymes, with the former earning his nickname (the Abstract) and Phife concerning himself with the more concrete issues of being young, gifted, and black."

== Commercial performance ==
The Low End Theory peaked at number 45 on the Billboard 200 and number 13 on the Top R&B/Hip-Hop Albums chart. Upon its release, the album's commercial potential was doubted by music critics and Jive record executives, including label CEO Barry Weiss. However, on February 19, 1992, the album was certified gold by the Recording Industry Association of America (RIAA), with shipments of 500,000 copies in the United States. On February 1, 1995, it was certified platinum by the RIAA, with shipments of one million copies.

== Critical reception ==
1991 professional reviews
Review scores
Source	Rating
Entertainment Weekly	B
NME	8/10
Orlando Sentinel	2/3 stars
The Philadelphia Inquirer	3.5/4 stars
Select	4/5
The Source	5/5 stars

Upon its release, The Low End Theory received widespread critical acclaim. It was awarded a perfect five mic rating in The Source, with reviewer Reef lauding their "progressive sound" and "streetwise edge", adding that "there's no sophomore jinx to be found here—only real hip-hop." Iestyn George of NME praised the album as a "quantum leap" from People's Instinctive Travels, noting, "Gone are the quirky samples that gave them their lighter edge, replaced by stark, hard-hitting beats." George also credited Q-Tip and Phife Dawg for "trading lines like psychic sparring partners", as they "pause, interject, charm and challenge with understated aplomb."

James Bernard of Entertainment Weekly commended the group for its jazzy sound, which "perfectly complements their laid-back, raspy delivery", but was critical of the album's lack of danceable songs, calling it "the greatest hip-hop album that will never quicken my pulse." The Village Voice critic Robert Christgau was reserved in his praise, believing the group delivered "goofball rhymes" from a "well-meaning middle class" perspective, later writing that "like so many 'beats,' Low End Theory's Ron Carter bass was really a glorified sound effect—what excited its admirers wasn't its thrust, or even the thrill of the sound itself, so much as the classiness it signified." He named "Check the Rhime" and "Buggin' Out" as highlights, while giving the album a three-star honorable mention, indicating "an enjoyable effort consumers attuned to its overriding aesthetic or individual vision may well treasure."

=== Retrospect ===
In the years since its release, The Low End Theory has received further widespread acclaim from music critics and writers, many of whom regard it as one of the greatest hip-hop albums of all time. In The New Rolling Stone Album Guide, writer Mac Randall lauded it as a "hip-hop masterpiece." AllMusic writer John Bush, who declared it "the most consistent and flowing hip-hop album ever recorded", stated that the record "outdid all expectations and has held up as perhaps the best hip-hop LP of all time." Bush also praised the group's use of the double bass, drums and samples: "It's a tribute to their unerring production sense that, with just those few tools, Tribe produced one of the best hip-hop albums in history, a record that sounds better with each listen. The Low End Theory is an unqualified success, the perfect marriage of intelligent, flowing raps to nuanced, groove-centered productions."

Writing for The Quietus, Angus Batey recognized the broad appeal of The Low End Theory as marking the group's ascent to a new level of artistic achievement by accomplishing a feat sought after by many artists concerned with authenticity: crossing over to a wider audience without compromising their integrity. Rather than softening their sound, the group produced an album that was tougher, darker, and, in many ways, more traditional in its adherence to hip-hop’s core principles than their earlier work. While some industry figures initially doubted this direction, the record resonated deeply with devoted hip-hop fans for its strong grounding in the genre’s foundational sonic, lyrical, and conceptual values. At the same time, it broadened the group’s appeal to listeners who typically avoided rap, uniting both dedicated followers and newcomers through music that prioritized integrity, creativity, and conviction over commercial considerations. Dave Heaton of PopMatters stated that the album is "the point where their sound truly came together", also describing it as a "remarkable experience, as aesthetically and emotionally rewarding as any work of music I can think of." For Time's All-Time 100 Albums, writer Josh Tyrangiel described the album as a "grand exception" to jazz rap being "more wishful thinking on the part of critics than anything actual", also calling it "socially conscious without being dull."

=== Accolades ===
Since its release, The Low End Theory has been included on several "best of" lists compiled by music writers and journalists.

Publication	Country	Accolade	Year	Rank	Ref
Apple Music	U.S.	100 Best Albums	2024	29	
The Arizona Republic	U.S.	8 Albums That VH1 Missed	2001	*	
Blender	U.S.	The 100 Greatest American Albums of All Time	2002	53	
Ego Trip	U.S.	Hip-hop's 25 Greatest Albums by Year 1980–1998	1999	2	
Kitsap Sun	U.S.	Top 200 Albums of the Last 40 Years	2005	151	
Mojo	U.K.	The Mojo Collection, Fourth Edition	2007	*	
Paul Morley	U.K.	100 Greatest Albums of All Time	2003	*	
Pitchfork	U.S.	Top 100 Albums of the 1990s	2003	56	
Robert Dimery	U.S.	1001 Albums You Must Hear Before You Die	2011	*	
Rolling Stone (guest article by Chris Rock)	U.S.	Top 25 Hip-Hop Albums	2005	9	
Rolling Stone	U.S.	100 Best Albums of the 90s	2010	36	
Rolling Stone	U.S.	The 500 Greatest Albums of All Time	2020	43	
Rolling Stone	U.S.	The Essential Recordings of the 90's	1999	*	
Spin	U.S.	Top 100 Alternative Albums	1995	87	
Spin	U.S.	100 Greatest Albums 1985–2005	2005	38	
Spin	U.S.	Top 90 Albums of the 90's	1999	32	
The Source	U.S.	100 Best Rap Albums of All Time	1998	*	
Time	U.S.	The All-TIME 100 Albums	2006	*	
Tom Moon	U.S.	1,000 Recordings to Hear Before You Die	2008	*	
Vibe	U.S.	100 Essential Albums of the 20th Century	1999	*	
Vibe	U.S.	51 Essential Albums	2004	*	
(*) designates lists which are unordered.

== Legacy and influence ==
Retrospective professional reviews
Review scores
Source	Rating
AllMusic	5/5 stars
And It Don't Stop	A
Christgau's Consumer Guide	(3-star Honorable Mention)
Encyclopedia of Popular Music	4/5 stars
MusicHound R&B	5/5 stars
The Rolling Stone Album Guide	5/5 stars
Spin	5/5 stars
Spin Alternative Record Guide	10/10
Tom Hull	A−

The Low End Theory is regarded as one of the most influential albums in hip-hop history, with Corbin Reiff of Complex declaring that it "broke major ground and pushed the sonic envelope of the entire rap genre." It is considered to have helped shape alternative hip-hop in the 1990s, as the group's "mellow innovations" helped jazz rap gain significant exposure from 1992 to 1993. With the album, the group is credited for showcasing how hip-hop was made before commercial success influenced many rappers' creativity, and for challenging the "macho posturing" of hardcore and gangsta rap.

The album is regarded as Phife Dawg's lyrical breakout, as he established himself as a formidable MC. A breakout verse by Leaders of the New School member Busta Rhymes, on the single "Scenario", led to stardom and helped launch his successful solo career. In addition, Q-Tip's rhyme on the single "Check the Rhime": "Industry rule number 4,080 / Record company people are shady" is one of the most quoted lines in hip-hop, while the album has been called the "Sgt. Pepper's of hip-hop" for its groundbreaking approach to hip-hop production and engineering. The album cover is regarded as one of the greatest and most iconic in hip-hop history; on a top 50 list by Complex, it was ranked number one.

The album is credited with establishing "the musical, cultural, and historical link between hip-hop and jazz", and is regarded as a "successful fusion of opposites: the complex musical textures of jazz and the straightforward boom-bap of rap." Writer Joseph Patel called it "a consummate link between generations", which took the essence of jazz and hip-hop, and "showing they originated from the same black center." Rolling Stone ranked the album at number 154 on its list of the 500 Greatest Albums of All Time in both 2003 and 2012 revisions, and in 2020, it moved up to number 43. Rolling Stone stated that people previously "connected the dots between hip-hop and jazz", as both were revolutionary forms of black music based on improvisation and flow, however, "this LP drew the entire picture." Writing for The New York Observer on the album's 25th anniversary, Ron Hart stated that The Low End Theory has become as integral to the vocabulary of modern jazz as Kind of Blue and A Love Supreme, crediting that its efforts of blending of hip-hop rhythms and jazz sensibilities laid the groundwork for later artists to merge the two genres even more fluidly than was possible in the early 1990s.

The Low End Theory has influenced many hip-hop and R&B musicians. According to Mychal Denzel Smith of Pitchfork: "Remove this record from the timeline, and generations of greatness could have disappeared with it." Producer 9th Wonder described the album as his "personal soundtrack" while growing up, also stating that the group "changed my life." He further commented on the influence of the group, noting that artists such as Phonte, Slum Village, Mos Def, Talib Kweli, The Roots, Pharrell Williams, and Outkast, all represent the far-reaching influence of A Tribe Called Quest. He explained that the group's creative legacy can be traced through a wide range of successors, forming a vast musical family tree that continues to shape hip-hop. The album has also influenced Kanye West, Common, D'Angelo, Jill Scott, Nas, Kendrick Lamar, Havoc, Madlib, Robert Glasper, and Dr. Dre, who produced his solo debut The Chronic after being inspired by the album. Musicians from other genres have also cited it as an influence, including rock musician Jack White and electronica musician James Lavelle. In 2022, the album was selected by the Library of Congress for preservation in the National Recording Registry for being "culturally, historically, or aesthetically significant".

== Track listing ==
No.	Title	Writer(s)	Length
1.	"Excursions"	Jonathan Davis	3:55
2.	"Buggin' Out"	Davis; Ali Shaheed Muhammad; Malik Taylor	3:37
3.	"Rap Promoter"	Davis; Muhammad	2:13
4.	"Butter"	Davis; Muhammad; Taylor	3:39
5.	"Verses from the Abstract" (featuring Vinia Mojica and Ron Carter)	Davis	3:59
6.	"Show Business" (featuring Diamond D, Lord Jamar and Sadat X)	Skeff Anselm; Davis; Lorenzo Dechalus; Joseph Kirkland; Muhammad; Derek Murphy; Taylor	3:53
7.	"Vibes and Stuff"	Davis; Taylor	4:18
8.	"The Infamous Date Rape"	Davis; Muhammad; Taylor	2:54
9.	"Check the Rhime"	Davis; Muhammad; Taylor	3:37
10.	"Everything Is Fair"	Anselm; Davis; Muhammad; Taylor	2:58
11.	"Jazz (We've Got)"	Davis; Muhammad; Taylor	4:10
12.	"Skypager"	Davis; Muhammad; Taylor	2:12
13.	"What?"	Davis	2:29
14.	"Scenario" (featuring Busta Rhymes, Charlie Brown and Dinco D)	Davis; Bryan Higgins; James Jackson; Muhammad; Trevor Smith; Taylor	4:10
Total length:			48:03

Sample credits

- "Excursions" contains a sample from "Time is Running Out" performed by the Last Poets.
- "Check The Rhime" contains a sample from "Love Your Life" performed by the Average White Band.
- "Everything Is Fair" contains a sample from "Let's Take It to the People" performed by Funkadelic.
- "Vibes And Stuff" contains a sample from "Down Here on the Ground" performed by Grant Green.

== Personnel ==
Credits are adapted from its liner notes.

Studios

- Recorded and mixed at Battery Studios, New York
- Recorded and mixed at Greene St. Recording, New York
- Recorded and mixed at Soundtrack Studios, New York
- Programmed at Jazzy Jay's Studio (6, 10)
- Mastered at DMS, New York

Musicians

- A Tribe Called Quest – production (all tracks)
- Ali Shaheed Muhammad – DJ (all tracks)
- Phife Dawg – vocals (all tracks)
- Q-Tip – vocals (all tracks)
- Ron Carter – double bass (5)
- Vinia Mojica – vocals (5)
- Skeff Anselm – production (6, 10); vocals (6)
- Lorenzo DeChalus – vocals (6)
- Joseph Kirkland – vocals (6)
- Derrick Murphy – vocals (6)
- Bryan Higgins – vocals (14)
- James Jackson – vocals (14)
- Trevor Smith Jr. – vocals (14)

Technical

- A Tribe Called Quest – arrangement, recording, mixing (all tracks)
- Bob Power – recording, mixing (all tracks)
- Tom Coyne – mastering (all tracks)
- Pete Christensen – engineering
- Eric Gast – engineering
- Rod Hui – engineering
- Gerald Julien – engineering
- Jim Kvoriak – engineering
- Tim Latham – engineering
- Anthony Saunders – engineering
- Chris Shaw – engineering
- Mark Singleton – engineering
- Jamey Staub – engineering
- Dan Wood – engineering
- Jean Kelly – design
- ZombArt – design, typography
- Joe Grant – photography

== Charts ==
=== Weekly charts ===
1991 weekly chart performance for The Low End Theory
Chart (1991)	Peak position
UK Albums (Official Charts)	58
US Billboard 200	45
US Top R&B/Hip-Hop Albums (Billboard)	13

2024–2025 weekly chart performance for The Low End Theory
Chart (2024–2025)	Peak position
Scottish Albums (Official Charts)	20
UK Albums Sales (OCC)	21
UK R&B Albums (Official Charts)	30

2026 weekly chart performance for The Low End Theory
Chart (2026)	Peak position
Greek Albums (IFPI)	78

=== Year-end charts ===
Year-end chart performance for The Low End Theory
Chart (1992)	Position
US Top R&B/Hip-Hop Albums (Billboard)	23

== Certifications ==
Certifications for The Low End Theory
Region	Certification	Certified units/sales
United Kingdom (BPI)	Gold	100,000^{‡}
United States (RIAA)	Platinum	1,000,000^{^}
^{^} Shipments figures based on certification alone.^{‡} Sales+streaming figures based on certification alone.

== See also ==
- Progressive rap
