= Rahsaan Patterson discography =

- Studio albums: 6
- Compilation albums: 1
- Singles: 20
- Music videos: 8
- Other appearances: 12

This article contains the discography of American soul and R&B singer-songwriter Rahsaan Patterson, it includes studio albums, compilation albums, singles and music videos.

== Albums ==
Title	Album details	Peak positions		
Title	Album details	US	US R&B	US IND
Rahsaan Patterson	Released: January 28, 1997; Label: MCA; Formats: CD, LP, cassette	—	48	—
Love in Stereo	Released: October 19, 1999; Label: MCA; Formats: CD, LP, cassette	—	51	—
After Hours	Released: October 26, 2004; Label: Artistry; Formats: CD, LP, download	—	65	—
Wines & Spirits	Released: September 25, 2007; Label: Artistry; Formats: CD, download	—	42	45
The Ultimate Gift	Released: August 26, 2008; Label: Artistry Music; Formats: CD, LP, download	—	50	—
Bleuphoria	Released: July 19, 2011; Label: Artistry Music; Formats: CD, download	—	36	42
Heroes & Gods	Released: May 17, 2019; Label: Shanachie; Formats: CD, download	—	—	29
"—" denotes items that did not chart or were not released in that territory.

== Singles ==
Title	Year	Chart Positions		Album
Title	Year	US R&B	US Adult R&B	Album
"Stop By"	1996	—	23	Rahsaan Patterson
"Where You Are"	1997	53	18	Rahsaan Patterson
"Spend the Night"	1997	—	13	Rahsaan Patterson
"Treat You Like a Queen"	1999	61	10	Love in Stereo
"The Moment"	1999	—	—	Love in Stereo
"It's Alright Now"	2000	—	23	Love in Stereo
"April's Kiss"	2004	—	—	After Hours
"So Hot"	2005	—	—	After Hours
"Forever Yours"	2005	—	17	After Hours
"Stop Breaking My Heart"	2007	59	17	Wines & Spirits
"Feels Good"	2008	76	20	Wines & Spirits
"Easier Said Than Done"	2010	—	27	Bleuphoria
"6 AM"	2011	95	29	Bleuphoria
"Feels Good" (featuring Faith Evans & Shanice)	2011	97	20	Bleuphoria
"Sent From Heaven"	2019	—	25	Heroes & Gods
"Don't You Know That"	2020	—	23	Heroes & Gods

== Album appearances ==
=== As featured artist ===
Year	Title	Artist	Album
2003	"Fly High"	Brian Culbertson	Come on Up
2003	"Take Me Home" (Ciro Mix)	Sara Devine	Take Me Home (12")
2004	"No More Tears (Enough Is Enough)"	Paulini	One Determined Heart
2004	"Watching You"	Avani	The Real Thing
2004	"Beautiful Life"	Guy Sebastian	Beautiful Life
2005	"Say It Ain't So"	Jimmy Barnes	Double Happiness
2005	"What Am I Gonna Do?"	Jimmy Sommers	Lovelife
2005	We Livin' Now	FOKIS	More Than One Way
2005	"Love's Taken Over"	U-Nam	The Past Builds The Future
2006	"Rock Ya Baby" (feat. Rahsaan Patterson & MC Surreal)	DJ Peril	King of the Beats
2006	"That's The Way"	Steve 'The Scotsman' Harvey	The Everyday People Project
2007	"If You Really Love"	Mikelyn Roderick	Copasetic Is
2007	"We Are One"	Ledisi	Lost & Found
2008	"Dream Flight"	Angela Johnson	A Woman's Touch
2012	"Nights (Feel Like Gettin' Down)"	Sy Smith	Fast and Curious
2016	"Still Euge (Much Love)"	Euge Groove	Still Euge

== Other appearances ==
=== Soundtracks ===
Year	Title	Album
1996	"Where You Are"	Bulletproof OST
1997	"Street Life"	Hoodlum OST
2001	"So Hot"	Two Can Play That Game OST
2002	"You Make Life So Good"	Brown Sugar OST

=== Others ===
Year	Title	Album
1999	"Christmas at My House"	My Christmas Album
2002	"The One For Me"	Sign of Things To Come
2005	Soul Show Tune	Ferry Maat's Soul Show: Saturday Night Grooves
2005	"If"	Soul Lounge
2005	"What Am I Gonna Do?" (with Jimmy Sommers)	Soul Lounge
2006	"Right Away"	Soul Lounge 2
2006	"Lifetime"	Soul Lounge 3
2006	"4Ever" (with Mr. Timothy)	Soul Lounge 3
2007	"Straighten It Out"	Soul Lounge 4
2008	"Oh Lord (Take Me Back)"	Soul Lounge 5
2008	"The Best"	Soul Lounge 5

== Videography ==
=== Music videos ===
1. 1996: "Stop By"
2. 1997: "Where You Are"
3. 1999: "Treat You Like a Queen"
4. 2004: "The One for Me"
5. 2007: "Stop Breaking My Heart"
6. 2008: "Feels Good"
7. 2010: "Easier Said Than Done"
8. 2011: "6 AM"
