= Tom Saviano =

American jazz musician (born 1948)

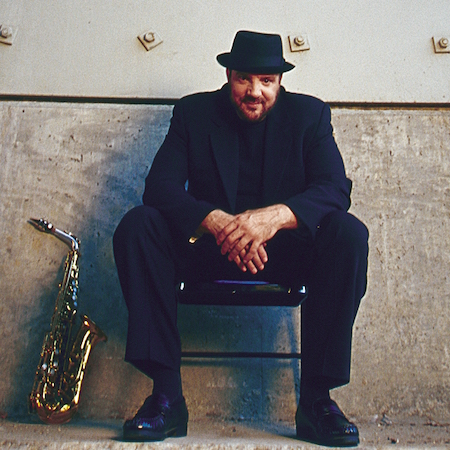

Background information
- Born: Tom Richard Saviano; June 29, 1949 (age 77); Chicago, Illinois, U.S.
- Genres: Jazz; funk; R&B; rock; pop
- Occupations: Musician; composer; arranger; producer
- Instruments: Saxophone, keyboards
- Years active: 1973–present
- Label: Obsessed with the Groove
- Formerly of: Odyssey; Heat; Sender; The Sons of Champlin

Tom Richard Saviano (born June 29, 1949) is an American saxophonist, composer, arranger, and producer.

== Early life ==
Saviano was born in Chicago, Illinois, to Albert and Dorthy Saviano. His father, Al, was a student of jazz trumpeter Zilner Randolph, best known for his work with Louis Armstrong, Woody Herman, and Duke Ellington. Al then became a big band conductor and arranger in Chicago, which contributed to Tom's early exposure to music. His family moved to Huntington Beach, California in the late 1960s when Saviano was 17 years old.

== Career ==
=== Music ===
Saviano's professional career began after moving to Los Angeles in the early 1970s. In 1975, Vini Poncia, who was writing and producing for Ringo Starr at the time, began hiring Saviano for horn arrangements and saxophone solos. Sessions that Poncia hired him for included David Pomeranz, the Faragher Brothers, and Melissa Manchester. With Manchester, Saviano arranged and played saxophone on three of her albums: Help Is on the Way, Singin', and Don‘t Cry Out Loud. His first major gig came as Manchester's musical director during the recording of Singin' in 1977. He also toured with Manchester, assembling her backing band and playing saxophone and keyboards.

He went on to record with many other artists, including Dolly Parton (on the Grammy Award-winning hit "9 to 5"), Earth, Wind & Fire (on the Grammy Award-winning hit "Wanna Be with You"), and Sheena Easton (for whom he wrote the hit single "Hard to Say It’s Over"). In 2004, he recorded with Ray Charles on the multi-Grammy award winning album Genius Loves Company. In 2015, he composed, arranged, and produced the song “Lucky Chance” from the album “Back to You” by Arno Haas, featuring Al Jarreau. It was one of Jarreau's last jazz/pop recordings before his death in February 2017.

==== Heat ====
In November 1979, Saviano formed the group Heat, which released two albums on MCA Records, Heat and Still Waitin'. The group had two Top 40 R&B hits, "Just Like You" and "This Love That We Found." On both albums, he produced, arranged, wrote and/or co-wrote all of the songs, and played saxophone and keyboards. Heat did not release another album until Revisited in 2013.

==== Bill Champlin and the Sons of Champlin ====
Saviano has had a long working relationship with Bill Champlin, with whom he wrote the song "Holdin' On" for Chicago's 1991 album "Twenty 1." He performed on Champlin's albums "Through It All" (1994), He Started to Sing (1995), Mayday (1997), and No Place Left to Fall (2008). He was a member of Champlin's band, The Sons of Champlin, on their 1997 reunion tour and following albums. One performance on that tour was at the "30th Anniversary of The Summer of Love" concert held in Golden Gate Park, which also featured Jefferson Airplane, John Handy and members of the Grateful Dead. Champlin provided vocals on Saviano's 2000 album Crossings.

=== Television ===
Saviano has written, produced, and performed several arrangements for television. He was the bandleader and conductor for David Letterman’s first pilot, Leave It to Dave, and a producer, composer, and performer for Showtime’s Aerobicise, which reached number one on the Billboard Videos chart. For its entire run from 1986 to 1988, Saviano was a band member on The Late Show with Joan Rivers. Recent television work includes Karen Sisco and Family Guy.

== Discography ==
=== As leader ===
- Making Up Lost Time (Break Away, 1996)
- Crossings (Obsessed with the Groove, 2000)

=== As a member ===
==== Odyssey ====
- Electric One (Tiger Lily, 1976)

==== Heat ====
- Heat (MCA, 1980) – producer
- Still Waiting (MCA, 1981) – producer
- Revisited (Vivid Sound, 2013) – producer
- Put Your Trust in Love (ft. Jevon McGlory & Horn Engine) (Bad Hat, 2023) – producer

==== Sender ====
- Exiled on Earth (RCA, 1984)

==== The Sons of Champlin ====
- Live (Grateful Dead, 1998) – producer
- Secret (2004)
- Hip Li'l Dreams (DIG Music, 2005) – producer

=== As producer ===
- Chris Bennett, Chris Bennett (Beachwood, 1993)
- Thom Rotella, A Day in the Life (Trippin 'N' Rhythm Records, 2002)
- Romina Arena, You're Gonna Hear from Me (Outback Records, 2006)
- Cara-C, Starchild (Clarion, 2007)
- Chris Bennett, Girl Talk (Renegade Entertainment, 2008)
- Denise DeCaro, Love Always (2008)
- Cara-C, Clouds of Magellan (Forever Love, 2009)
- Arno Haas, Magic Hands (2013)
- David Krapes, DK Tonight (Artifex, 2014)
- Arno Haas, Back to You (Mochermusic, 2015)
- Al Jarreau, Lucky Chance (2015)
- Horn Engine, The World Above (2021)
- Horn Engine, Let Me Stay (2021)
- Denise DeCaro, No Ending (2025)

=== As composer ===
- Churchill, Counterspies 38 (AVI, 1973)
- Gino Cunico, Gino Cunico (Arista, 1976)
- Sheena Easton, A Private Heaven (EMI America, 1984)
- Chicago, Twenty 1 (Reprise, 1991)

=== As sideman ===
==== With David Diggs ====
- First Flight (Essar, 1973)
- Out on a Limb (PBR, 1976)
- Nothing But the Truth (Artful Balance, 1989)
- Tell Me Again (Artful Balance, 1991)
- Westcoastal (Cool Sound, 1999)

==== With Melissa Manchester ====
- Help Is on the Way (Arista, 1976)
- Singin' (Arista, 1977)
- Don't Cry Out Loud (Arista, 1978)
- Live '77 (2022)

==== With Dolly Parton ====
- Dolly, Dolly, Dolly (RCA, 1980)
- 9 to 5 and Odd Jobs (RCA, 1980)
- Hearbreak Express (RCA, 1982)

==== With Bill Champlin ====
- Through It All (Beverly, 1994)
- He Started to Sing (Beverly, 1995)
- Mayday (Turnip the Music Group, 1997)
- No Place Left to Fall (DreamMakers, 2008)

==== With AOR ====
- L.A. Reflection (FS Records, 2002)
- Dreaming of L.A. (AOR Heaven, 2003)
- L.A Concession (MTM Classix, 2006)
- The Colors of L.A. (AOR Blvd., 2012)

=== With others ===
- David Pomeranz, It's in Everyone of Us (Arista, 1975)
- Faragher Bros., The Faragher Brothers (ABC, 1976)
- Dwight Twilley Band, Twilley Don’t Mind (Shelter, 1977)
- Paul Anka, Listen to Your Heart (RCA, 1978)
- Shirley Bessey, The Magic Is You (United Artists, 1978)
- Lynda Carter, Portrait (Epic, 1978)
- Valerie Carter, Wild Child (Columbia, 1978)
- Peter Criss, Peter Criss (Casablanca, 1978)
- Mac Davis, Fantasy (Columbia, 1978)
- Dane Donohue, Dane Donohue (Columbia, 1978)
- Kaze, Moony Night (Panam, 1978)
- Neil Merryweather, Differences (GIP, 1978)
- Leo Sayer, Leo Sayer (Chrysalis, 1978)
- Dusty Springfield, Living Without Your Love (United Artists, 1978)
- Ringo Starr, Bad Boy (Polydor, 1978)
- Tan Tan, Trying to Get to You (Invitation, 1978)
- Livingston Taylor, 3-Way Mirror (Epic, 1978)
- Mary Travers, It's in Everyone of Us (Chrysalis, 1978)
- Alessi Brothers, Words and Music (A&M, 1979)
- Paul Anka, Headlines (RCA, 1979)
- Lynn Anderson, Outlaw Is Just a State of Mind (Columbia, 1979)
- Cheryl Ladd, Dance Forever (Capitol, 1979)
- Mireille Mathieu Chante Paul Anka, Toi Et Moi (Polydor, 1979)
- Michael Nesmith, Infinite Rider on the Big Dogma (Pacific Arts, 1979)
- Juice Newton, Take Heart (Capitol, 1979)
- Tony Orlando, I Got Rhythm (Casablanca, 1979)
- Raydio, Rock On (Arista, 1979)
- Brenda Russell, Brenda Russell (Horizon, 1979)
- Westside Strutters, Gershwin '79 (Parachute, 1979)
- Michel Berger, Beauséjour (Warner Bros., 1980)
- Miguel Bosé, Miguel (CBS, 1980)
- Glen Campbell, Somethin' 'Bout You Baby I Like (Capitol, 1980)
- Sandy Farina, All Alone in the Night (MCA, 1980)
- Tony Orlando, Livin' for the Music (Casablanca, 1980)
- Paul-Jean Borowsky, Le Silence Est D'or (RCA, 1981)
- Roberto Carlos, Roberto Carlos (CBS, 1981)
- China, China (Epic, 1981)
- Rita Coolidge, Heartbreak Radio (A&M, 1981)
- Earth, Wind & Fire, Raise! (ARC, 1981)
- Joe Egan, Map (Ariola, 1981)
- The Four Tops, Tonight! (Casablanca, 1981)
- Glen Campbell, It's the World Gone Crazy (Capitol, 1981)
- Greg Phillinganes, Significant Gains (Planet, 1981)
- Harry James and His Orchestra / Akira Inoue Band, I've Heard That Song 30 Years Before (Toshiba, 1981)
- Sarah Dash, Close Enough (Kirshner, 1981)
- Swing, Swing (Planet, 1981)
- Donn Thomas, You're the One (Myrrh, 1981)
- Michel Berger, Dreams in Stone (Atlantic, 1982)
- The Kids from Fame, Songs (BBC, 1982)
- B. J. Thomas, As We Know Him (MCA, 1982)
- Bob Bailey, I'm Walkin' (Light, 1983)
- Thelma Houston, Thelma Houston (MCA, 1983)
- Shiva, 20 Minute Workout (The Original Music) (Chadwick Music Productions Inc., 1983)
- The Boys, Messages from the Boys (Motown, 1988)
- Greg & Bev Smith, No Baggage (Virgin, 1987)
- Stix Hooper, Lay It on the Line (Artful Balance, 1989)
- Zoltán Erika, Ki Nevet A Végén? (New Tone, 1990)
- Steve Plunkett, My Attitude (Quality, 1991)
- Phil Driscoll, Inner Man (Artful Balance, 1994)
- Kassav', Difé (Columbia, 1995)
- Rahsaan Patterson, Rahsaan Patterson (MCA, 1997)
- Bamboleo, Yo No Me Parezco A Nadie (Ahi-Nama, 1998)
- The Mike Reilly Band, Who's Been Sleeping in My Bed (Award, 1998)
- Francis Rocco Prestia, ...Everybody on the Bus (P-Vine Non Stop, 1998)
- The Randy Waldman Trio, Wigged Out (Whirlybird, 1998)
- Rahsaan Patterson, Love in Stereo (MCA, 1999)
- Phil Upchurch, Rhapsody & Blues (Go Jazz, 1999)
- Ryan DeHues, My Dream Come True (Honest, 2001)
- Björn Skifs, Back on Track (EMI, 2001)
- Dana Glover, Testimony (DreamWorks, 2002)
- Les McCann, Pump It Up (ESC Records, 2002)
- Tim McGraw, Tim McGraw and the Dancehall Doctors (Curb, 2002)
- Ray Charles, Genius Loves Company (Concord Records, 2004)
- Susie Chin, ShameLess (2004)
- Mike Costley, I Am a Singer (Mirada, 2005)
- Neil Diamond, 12 Songs (American, 2005)
- Jemima Puddle-Duck, Love at First Fire (Hitchcock Media, 2005)
- Radioactive, Taken (Nexus, 2005)
- Steppin' to Jazz 2 (Steppin' Muzak, 2006)
- Steve Madaio, Midnight Rendezvous (Mirada, 2006)
- Meat Loaf, Bat Out of Hell III: The Monster Is Loose (Mercury, 2006)
- Barry Minniefield, Give Me Love (Mirada, 2006)
- Steve Ferrone's Farm Fur, More Head (Drumroll, 2006)
- Maroon 5, It Won’t Be Soon Before Long (A&M Octone, 2007)
- Gino Matteo, I've Been Thinkin' (Iridium, 2007)
- Lamb & Meyer, Don't Get No Better (Bluehour, 2009)
- Muse, The 2nd Law (Warner Bros., 2012)
- Carmen Grillo, A Different World (2013)
- Bobby Rush with Blinddog Smokin' featuring the Legendary Dr. John, Decisions (Silver Talon, 2014)
- Pinnacle Point, Winds of Change (Perris, 2017)
- Jevon McGlory, Keep My Love Alive (Sid-Sav, 2023)
- The Stylistics, Falling in Love with My Girl (2025)

=== Soundtracks ===
- The Panther Squad (1984)
- Ghost Fever (1987)
- Impulse (1990)
- American Pastime, Safe at Home (2007)
- Curse of the Chippendales (2021)
