= Easier Said Than Done =

Easier Said Than Done may refer to:

- Easier Said Than Done (album), 2025 album by Pool Kids
- "Easier Said Than Done" (The Essex song), 1963
- "Easier Said Than Done" (Radney Foster song), 1993
- "Easier Said Than Done" (Rahsaan Patterson song), 2010
