= List of awards and nominations received by Outkast =

This is the list of awards and nominations received by American hip hop duo Outkast.

== American Music Awards ==
Year	Nominee / work	Award	Result	Ref
2003	Outkast	Favorite Soul/R&B Band/Duo/Group	Won	
2004	Outkast	Artist of the Year	Nominated	
2004	Outkast	Favorite Pop/Rock Band/Duo/Group	Won	
2004	Outkast	Favorite Rap/Hip-Hop Band/Duo/Group	Won	
2004	Speakerboxxx/The Love Below	Favorite Rap/Hip-Hop Album	Won	

== BET Awards ==
Year	Nominee / work	Award	Result	Ref
2001	"Ms. Jackson"	Video of the Year	Won	
2001	Outkast	Best Group	Won	
2002	Outkast	Best Group	Won	
2004	"Hey Ya!"	Video of the Year	Won	
2004	"Hey Ya!"	Viewer's Choice	Nominated	
2004	"The Way You Move" (featuring Sleepy Brown)	Video of the Year	Nominated	
2004	"The Way You Move" (featuring Sleepy Brown)	Best Collaboration	Nominated	
2004	Outkast	Best Group	Won	
2007	Outkast	Best Group	Nominated	
2008	"International Players Anthem (I Choose You)" (with UGK)	Video of the Year	Won	

== BET Hip Hop Awards ==
Year	Nominee / work	Award	Result	Ref
2007	"International Players Anthem (I Choose You)" (with UGK)	Best Collaboration	Won	
2007	"International Players Anthem (I Choose You)" (with UGK)	Best Video	Nominated	

== Black Reel Awards ==
Year	Nominee / work	Award	Result
2007	Idlewild	Outstanding Original Score	Nominated
2007	"Idlewild Blue (Don'tchu Worry 'Bout Me)"	Outstanding Original Song	Nominated

== Brit Awards ==
Year	Nominee / work	Award	Result	Ref
2004	Speakerboxxx/The Love Below	International Album	Nominated	
2004	Outkast	International Group	Nominated	
2005	Speakerboxxx/The Love Below	International Album	Nominated	
2005	Outkast	International Group	Nominated	

== Grammy Awards ==
Year	Nominee / work	Award	Result	Ref
1999	"Rosa Parks"	Best Rap Performance by a Duo or Group	Nominated	
2002	"Ms. Jackson"	Record of the Year	Nominated	
2002	"Ms. Jackson"	Best Rap Performance by a Duo or Group	Won	
2002	"Ms. Jackson"	Best Music Video	Nominated	
2002	Stankonia	Album of the Year	Nominated	
2002	Stankonia	Best Rap Album	Won	
2003	"The Whole World" (featuring Killer Mike)	Best Rap Performance by a Duo or Group	Won	
2004	"Hey Ya!"	Record of the Year	Nominated	
2004	"Hey Ya!"	Best Urban/Alternative Performance	Won	
2004	"Hey Ya!"	Best Music Video	Nominated	
2004	Speakerboxxx/The Love Below	Album of the Year	Won	
2004	Speakerboxxx/The Love Below	Best Rap Album	Won	
2004	Outkast	Producer of the Year, Non-Classical	Nominated	
2007	"Idlewild Blue (Don't Chu Worry 'Bout Me)"	Best Urban/Alternative Performance	Nominated	
2007	"Mighty O"	Best Rap Performance by a Duo or Group	Nominated	
2008	"International Players Anthem (I Choose You)" (with UGK)	Best Rap Performance by a Duo or Group	Nominated	

== MTV Europe Music Awards ==
Year	Nominee / work	Award	Result
2001	"Ms. Jackson"	Best Video	Nominated
2001	Outkast	Best Hip-Hop	Nominated
2001	Outkast	Best R&B	Nominated
2004	Speakerboxxx/The Love Below	Best Album	Nominated
2004	"Hey Ya!"	Best Song	Won
2004	"Hey Ya!"	Best Video	Won
2004	Outkast	Best Group	Won
2004	Outkast	Best R&B	Nominated
2006	Outkast	Best R&B	Nominated

== MTV Video Music Awards ==
Year	Nominee / work	Award	Result
2001	"Ms. Jackson"	Best Hip-Hop Video	Won
2001	"Ms. Jackson"	Best Direction	Nominated
2002	"The Whole World" (featuring Killer Mike)	Best Hip-Hop Video	Nominated
2004	"Hey Ya!"	Video of the Year	Won
2004	"Hey Ya!"	Best Hip-Hop Video	Won
2004	"Hey Ya!"	Best Direction	Nominated
2004	"Hey Ya!"	Best Visual Effects	Won
2004	"Hey Ya!"	Best Art Direction	Won

== MTV Video Music Awards Japan ==
Year	Nominee / work	Award	Result
2004	Speakerboxxx/The Love Below	Album of the Year	Won
2004	"Hey Ya!"	Video of the Year	Nominated
2004	"Hey Ya!"	Best Pop Video	Nominated

== Nickelodeon Kids' Choice Awards ==
Year	Nominee / work	Award	Result
2004	"Hey Ya!"	Favorite Song	Won
2004	Outkast	Favorite Music Group	Won
2005	Outkast	Favorite Music Group	Nominated

== Soul Train Music Awards ==
Year	Nominee / work	Award	Result
1997	ATLiens	Best Album of the Year	Nominated
1999	Aquemini	Best R&B/Soul Album – Group, Band or Duo	Nominated
2001	"Ms. Jackson"	Best Video of the Year	Nominated
2004	Speakerboxxx/The Love Below	Best Album of the Year	Won
2004	Outkast	Sammy Davis Jr. – Entertainer of the Year	Won
2004	"Hey Ya!"	Best Video of the Year	Won
2005	"Roses"	Best Video of the Year	Nominated

== The Source Awards ==
Year	Nominee / work	Award	Result	Ref
1995	Outkast	New Artist of the Year, Group	Won	
1995	Southernplayalisticadillacmuzik	Album of the Year	Nominated	
1999	Outkast	Artist of the Year, Group	Won	
1999	Aquemini	Album of the Year	Nominated	
1999	Outkast	Live Performer of the Year	Nominated	
2001	Outkast	Artist of the Year, Group	Won	
2001	Stankonia	Album of the Year	Nominated	
2001	"Ms. Jackson"	Single of the Year	Nominated	
2001	Outkast	Live Performer of the Year	Won	
2001	"B.O.B"	Music Video of the Year	Nominated	
2004	Outkast	Artist of the Year, Group	Nominated	
2004	"The Way You Move"	Single of the Year, Group	Nominated	

== Teen Choice Awards ==
Year	Nominee / work	Award	Result
2001	Outkast	Choice Music: R&B/Hip Hop Artist	Nominated
2001	"Ms. Jackson"	Choice Music: R&B/Hip Hop Track	Nominated
2004	Speakerboxxx/The Love Below	Choice Music: Album	Nominated
2004	"The Way You Move" (featuring Sleepy Brown)	Choice Music: Hook Up	Nominated
2004	"The Way You Move" (featuring Sleepy Brown)	Choice Music: Hip-Hop/Rap Track	Nominated
2004	"Hey Ya!"	Choice Music: Single	Nominated
