= 1999 Source Awards =

Annual award ceremony

The Source Awards
- Date: August 18, 1999
- Location: Pantages Theatre (Los Angeles, California)
- Country: United States
- First award: 1994

Highlights
- Most awards: DMX (2); Lauryn Hill (2)

The 1999 Source Awards was held at the Pantages Theatre in Hollywood, Los Angeles, California on August 18, 1999.

Winners were picked by editors of The Source magazine, based on music released between April 1, 1998, and March 31, 1999. It was broadcast on the UPN network on August 20, 1999.

== Winners and nominees ==
Winners are in bold text.

=== Artist of the Year (group) ===
- **Outkast**
  - A Tribe Called Quest
  - Gang Starr
  - Goodie Mob
  - The Roots

=== Artist of the Year (solo) ===
- **DMX**
  - Busta Rhymes
  - Jay-Z
  - Master P
  - Snoop Dogg

=== New Artist of the Year (solo) ===
- **Lauryn Hill**
  - Big Pun
  - Eminem
  - Juvenile
  - Noreaga

=== Rap Album of the Year ===
- **Lauryn Hill – The Miseducation of Lauryn Hill**
  - DMX – It's Dark and Hell Is Hot
  - 8Ball – Lost
  - Jay-Z – Vol. 2... Hard Knock Life
  - Master P – MP da Last Don
  - Outkast – Aquemini

=== Single of the Year ===
- **Juvenile – "Ha"**
  - Big Pun featuring Joe – "Still Not a Player"
  - Jayo Felony featuring DMX and Method Man – "Whatcha Gonna Do?"
  - Jay-Z featuring Ja Rule and Amil – "Can I Get A..."
  - Jermaine Dupri featuring Jay-Z – "Money Ain't a Thang"
  - Silkk the Shocker featuring Mystikal – "It Ain't My Fault"

=== Live Performer of the Year (group or solo) ===
- **DMX**
  - Busta Rhymes
  - Method Man & Redman
  - Outkast
  - The Roots

=== Video of the Year ===
- **Busta Rhymes featuring Janet Jackson – "What's It Gonna Be?!"**
  - Busta Rhymes – "Turn It Up (Remix) / Fire It Up"
  - Made Men featuring Master P – "Is It You? (Déjà Vu)"
  - Redman – "I'll Bee Dat!"
  - Xzibit – "What U See Is What U Get"

=== Lifetime Achievement Award ===
- **Russell Simmons**

=== Pioneer Award ===
- **DJ Kool Herc**
- **Afrika Bambaataa**
- **Grandmaster Flash**
