= Doc's da Name 2000 =

Studio album by Redman
- Released: December 8, 1998
- Recorded: 1997–1998
- Genre: Hip-hop
- Length: 69:57
- Labels: Def Squad; Def Jam
- Producers: Erick Sermon (also exec.); Reggie Noble; Rockwilder; Roni Size; Gov Mattic

Redman chronology
El Niño (1998)	Doc's da Name 2000 (1998)	Blackout! (1999)

Singles from Doc's da Name 2000
- 1. "I'll Bee Dat!" Released: December 8, 1998; 2. "Da Goodness" Released: January 12, 1999

Professional ratings
Review scores
Source	Rating
AllMusic	4/5 stars
Christgau's Consumer Guide	A−
The Encyclopedia of Popular Music	4/5 stars
Los Angeles Times	3.5/4 stars
NME	8/10
RapReviews	8/10
Rolling Stone	4/5 stars

Doc's da Name 2000 is the fourth studio album by American rapper Redman. The album was released on Def Squad Records and Def Jam Recordings on December 8, 1998. It peaked at number 11 on the US Billboard 200. It was a top seller, being certified platinum for sales of over a million copies.

The song "Da Goodness'' is sampled in the Barbadian soca beat "Redman/Da Goodness Riddim" in 1999. The song "Let da Monkey Out" was featured in the 2005 film Syriana.

== Commercial performance ==
Doc's da Name 2000 debuted at number 11 on the US Billboard 200 chart, and number one on the US Top R&B/Hip-Hop Albums, becoming his third number one on the chart. On February 17, 1999, the album was certified platinum by the Recording Industry Association of America (RIAA) for sales of over a million copies. The album was certified only two months after being released. As of October 2009, the album has 1,056,000 copies in the United States being Redman's best selling album.

== Track listing ==
No.	Title	Writer(s)	Producer(s)	Length
1.	"Welcome 2 da Bricks"	Reginald Noble; Kenneth Gamble; Leon Huff; John Whitehead; Gene McFadden; Billy Paul	Reggie Noble	1:55
2.	"Let da Monkey Out"	Noble; Erick Sermon	Erick Sermon	3:35
3.	"I'll Bee Dat!"	Noble; Dana Stinson; Moses Davis; Jeremy Harding; Ahmir Thompson; Tariq Trotter; Malik Smart; Kenyatta Saunders; James Gray	Rockwilder	4:34
4.	"Get It Live"	Noble; Sermon	Erick Sermon	3:26
5.	"Who Took da Satellite Van? (Skit)"			0:46
6.	"Jersey Yo!"	Noble; O'Shea Jackson; Anthony Wheaton; Betty Mabry	Reggie Noble; Gov Mattic	3:33
7.	"Cloze Ya Doorz" (featuring Diezzel Don, Double-O, Gov Mattic, Roz, and Young Zee)	Noble; Sermon	Erick Sermon	3:59
8.	"I Don't Kare"	Noble; Sermon; Victor Santiago; Pharrell Williams; Chad Hugo; Debbie Harry; Chris Stein; Kirk Robinson; Nat Robinson	Erick Sermon; Reggie Noble	3:28
9.	"Boodah Break"	Noble; Sermon; Joseph Simmons; Russell Simmons; Darryl McDaniels; David Reeves	Erick Sermon	2:17
10.	"Million Chicken March (2 Hot 4 TV) (Skit)"			1:21
11.	"Keep on '99"	Noble; Sermon; Colin Wolfe; Andre Young; Eric Wright; Lorenzo Paterson; Tracy Curry; Nick Zesses; Dino Fekaris; Traci Nelson; Keith Crouch; Rahsaan Patterson; Kipper Jones	Erick Sermon	4:30
12.	"Well All Rite Cha" (featuring Method Man)	Noble; Sermon; Clifford Smith	Erick Sermon	4:15
13.	"Pain in da Ass Stewardess (Skit)"			2:05
14.	"Da Goodness" (featuring Busta Rhymes)	Noble; Trevor Smith; Irving Mills; Duke Ellington; Juan Tizol	Reggie Noble	4:10
15.	"My Zone!" (featuring Markie (aka Mr. Cream))	Noble; Sermon; T. Wertz; Lawrence Muggerud; Lowell Fulson; Senen Reyes; Louis Freese; Jimmy McCracklin	Reggie Noble	2:54
16.	"Da Da DaHHH"	Noble; Sermon; Arthur G. Wright	Erick Sermon	4:07
17.	"G.P.N. (Skit)"			2:07
18.	"Down South Funk" (featuring Erick Sermon and Keith Murray)	Noble; Sermon; Keith Murray; Richard Walters; Douglas Davis	Erick Sermon	3:51
19.	"D.O.G.S."	Noble; Sermon; Missy Elliott; Timothy Mosley; George Clinton; David Spradley; Garry Shider	Erick Sermon	3:51
20.	"Beet Drop"	Noble; Rick Rubin; Adam Yauch; Adam Horovitz; Michael Diamond	Reggie Noble	1:18
21.	"We Got da Satellite Van! (Skit)"			0:56
22.	"Brick City Mashin'!"	Noble; Sermon; Chris Frantz; Tina Weymouth; Steven Stanley	Erick Sermon	3:10
23.	"Soopaman Lova IV" (featuring Dave Hollister)	Noble; Johnny "Guitar" Watson	Reggie Noble	2:33
24.	"I Got a Seecret"	Noble; Roni Size	Roni Size	3:43
Total length:				69:57

== Samples ==
Welcome 2 da Bricks

- "Black Wonders of the World" by Billy Paul

Let da Monkey Out

- "Stomp and Buck Dance" by the Crusaders

Get It Live

- "Just Rhymin' with Biz" by Big Daddy Kane

Jersey Yo!

- "Shoo-B-Doop and Cop Him" by Betty Davis

I Don't Kare

- "The Champ" by the Mohawks
- "Super Thug" by N.O.R.E
- "Top Billin'" by Audio Two

Boodah Break

- "Beats to the Rhyme" by Run-DMC
- "Caught, Can I Get a Witness?" by Public Enemy

Keep On '99

- "Can't Run, Can't Hide" by Ray J
- "She Swallowed It" by N.W.A

Da Goodness

- "Caravan" by Buddy Merrill
- "It's All About the Benjamins" by Puff Daddy

My Zone!

- "How I Could Just Kill a Man" by Cypress Hill

Da Da Dahhh

- "It's a Sad Song" by Don Julian

Down South Funk

- "La Di Da Di" by Doug E. Fresh and Slick Rick

D.O.G.S.

- "Ladies in da House" by Aaliyah
- "Atomic Dog" by George Clinton

Brick City Mashin'!

- "Genius of Love" by Tom Tom Club
- "Triple Threat" by Z-3 MC's

Soopaman Lova IV

- "You've Got a Hard Head" by Johnny "Guitar" Watson

I Got a Seecret

- "Around the World" by Attilio Mineo

== Charts ==
=== Weekly charts ===
Chart (1998)	Peak position
US Billboard 200	11
US Top R&B/Hip-Hop Albums (Billboard)	1

=== Year-end charts ===
Chart (1999)	Position
US Billboard 200	94
US Top R&B/Hip-Hop Albums (Billboard)	22

== Certifications ==
Region	Certification	Certified units/sales
Canada (Music Canada)	Gold	50,000^{^}
United States (RIAA)	Platinum	1,000,000^{^}
^{^} Shipments figures based on certification alone.

== See also ==
- List of number-one R&B albums of 1998 (U.S.)
