= Somethin' 'Bout You Baby I Like (Glen Campbell album) =

Studio album by Glen Campbell
- Released: June 1980
- Recorded: 1980
- Studio: Sound Lab (Hollywood); Capitol (Hollywood)
- Label: Capitol
- Producer: Gary Klein

Glen Campbell chronology
Highwayman (1979)	Somethin' 'Bout You Baby I Like (1980)	It's the World Gone Crazy (1981)

Somethin' 'Bout You Baby I Like is the thirty-sixth album by American singer/guitarist Glen Campbell, released in 1980.

The title track, first recorded by Tom Jones in 1974, became a hit on three U.S. charts for Campbell in June 1980, recorded as a duet with Rita Coolidge.

== Track listing ==
Side 1:

1. "Somethin' 'Bout You Baby I Like" (Richard Supa) – 2:45 - duet with Rita Coolidge
2. "Through My Eyes" (T. J. Kuenster) – 3:42
3. "That Kind" (Neil Diamond, Carole Bayer Sager) – 3:13
4. "Part Time Love" (David Gates) – 2:33
5. "Hollywood Smiles" (Larry Weiss) – 3:17

Side 2:

1. "If This Is Love" (Kerry Chater, Robbie Patton) – 4:01
2. "Hooked On Love" (Ian Gomm) – 2:06
3. "Show Me You Love Me" (Micheal Smotherman) – 3:08 - duet with Rita Coolidge
4. "Late Night Confession" (Gary Portnoy, Jay Davidson) – 3:35
5. "It Goes Like It Goes" (David Shire, Norman Gimbel) – 3:40

== Personnel ==
- Glen Campbell – vocals, acoustic and electric guitars, backing vocals
- Steve Turner – drums
- Neil Stubenhaus – bass guitar
- Dean Parks – acoustic guitars and electric guitars
- Jai Winding – keyboards, clavinet, organ, electric piano
- Jeff Baxter – electric guitars; vocoder on "That Kind"; pedal steel guitar on "Show Me You Love Me"; organ on "Hooked On Love"
- T.J. Kuenster – acoustic piano on "Show Me You Love Me" and "It Goes Like It Goes"
- Catherine Gotthoffer – harp on "Through My Eyes", "Part Time Love" and "If This Is Love"
- Alan Estes - percussion on "Hollywood Smiles"
- Nick DeCaro - vocoder on "If This Is Love"
- Tanya Tucker - backing vocals on "Hollywood Smiles" and "If This Is Love"
- Tom Saviano, Dick Hyde, David Boruff, Steve Madaio, Pete Christlieb, Warren Luening, Vincent DeRosa, Art Maebe, Lew McCreary, Lloyd Ulyate - horns
- Tom Saviano, Nick DeCaro, Lee Holdridge - arrangements
- Harry Bluestone, Sid Sharp - concertmaster

== Production ==
- Gary Klein - producer
- Charles Koppelman - executive producer
- Frank DeCaro - musical contractor
- John Arrias - recording, mixing
- Sheridan Eldridge - recording
- Roy Kohara - art direction
- Jim McCrary - photography

== Charts ==
Singles – Billboard (United States)

Year	Single	Hot Country Singles	Hot 100	Adult Contemporary
1980	"Somethin' 'Bout You Baby I Like" (w/ Rita Coolidge)	60	42	39
1980	"Hollywood Smiles"	80	—	—
