= Extinction Level Event: The Final World Front =

Studio album by Busta Rhymes
- Released: December 15, 1998
- Recorded: 1998
- Studios: Soundtrack Studios, New York City; Quad Studios, New York City; Larrabee North Sound Studios, Los Angeles, California; No Limit Studios, Baton Rouge, Louisiana; House of Blues Studios, Memphis, Tennessee
- Genre: Hip hop
- Length: 70:28
- Labels: Flipmode; Violator; Elektra
- Producers: Armando Colon; Busta Rhymes; Darrell "Delite" Allamby; Deric Angelettie; Diamond D; DJ Mr. Stanneke; DJ Scratch; Hassan Big Haas the Fantom; Jamal; Kenny "Flav" Dickerson; Nottz; Nasheim Myrick; Rashad Smith; Rockwilder; Swizz Beatz

Busta Rhymes chronology
| The Imperial (1998) | Extinction Level Event: The Final World Front (1998) | Anarchy (2000) |

Busta Rhymes solo chronology
| When Disaster Strikes... (1997) | Extinction Level Event: The Final World Front (1998) | Anarchy (2000) |

Singles from E.L.E. (Extinction Level Event): The Final World Front
- 1. "Gimme Some More" Released: October 26, 1998; 2. "Party Is Goin' on Over Here" Released: 1998; 3. "What's It Gonna Be?!" Released: March 9, 1999

Extinction Level Event: The Final World Front is the third studio album by American rapper and record producer Busta Rhymes. It was released on December 15, 1998, by Flipmode and Elektra Records in North America. The album follows the apocalyptic theme explored by Rhymes' first two albums, The Coming (1996) and When Disaster Strikes... (1997). The album comprises East Coast, West Coast, horrorcore, and hardcore hip hop music.

Widely praised by critics, the album earned three Grammy Award nominations: Best Rap Album, Best Rap Solo Performance and Best Rap Performance by a Duo or Group at the 42nd Grammy Awards. It also spawned three Billboard chart hits, including the Janet Jackson-featuring "What's It Gonna Be?!", which became Busta's highest-charting single on the US Billboard Hot 100 as a lead artist, reaching number three. In early 1999, E.L.E. was certified Platinum by the Recording Industry Association of America (RIAA) for selling over one million copies.

"I'd had success with two albums, and I felt like I didn't have to prove anything to other people anymore. But I had to prove something to myself. I did things that nobody had been able to do before, such as having Janet Jackson and Ozzy Osbourne on the same album. I caught [producer] J Dilla at the best time. Nobody else got him as good as me." – Busta Rhymes

== Reception ==
Professional ratings
Review scores
| Source | Rating |
|---|---|
| AllMusic | 4/5 stars |
| Christgau's Consumer Guide | (neither) |
| Entertainment Weekly | B |
| Mixmag | 4/5 stars |
| NME | 3.5/5 stars |
| RapReviews | 8/10 |
| Rolling Stone | 4/5 stars |
| The Rolling Stone Album Guide | 3.5/5 stars |
| The Source | 4/5 stars |
| Urban Latino | 4/4 stars |

The album received generally favorable reviews. At the 42nd Grammy Awards, the album earned three nominations, one for the album itself in the category of Best Rap Album, a Best Rap Solo Performance nomination for "Gimme Some More" and a Best Rap Performance by a Duo or Group nomination for "What's It Gonna Be?!" with Janet Jackson.

In August 2020, Busta Rhymes announced a sequel to the album, Extinction Level Event 2: The Wrath of God, which was released on October 30, 2020.

=== Commercial performance ===
The album debuted at number 12 on the official US Billboard 200 album chart, remaining on the chart for 32 weeks. E.L.E. peaked at the number two spot on the R&B/Hip-Hop Albums chart, peaking inside the top 50 for 35 weeks. In the United Kingdom, E.L.E. entered at number 54 on the UK Albums Chart, charting for seven weeks. On January 8, 1999, the album was certified Platinum by the Recording Industry Association of America (RIAA) for shipping 1,000,000 copies.

=== Album cover ===
The album, and cover were influenced by popular disaster movies around the time of the album's release in 1998, primarily Armageddon and Deep Impact. Busta Rhymes explained that the cover was inspired by the disaster movie Deep Impact, showing his image of an asteroid hitting New York City.

== Track listing ==
Credits adapted from the album's liner notes.

| No. | Title | Writer(s) | Producer(s) | Length |
|---|---|---|---|---|
| 1. | "There's Only One Year Left!!!" (Intro) | | DJ Mr. Stanneke | 2:39 |
| 2. | "Everybody Rise" | Trevor Smith; Dominick Lamb; David Camon | Nottz | 3:02 |
| 3. | "Where We Are About to Take It" | Smith; Lamb; Darryl Sloan; Dick Hyman | Nottz | 3:08 |
| 4. | "Extinction Level Event (The Song of Salvation)" | Smith; Lamb; Sloan; Eddie Seago; Mike Leander | Nottz | 3:36 |
| 5. | "Tear da Roof Off" | Smith; Kasseem Dean | Swizz Beatz | 3:38 |
| 6. | "Against All Odds" (featuring Flipmode Squad) | Smith; Jamal Phillips; Roger McNair; William Lewis; Rashia Fisher; Wayne Notise; Leroy Jones | Jamal | 4:20 |
| 7. | "Just Give It to Me Raw" | Smith; Dean | Swizz Beatz | 3:03 |
| 8. | "Do It to Death" | Smith; Dana Stinson | Rockwilder | 3:29 |
| 9. | "Keepin' It Tight" | Smith; Rashad Smith; Armando Colon; Manu Dibango | Rashad Smith; Armando Colon^{[a]} | 4:29 |
| 10. | "Gimme Some More" | Smith; George Spivey | DJ Scratch | 2:41 |
| 11. | "Iz They Wildin wit Us & Gettin' Rowdy wit Us" (featuring Mystikal) | Smith; Michael Tyler; Darrell Allamby; Kenny Dickerson | Darrell "Delite" Allamby; Kenny "Flav" Dickerson | 3:41 |
| 12. | "Party Is Goin' on Over Here" | Smith; Spivey | DJ Scratch | 2:34 |
| 13. | "Do the Bus a Bus" | Smith; Spivey; Russell Simmons; Jimmy Spicer; Lawrence Smith | DJ Scratch | 5:00 |
| 14. | "Take It Off" | Smith; Carlos Evans; August Darnell; Stony Browder Jr. | Hassan Big Haas the Fantom | 3:09 |
| 15. | "What's It Gonna Be?!" (featuring Janet Jackson) | Smith; Allamby; Antoinette Roberson | Darrell "Delite" Allamby | 5:26 |
| 16. | "Hot Shit Makin' Ya Bounce" | Smith; Deric Angelettie; Nasheim Myrick; Earl Randle; Willie Mitchell; Dougie Bryan | Deric Angelettie; Nasheim Myrick | 3:34 |
| 17. | "What the Fuck You Want!!" | Smith; Joseph Kirkland; Jerry Lordan | Diamond D | 3:17 |
| 18. | "This Means War!!" (featuring Ozzy Osbourne of Black Sabbath) | Smith; Ozzy Osbourne; Tony Iommi; Geezer Butler; William Ward; Adam McLeer; Joe Conoscenti; Eric Anderson; Adam Meyer | Busta Rhymes | 5:04 |
| 19. | "The Burial Song" (Outro) | Smith; Spivey | DJ Scratch | 5:04 |
| Total length: | | | | 70:28 |

=== Notes ===
- ^{^[a]} signifies a co-producer

== Charts ==
| Chart (1998) | Peak position |
|---|---|
| Canadian Albums (Billboard) | 34 |
| German Albums (Offizielle Top 100) | 45 |
| UK Albums (Official Charts) | 54 |
| UK R&B Albums (Official Charts) | 7 |
| US Billboard 200 | 12 |
| US Top R&B/Hip-Hop Albums (Billboard) | 2 |

=== Year-end charts ===
| Chart (1999) | Position |
|---|---|
| US Billboard 200 | 49 |
| US R&B/Hip-Hop Albums | 14 |

== Certifications ==
| Region | Certification | Certified units/sales |
|---|---|---|
| United Kingdom (BPI) | Gold | 100,000^{*} |
| United States (RIAA) | Platinum | 1,000,000^{^} |
^{*} Sales figures based on certification alone.^{^} Shipments figures based on certification alone.
