= The Ultimate Gift (album) =

Studio album by Rahsaan Patterson
- Released: August 26, 2008
- Recorded: 2007
- Genre: Christmas; R&B; soul; neo soul
- Length: 36:51
- Label: Artistry Music
- Producer: Jamey Jaz; Van Hunt; Rahsaan Patterson; Keith Crouch

Rahsaan Patterson chronology
Wines & Spirits (2007)	The Ultimate Gift (2008)	Bleuphoria (2011)

Professional ratings
Review scores
Source	Rating
Allmusic	4/5 stars

The Ultimate Gift is a Christmas album by American R&B/soul singer Rahsaan Patterson, his fifth studio album released under Artistry Music in 2008. Patterson and Jamey Jaz co-wrote and co-produced seven of the tracks, Van Hunt along with Patterson co-producing, "Christmas at My House".

== Track listing ==
No.	Title	Length
1.	"Holiday"	4:30
2.	"What Christmas Means to Me"	2:29
3.	"This Is the Season"	2:21
4.	"Peace and Joy"	4:20
5.	"That First Christmas"	3:24
6.	"Angels" (sing)	3:00
7.	"Little Drummer Boy"	3:28
8.	"Christmas at My House"	4:44
9.	"Wonderful Christmastime"	3:49
10.	"The Ultimate Gift"	4:24
11.	"Angels" (Reprise)	0:31

== Charts ==
Chart (2008)	Peak position
US Top R&B/Hip-Hop Albums (Billboard)	50
