= Stop By =

Single by Rahsaan Patterson

from the album Rahsaan Patterson
- Released: 1997
- Genre: R&B, pop
- Length: 5:50
- Label: MCA
- Songwriters: Rahsaan Patterson; Keith Crouch; Glenn McKinney; Roy Pennon
- Producer: Keith Crouch

Rahsaan Patterson singles chronology
"Stop By" (1997)	"Where You Are" (1997)

"Stop By" is a single released in 1997 by American Neo soul singer Rahsaan Patterson. The song is the lead single in support of his debut studio album, Rahsaan Patterson. "Stop By" failed to chart on Billboard's Hot R&B/Hip-Hop Songs, the song peaked at no.39 on Hot R&B Airplay. The song was also released as a single in the UK in July 1997.

== Track listing ==
UK CD" single

No.	Title	Length
1.	"Stop By" (Radio Edit)
2.	"Stop By" (Album Version)
3.	"Stop By" (Full Crew R&B Mix)
4.	"Stop By" (Full Crew R&B Edit)

== Charts ==
Chart	Peak position
UK Singles (OCC)	50
Billboard Hot R&B Airplay	39
