= Pool Kids =

American math rock band

- Origin: Florida, U.S.
- Genres: Math rock; emo; alternative rock
- Years active: 2017–present
- Labels: Skeletal Lightning; Big Scary Monsters; Epitaph Records
- Members: Christine Goodwyne; Caden Clinton; Andy Anaya; Nicolette Alvarez
- Website: poolkidsband.com

Pool Kids is an American math rock and emo band from Tallahassee, Florida. It consists of lead vocalist and multi-instrumentalist Christine Goodwyne, drummer Caden Clinton, guitarist Andy Anaya, and bassist Nicolette Alvarez. The band has released three studio albums, Music to Practice Safe Sex To (2018), Pool Kids (2022), and Easier Said Than Done (2025).

== History ==
Pool Kids formed in 2017. The following year, they released their debut studio album, Music to Practice Safe Sex To on July 13. The album went largely unnoticed until Paramore frontwoman Hayley Williams posted an Instagram Story about it, leading to the band receiving widespread recognition.

On February 5, 2020, Pool Kids released a music video for $5 Subtweet. On February 20, the band went on tour with the Wonder Years, but were forced abruptly to end the tour on March 13 due to the COVID-19 pandemic.

On May 24, 2022, Pool Kids released the single "That's Physics, Baby", and announced their second studio album, the self-titled Pool Kids, which was released on July 22, 2022.

On April 7, 2023, Pool Kids' self-titled album was released in Europe via Big Scary Monsters. Pool Kids supported La Dispute on their Spring 2023 Europe tour, in addition to their own headlining tour dates in the UK.

In June 2023, Pool Kids released the split EP Pool Kids // POOL with their own hardcore alter ego band, POOL. POOL was originally created as an April Fool's joke in 2019 with a 2 song release under the name.

The band's third studio album, Easier Said Than Done, was released on August 15, 2025, via Epitaph Records. They announced a North American tour to support the album. In Fall 2026, they opened for Death Cab for Cutie on their European tour.

== Discography ==
- Music to Practice Safe Sex To (2018)
- Pool Kids (2022)
- Pool Kids // POOL (2023)
- Easier Said Than Done (2025)
