= Music to Practice Safe Sex To =

Studio album by Pool Kids
- Released: July 13, 2018
- Genres: Emo; math rock
- Label: Skeletal Lightning
- Producer: Len Beshiri (credited as engineer)

Pool Kids chronology
Music to Practice Safe Sex To (2018)	Pool Kids (2022)

Music to Practice Safe Sex To is the debut studio album by American rock band Pool Kids. It was released on July 13, 2018 by Skeletal Lightning.

== Style ==
Music is mainly aligned with emo and math rock, with "atmospheric" alternative rock and "upbeat" power pop included as well.

== Critical reception ==
Upon release in 2018, Music evaded critical attention. The following year, Paramore's Hayley Williams expressed admiration for it on Instagram, bringing the band newfound notice.

Retrospectively, Music is recognized for placing Pool Kids "well and truly on the map" and at fifth-wave emo's forefront. In 2021, Bandcamp Daily listed it amongst eight essential albums of the wave. In 2025, Paste's Grant Sharples called it "a charming, concise package that distilled their live-wire math-rock tendencies into a relatively breezy listening experience".

== Track listing ==
No.	Title	Length
1.	"Overly Verbose Email Series pt. III"	3:08
2.	"Borderline"	5:13
3.	"Erso"	4:59
4.	"$5 Subtweet"	2:22
5.	"They Only Care About My Fills And Not My Feels"	3:05
6.	"Five-Time 2nd Place Winner"	2:58
7.	"I Know It's Only Fair"	4:35
8.	"Patterns"	3:41
9.	"Rick's Toy Box"	3:57

== Personnel ==
Credits from Bandcamp.

Pool Kids

- Christine Goodwyne – vocals, guitars, bass
- Caden Clinton – drums

Technical

- Lon Beshiri – engineering, mixing, mastering

Artwork and design

- Olivia Tinnin – album art
