= Stop Breaking My Heart =

Single by Rahsaan Patterson

from the album Wines & Spirits
- Released: August 28, 2007
- Recorded: 2006
- Genre: R&B
- Length: 5:12
- Label: Artistry Music
- Songwriter(s): Rahsaan Patterson; Audius Mtawaira
- Producer(s): Rahsaan Patterson

Rahsaan Patterson singles chronology
"Forever Yours" (2004)	"Stop Breaking My Heart" (2007)	"Feels Good" (2008)

"Stop Breaking My Heart" is a song by American R&B/soul singer Rahsaan Patterson, released in 2007. The song is the lead single in support of his album, Wines & Spirits.
The song peaked at No.59 on Billboard's Hot R&B/Hip-Hop Songs chart.

== Track listing ==
US digital single

No.	Title	Length
1.	"Stop Breaking My Heart" (Album Edit)

== Charts ==
Chart 2007	Peak position
Billboard Hot R&B/Hip-Hop Songs	59
