= Highwayman (Glen Campbell album) =

Studio album by Glen Campbell
- Released: October 1979
- Recorded: 1979
- Studio: Lagniappe (Sherman Oaks, California); Broad Recording (Honolulu, Hawaii); Capitol (Hollywood)
- Genre: Country
- Label: Capitol
- Producer: Glen Campbell, Tom Thacker

Glen Campbell chronology
Basic (1978)	Highwayman (1979)	Somethin' 'Bout You Baby I Like (1980)

Highwayman is the thirty-fifth studio album by American singer/guitarist Glen Campbell, released in 1979 (see 1979 in music).

== Track listing ==
Side 1:

1. "Highwayman" (Jimmy Webb) – 3:01
2. "Hound Dog Man" (Tommy Stuart) – 2:39
3. "I Was Just Thinking About You" (Micheal Smotherman) – 2:40
4. "Love Song" (Webb) – 3:15
5. "My Prayer" (Smotherman) – 2:37

Side 2:

1. "Tennessee Home" (Smotherman) – 3:10
2. "Don't Lose Me in the Confusion" (T.J. Kuenster) – 3:13
3. "Cajun Caper" (Smotherman) – 3:52
4. "Darlin' Darlinka" (Smotherman) – 3:16
5. "Fool Ya" (Smotherman) – 2:17

== Personnel ==
- Glen Campbell – vocals, acoustic guitars, electric guitars, bass guitars
- Craig Fall – acoustic guitar, backing vocals
- Ed Greene – drums
- Carl Jackson – acoustic guitar, fiddle, banjo, backing vocals
- TJ Kuenster – keyboards, backing vocals
- Bill McCubbin – bass guitar, backing vocals
- Steve Turner – drums, backing vocals
- Doug Kershaw – fiddle solo on "Cajun Caper"
- Tom Kellock – piano on "Hound Dog Man"
- Jimmy Webb – piano on "Love Song"
- Micheal Smotherman, Dan Kuenster, Laura Turner, Steve Crossley, Kathy Smotherman, Jo Dell Smotherman, Darlene Groncki - additional backing vocals

== Production ==
- Producer – Glen Campbell, Tom Thacker
- "Highwayman", "Hound Dog Man", "Love Song", "Darlin' Darlinka", "Fool Ya" recorded at Lagniappe, Sherman Oaks, California
- "I Was Just Thinkin About You", "Tennessee", "Don't Lose Me in the Confusion", "Cajun Caper" recorded at Broad Recording Studios, Honolulu, Hawaii
- "My Prayer" recorded at Capitol Records, Hollywood, California
- Arranged by Jimmy Webb, TJ Kuenster
- Strings conductor – Sid Sharp, Irving Geller

== Charts ==
Singles – Billboard (United States)

Year	Single	Hot Country Singles	Hot 100	Easy Listening
1979	"Hound Dog Man"	25	-	-
1979	"My Prayer"	66	-	42
