= Party Is Goin' on Over Here =

1998 single by Busta Rhymes

Single by Busta Rhymes

from the album Extinction Level Event: The Final World Front
- B-side: "Everybody Rise"; "Tear da Roof Off"
- Released: late 1998
- Recorded: 1998
- Studio: Soundtrack Studios, New York City
- Genre: Hip hop
- Length: 2:34
- Label: Flipmode; Elektra
- Songwriters: Trevor Smith; George Spivey
- Producer: DJ Scratch

Busta Rhymes singles chronology
"Gimme Some More" (1998)	"Party Is Goin' on Over Here" (1998)	"Da Goodness" (1999)

Music video
- "Gimme Some More" on YouTube

"Party Is Goin' on Over Here" is a song by American rapper Busta Rhymes. It was released as the third single from his third studio album Extinction Level Event: The Final World Front in late 1998, by Flipmode Entertainment and Elektra Records. The song was written by Rhymes and its producer DJ Scratch, who worked with Rhymes several times, including on the album's first single, "Gimme Some More". The song was released with the songs "Everybody Rise" and "Tear da Roof Off", both appearing on Extinction Level Event: The Final World Front and the latter released as the lead single from the album, as its B-side. It peaked at number 72 on the US Hot R&B/Hip-Hop Songs chart.

== Composition ==
"Party Is Goin' on Over Here" was composed in 4/4 time and the key of A minor, with a tempo of 68 beats per minute. It has a duration time of two minutes and thirty-four seconds.

== Music video ==
The music video for "Party Is Goin' on Over Here", directed by Hype Williams, was released as a two-part music video in 1999, with the first half consisting of the lead single from Extinction Level Event: The Final World Front, "Tear da Roof Off", and the second half consisting of "Party Is Goin' on Over Here".

== Track listing ==
Side A
No.	Title	Writer(s)	Producer(s)	Length
1.	"Party Is Goin' on Over Here" (clean)	Trevor Smith; George Spivey	DJ Scratch	2:48
2.	"Party Is Goin' on Over Here" (dirty)	Smith; Spivey	DJ Scratch	2:48
3.	"Party Is Goin' on Over Here" (instrumental)		DJ Scratch	3:17

Side B
No.	Title	Writer(s)	Producer(s)	Length
1.	"Everybody Rise" (clean)	Smith; Dominick Lamb; David Camon	Nottz	2:59
2.	"Tear da Roof Off" (clean)	Smith; Kasseem Dean	Swizz Beatz	3:36
3.	"Tear da Roof Off" (dirty)	Smith; Dean	Swizz Beatz	3:36
Total length:				19:04

== Charts ==
Chart (1999)	Peak position
US Hot R&B/Hip-Hop Songs (Billboard)	72
