= Da Goodness =

1999 single by Redman

Single by Redman

from the album Doc's da Name 2000
- B-side: "I Don't Kare"
- Released: January 12, 1999
- Genre: Hip-hop
- Length: 4:09
- Label: Def Jam
- Songwriters: Reggie Noble; Trevor Smith; Duke Ellington; Irving Mills; Juan Tizol
- Producer: Redman

Redman singles chronology
"I'll Bee Dat!" (1998)	"Da Goodness" (1999)	"Let Da Monkey Out" (1999)

Busta Rhymes singles chronology
"Party Is Goin' on Over Here" (1998)	"Da Goodness" (1999)	"What's It Gonna Be?!" (1999)

Music video
- "Da Goodness" on YouTube

"Da Goodness" is a song by American rapper Redman with a verse by fellow rapper Busta Rhymes. It was released on January 12, 1999, via Def Jam Recordings as the second single from Redman's fourth solo studio album, Doc's da Name 2000. Production was handled by Redman himself, who used an interpolation of "Caravan" written by Duke Ellington, Juan Tizol, and Irving Mills.

The song did not reach the US Billboard Hot 100, however, it made it to number 50 on the Hot R&B/Hip-Hop Songs, number 38 on the R&B/Hip-Hop Airplay, and number 9 on the Hot Rap Songs in the United States. In the UK, the song was more successful, peaking at number 52 on the UK Singles Chart and number 5 on both the UK Dance and UK Hip Hop/R&B charts. A music video was directed by Steve Carr; the video and a radio edit omitted Busta Rhymes's verse.

== Composition ==
"Da Goodness" was composed in 4/4 time and the key of F♯ major, with a tempo of 67 beats per minute. It has a duration time of four minutes and nine seconds.

== Track listing ==
No.	Title	Writer(s)	Producer(s)	Length
1.	"Da Goodness" (Radio Edit)	Reginald Noble; Trevor Smith; Duke Ellington; Juan Tizol; Irving Mills	Redman
2.	"Da Goodness (LP Version)" (with Busta Rhymes)	Noble; Smith; Ellington; Tizol; Mills	Redman
3.	"Da Goodness" (Instrumental)	Noble; Smith; Ellington; Tizol; Mills	Redman
4.	"I Don't Kare" (Radio Edit)	Noble; Erick Sermon; Victor Santiago; Pharrell Williams; Chad Hugo; Kirk Robinson; Nat Robinson; Deborah Harry; Chris Stein	Erick Sermon; Redman (co.)
5.	"I Don't Kare" (LP Version)	Noble; Sermon; Santiago; Williams; Hugo; K. Robinson; N. Robinson; Harry; Stein	Erick Sermon; Redman (co.)
6.	"I Don't Kare" (Instrumental)	Noble; Sermon; Santiago; Williams; Hugo; K. Robinson; N. Robinson; Harry; Stein	Erick Sermon; Redman (co.)

== Charts ==
Chart (1999)	Peak position
UK Singles (Official Charts)	52
UK Dance (Official Charts)	5
UK Hip Hop/R&B (Official Charts)	5
US Hot R&B/Hip-Hop Songs (Billboard)	50
US R&B/Hip-Hop Airplay (Billboard)	38
US Hot Rap Songs (Billboard)	9
