= Heroes & Gods =

Studio album by Rahsaan Patterson
- Released: May 17, 2019
- Length: 55:35
- Label: Shanachie
- Producer: Jamey Jaz; Davel McKenzie; Jairus Mozee; Rahsaan Patterson; Derrick "D-Loc" Walker

Rahsaan Patterson chronology
Bleuphoria (2011)	Heroes & Gods (2019)

Heroes & Gods is the seventh studio album by American singer Rahsaan Patterson. It was released by Shanachie Records on May 17, 2019. Patterson's debut with the label as well as his first album in eight years, Heroes & Gods debuted and peaked at number 29 on the US Independent Albums chart.

== Critical reception ==
Professional ratings
Review scores
Source	Rating
AllMusic	4/5 stars

AllMusic editor Andy Kellman wrote that "like his two most recent albums, Bleuphoria and Wines & Spirits, it communicates many emotions relating to intimacy and continually switches up sounds, like a lovingly personalized 60-minute mixtape that prioritizes quality over flow [...] Patterson references bygone eras crossing several decades while twisting contemporary sounds, grounded as ever in gospel and soul, and throws in a couple of stylistic curveballs. The idiosyncratic set is out of time and modern at once."

== Track listing ==
No.	Title	Writer(s)	Producer(s)	Length
1.	"Catch Me When I Fall"	Rahsaan Patterson	Patterson	3:40
2.	"Wonderful Star"	Derrick Walker; Jairus Mozee; Patterson	Walker; Mozee; Patterson	5:29
3.	"Silly. Love. Fool"	Patterson	Jamey Jaz; Patterson	3:55
4.	"Rock and Roll"	LaToiya Williams; Trina Broussard; Patterson	Patterson	5:18
5.	"Break It Down"	Craig Brockman; Joi Gilliam; Rachelle Ferrell; Patterson	Walker; Mozee; Patterson	3:58
6.	"Don't You Know That"	Luther Vandross	Mozee; Patterson	3:07
7.	"Sent From Heaven"	Brockman; Patterson	Walker; Mozee; Patterson	3:59
8.	"Wide Awake"	Walker; Patterson	Patterson	4:13
9.	"Soldier"	A. Richards; Jaz; Patterson	Jaz; Patterson	3:38
10.	"Oxford Blues"	Jaz; Patterson	Jaz; Patterson	3:33
11.	"Sweet Memories"	Davel McKenzie; Patterson	McKenzie; Patterson	5:02
12.	"I Try"	Patterson	Jaz; Patterson	5:07
13.	"Heroes and Gods"	Patterson	Jaz; Patterson	4:36

== Charts ==
Chart (2019)	Peak position
US Independent Albums (Billboard)	29

== Release history ==
Heroes & Gods release history
Region	Date	Format	Label	Ref(s)
Variouss	May 17, 2019	CD; digital download; streaming	Shanachie	
