= It's the World Gone Crazy =

Studio album by Glen Campbell
- Released: January 1981
- Recorded: 1980
- Studio: Sound Labs Inc., Hollywood
- Genre: Country
- Label: Capitol
- Producer: Gary Klein, Snuff Garrett

Glen Campbell chronology
| Somethin' 'Bout You Baby I Like (1980) | It's the World Gone Crazy (1981) | Glen Campbell Live (1981) |

It's the World Gone Crazy is the thirty-seventh album by American singer/guitarist Glen Campbell, released in 1981 (see 1981 in music). The lead single, "Any Which Way You Can", was the title song to the 1980 movie Any Which Way You Can, the sequel to Every Which Way But Loose.

== Track listing ==
Side 1:

1. "Why Don't We Just Sleep on It Tonight" (duet with Tanya Tucker) (John Lewis Parker, Harry Shannon) – 3:05
2. "I Don't Want to Know Your Name" (Micheal Smotherman) – 4:02
3. "In Cars" (Jimmy Webb) – 3:05
4. "It's the World's Gone Crazy (Cotillion)" (Shel Silverstein, Waylon Jennings) – 2:38
5. "Rollin'" (Joe Rainey, Jack Tempchin) – 3:30

Side 2:

1. "Nothing Quite Like Love" (Micheal Smotherman) – 3:57
2. "A Daisy a Day" (Jud Strunk) – 3:40
3. "Any Which Way You Can" (Milton Brown, Steve Dorff, Snuff Garrett) – 3:14
4. "It's Your World" (Joe Rainey) – 3:46
5. "Shoulder to Shoulder" (duet with Tanya Tucker) (Henry Gaffney) – 3:25

== Personnel ==
- Glen Campbell – vocals, acoustic guitars, electric guitars
- Tanya Tucker – vocals
- David Foster – piano
- Larry Muhoberac – piano
- T.J. Kuenster – keyboards
- Micheal Smotherman – Wurlitzer piano
- Joe Rainey – Hammond B-3 organ, harmonica
- Larry Byrom – guitar
- Fred Tackett – guitar
- Billy Joe Walker Jr. – guitar
- Craig Fall – acoustic guitar, electric guitar, steel guitar
- Jay Dee Maness – steel guitar (track 8)
- Bill McCubbin – bass guitar
- Steve Turner – drums
- Nick DeCaro – accordion
- Tom Saviano – saxophone (track 2)

== Production ==
- Executive Producer – Charles Koppelman
- Producers – Gary Klein for The Entertainment Company, Snuff Garrett ("Any Which Way You Can")
- Strings – Nick DeCaro, Steve Dorff
- Conductor – Edward Karam
- Concertmaster – Harry Bluestone
- Engineers – John Arrias, Grover Helsley
- Photography – Mike Rothwell

== Chart performance ==
=== Album ===
| Chart (1981) | Peak position |
|---|---|
| U.S. Billboard Top Country Albums | 49 |
| U.S. Billboard 200 | 178 |

=== Singles ===
| Year | Single | Peak chart positions | | | |
| Year | Single | US Country | US | US AC | CAN Country |
|---|---|---|---|---|---|
| 1980 | "Any Which Way You Can" | 10 | — | — | 10 |
| 1981 | "I Don't Want to Know Your Name" | 54 | 65 | 45 | — |
| 1981 | "Why Don't We Just Sleep on It Tonight" (with Tanya Tucker) | 85 | — | — | — |
