= After Hours (Rahsaan Patterson album) =

Studio album by Rahsaan Patterson
- Released: October 26, 2004
- Length: 50:15
- Labels: Artistry Music; Dome
- Producers: Mike City; Jamey Jaz; Van Hunt; Steve "Silk" Hurley; Rahsaan Patterson; John "Jubu" Smith; Derek "D'Loc" Walker

Rahsaan Patterson chronology
Love in Stereo (1999)	After Hours (2004)	Wines & Spirits (2007)

After Hours is the third studio album by American neo-soul artist Rahsaan Patterson, released on October 26, 2004, under Artistry Music. The album is his first independent release on the record label. The album debuted at #65 on Billboard's Top R&B/Hip-Hop Albums chart. In 2003, he released the song "The One for Me", which originally appeared on the 2002 Steve Harvey compilation album Sign of Things to Come: Steve's Pick of the Year. The singles "April's Kiss," "So Hot," and "Forever Yours" received heavy rotation airplay on radio, but failed to chart on Billboards singles chart. Production for the album includes Patterson, Jamey Jaz, Van Hunt, and Steve "Silk" Hurley as his core writing and production team, along with members of his band, John "Jubu" Smith, Keith Crouch, background vocalists Trina Broussard and RaRe Valverde.

== Critical reception ==
Professional ratings
Review scores
Source	Rating
AllMusic	4.5/5 stars

AllMusic editor Andy Kellman called the album Patterson's "finest yet" as well as "one of the most satisfying R&B releases of 2004." He added: "After Hours benefits from a touch so easy and natural that it practically sounds like it was made by a new artist. Throughout, you can picture Patterson surrounded by a small group, cutting most of the material live in the studio. This is the proper route for him [...] as opposed to dozens upon dozens of session musicians, producers, and engineers. Even the up-tempo party songs [...] have little varnish applied, and are a lot more suited for backyard gatherings than the clothing boutique in the mall."

== Track listing ==
UK edition
No.	Title	Writer(s)	Producer(s)	Length
1.	"The One for Me"	Jack King III; Devory Pugh	Pugh; King III	3:25
2.	"I Always Find Myself"	Rahsaan Patterson; Booker T. Jones; Derrick Walker; John Smith	Patterson; Jones; Walker; Smith	4:29
3.	"So Hot"	Patterson; Jamey Jaz; Mikelyn Roderick	Jaz; Patterson	5:17
4.	"Burnin'"	Patterson; Van Hunt	Patterson; Hunt	4:47
5.	"Loving You"	Patterson; Hunt	Patterson; Hunt	4:31
6.	"The Best"	Patterson; Hunt	Patterson; Hunt	4:03
7.	"Don't Run So Fast"	Patterson; Jaz	Jaz; Patterson	5:09
8.	"You Make Life So Good"	Patterson; Devel McKenzie	McKenzie; Patterson	5:24
9.	"Yeah Yeah Yeah"	Patterson; Steve Hurley	Patterson; Hurley	4:53
10.	"Separate"	Patterson; Hunt	Patterson; Hunt	4:24
11.	"April's Kiss"	Patterson; Smith; Walker	Patterson; Smith; Walker; Jones III	5:10
Total length:				50:15

US edition
No.	Title	Writer(s)	Producer(s)	Length
12.	"Forever Yours"	Mike City	City	4:12
13.	"Sometimes (You Gotta Let Go)"	Patterson; Jaz	Jaz; Patterson	4:10
14.	"After Hours (Gone Is the Love)"	Patterson; RaRe Valverde; David Foreman; Walker; Trina Broussard	Patterson; Jones III; Walker	2:30
Total length:				62:24

== Credits ==
Credits adapted from the liner notes of After Hours.

- Lead Vocals, Backing Vocals, Executive Producer, Art Direction – Rahsaan Patterson
- Backing Vocals – Lua Crofts, Mikelyn Roderick, RaRe Valverde, Sheree Ford, Trina Broussard
- Bass – Eric Smith, Kevin Wyatt
- Bass, Guitar – John "Jubu" Smith
- Engineer [Assistant] – Jason Vesclo, Joaquin Fernandez
- Guitar – Tim Pierce, Tony Maiden
- Instrumentation By – Devel McKenzie, Julliann French Orchestra
- Instrumentation By, Backing Vocals – Van Hunt
- Instrumentation By, Programmed By – Devory Pugh, Jack King III
- Keyboards, Drum Programming, Recorded By – Steve "Silk" Hurley
- Keyboards, Drums, Percussion – Derrick Walker
- Mastered By – Gene Grimaldi
- Mixed By – John Van Nest, Kevin Crouse, Manny Marroquin, Serban Ghenea, Tony Maserati
- Percussion – Michael Fisher
- Recorded By – Anthony Jeffries, Chris James, Kevin Freeman, Ryan West, Sprague Williams, Tim Dudfield, Todd Yeager
- Recorded By [Vocals], Recorded By – Kevin Guarnieri
- Recorded By, Mixed By – Booker T. Jones III
- Recorded By, Mixed By, Keyboards, Bass, Acoustic Guitar, Electric Piano [Fender Rhodes] – Jamey Jaz

== Charts ==
Chart (2004)	Peak position
US Top R&B/Hip-Hop Albums (Billboard)	65
