= Tear da Roof Off =

1998 single by Busta Rhymes

Promotional single by Busta Rhymes

from the album Extinction Level Event: The Final World Front
- A-side: "Gimme Some More"; "Party Is Goin' on Over Here"; "What's It Gonna Be?!"
- Released: October 21, 1998
- Recorded: 1998
- Studio: Soundtrack Studios (New York City); Larrabee North Sound Studios (Los Angeles)
- Genre: Hip hop
- Length: 3:38
- Label: Flipmode; Elektra
- Songwriters: Trevor Smith; Kasseem Dean
- Producer: Swizz Beatz

Busta Rhymes chronology
"There's No Problem My Squad Can't Fix" (1998)	"Tear da Roof Off" (1998)	"Do It Like Never Before" (1998)

"Tear da Roof Off" is a song by American rapper Busta Rhymes. It was released as the first promotional single from his third studio album Extinction Level Event: The Final World Front on October 21, 1998, by Flipmode Entertainment and Elektra Records. The song was written by Rhymes and its producer Swizz Beatz. The song was released with the second single from the album "Gimme Some More" as its A-side. It was also included as the B-side on the second single release, "What's It Gonna Be?!" featuring Janet Jackson, and on the third single release of the album, "Party Is Goin' on Over Here". The song peaked at number 75 on the US Hot R&B/Hip-Hop Songs chart.

== Composition ==
"Tear da Roof Off" was composed in 4/4 time and the key of B♭ minor, with a tempo of 179 beats per minute. It has a duration time of three minutes and thirty-eight seconds.

== Music video ==
The music video for "Tear da Roof Off", directed by Hype Williams, was filmed as a two-part music video, with the first half consisting of "Tear da Roof Off" and the second half consisting of the fourth single from Extinction Level Event: The Final World Front, "Party Is Goin' on Over Here".

== Charts ==
Chart (1999)	Peak position
US Hot R&B/Hip-Hop Songs (Billboard)	75
