= Gimme Some More =

1998 single by Busta Rhymes

Single by Busta Rhymes

from the album Extinction Level Event: The Final World Front
- A-side: "Tear da Roof Off"
- B-side: "Do It Like Never Before"
- Released: October 26, 1998
- Recorded: 1998
- Studio: Soundtrack Studios, New York City
- Genre: Hardcore hip-hop
- Length: 2:39
- Label: Flipmode; Elektra
- Songwriters: Trevor Smith; George Spivey
- Producer: DJ Scratch

Busta Rhymes singles chronology
"Tear da Roof Off" (1998)	"Gimme Some More" (1998)	"Party Is Goin' on Over Here" (1998)

Music video
- "Gimme Some More" on YouTube

"Gimme Some More" is a song by American rapper Busta Rhymes. It was released as the second single from his third studio album Extinction Level Event: The Final World Front on October 26, 1998, by Flipmode Entertainment and Elektra Records. The song was written by Rhymes and produced by DJ Scratch. The violin riffs that accompany the main beat are sampled from the opening theme to Alfred Hitchcock's 1960 film Psycho, composed by Bernard Herrmann. It is often considered to be the very summit of Busta's complex, breathless, high-speed rhyming delivery, which was most prominent in his early work.

In 2000, it was nominated for Best Rap Solo Performance at the Grammy Awards, but it lost to Eminem's "My Name Is". Rhymes first performed the song live with The Roots on Saturday Night Live with "Tear da Roof Off" on February 13, 1999. He also performed the song live in 1999 at MTV Spring Break, the 1999 Soul Train Music Awards, at the Knitting Factory Brooklyn, New York in 2008, and at The Brooklyn Hip-Hop Festival in 2012.

== Composition ==
"Gimme Some More" was composed in 4/4 time and the key of B minor, with a tempo of 137 beats per minute. It has a duration of two minutes and thirty-nine seconds.

== Music video ==
The music video for "Gimme Some More" was directed by Hype Williams along with Busta Rhymes himself, credited there as Busta Remo. Like many of Busta's earlier music videos, it is shot through fisheye lens in fast motion and is largely absurdist in nature. Opening up with a Looney Tunes-like intro, the video begins with Busta Rhymes narrating in the background, recalling how he once bumped his head as a child. A little boy portraying Busta as a child acts this out. A woman runs out of house to the aid of him. Suddenly, the child turns into a hideous, little blue monster with big yellow eyes and sharp teeth, and chases the woman around and throughout the house. The story is intercut with scenes of Busta Rhymes and other members of Flipmode Squad in various random costumes and situations. Busta is seen as a boxer, stock broker, police officer, miner, pistol-toting, Yosemite Sam-like Texan, body builder, pimp and a person tied up about to get run over by a train a la The Perils of Pauline. The video ends on an unresolved cliffhanger, with the woman trapped on top of a refrigerator and the monster climbing closer and closer towards her.

It was nominated for Breakthrough Video at the 1999 MTV Video Music Awards. A VHS tape of the music video came free with a purchase of the album E.L.E. (Extinction Level Event): The Final World Front.

== Track listing ==
=== CD single ===
1. "Gimme Some More" (clean version)
2. "Gimme Some More" (dirty version)
3. "Do It Like Never Before"

== Charts ==
=== Weekly charts ===
Chart (1999)	Peak position
Germany (GfK)	52
Netherlands (Dutch Top 40)	15
Netherlands (Single Top 100)	19
New Zealand (Recorded Music NZ)	14
Scotland Singles (Official Charts)	14
Sweden (Sverigetopplistan)	50
UK Singles (Official Charts)	5
UK Dance (Official Charts)	3
UK Hip Hop/R&B (Official Charts)	2
US Hot R&B/Hip-Hop Songs (Billboard)	29
US Bubbling Under Hot 100 (Billboard)	5
US Rhythmic Airplay (Billboard)	36

=== Year-end charts ===
1998 year-end chart performance for "Gimme Some More"
Chart (1998)	Position
UK Urban (Music Week)	33

1999 year-end chart performance for "Take Me There"
Chart (1999)	Position
Netherlands (Dutch Top 40)	143

== Certifications ==
Region	Certification	Certified units/sales
United Kingdom (BPI)	Silver	200,000^{‡}
^{‡} Sales+streaming figures based on certification alone.
