= 1999 MTV Video Music Awards =

Award ceremony

- Date: Thursday, September 9, 1999
- Location: Metropolitan Opera House, New York City
- Country: United States
- Hosted by: Chris Rock

Highlights
- Most awards: Lauryn Hill (4)
- Most nominations: Ricky Martin and Korn (9 each)
- Website: http://www.mtv.com/vma/1999/

Television/radio coverage
- Network: MTV
- Produced by: Salli Frattini; Dave Sirulnick
- Directed by: Beth McCarthy; Seher Bedi

The 1999 MTV Video Music Awards, which took place on September 9, 1999 (informally known as the 9/9/99 MTV Video Music Awards), honored the best music videos released between June 13, 1998, and June 11, 1999. The ceremony was hosted by Chris Rock and held at the Metropolitan Opera House in New York City. Lauryn Hill was the biggest winner of the night, earning four awards, including the prestigious Video of the Year for "Doo Wop (That Thing)", making it the first hip-hop video to win in that category. Ricky Martin won two competitive awards for "Livin’ la Vida Loca": Best Pop Video and Best Dance Video. In addition, he received three International Viewer's Choice Awards, which were presented at the ceremony. Other notable winners included Korn, TLC, and Eminem.

Highlights of the show included Diana Ross jiggling Lil' Kim's exposed breast in response to her outfit, which left her entire left breast uncovered, but for a small pastie on her nipple. The mothers of slain rappers Tupac Shakur and The Notorious B.I.G., Afeni Shakur and Voletta Wallace, came together to present the Best Rap Video Award. The Beastie Boys' Adam Horovitz made a plea for peace in the wake of the sexual assaults at Woodstock '99. Near the end of the night, MTV staged a tribute to Madonna, the most-nominated artist in VMA history, by presenting a host of male drag performers dressed as the singer in her past music videos. Rapper DMX was scheduled to perform but was a no-show; as a result, Jay-Z's solo set was extended. Another moment of the ceremony was the debut of Britney Spears performing her debut single "...Baby One More Time", and then, NSYNC, performed their song "Tearin' Up My Heart".

As Backstreet Boys came up and accepted their award for Viewer's Choice, a stranger came onto the stage and said, "Wake up at 3". This person was later revealed to be John Del Signore, who crashed the ceremony in a failed attempt to sell Viacom a show idea.

The awards show featured a line-up of sponsors and cross-promotions, most notably with SEGA, as the date of the show also coincided with the launch of their Dreamcast game console in North America.

== Background ==
After scouting locations in both New York and Los Angeles, MTV announced in May that the 1999 MTV Video Music Awards would be held at New York's Metropolitan Opera House at Lincoln Center. (MTV's traditional New York venue, Radio City Music Hall, was closed for renovations at the time.) Comedian Chris Rock was announced as the ceremony's host on June 30. Nominations were announced at a press conference hosted by Rock, Carson Daly, and Ricky Martin and held at Lincoln Center on July 28. For the first time, the ceremony was promoted with a "VMA Week" on Total Request Live, which would continue annually until that program's cancellation in 2008. The ceremony broadcast was preceded by the 1999 MTV Video Music Awards Opening Act. Hosted by Kurt Loder and Serena Altschul with reports from Chris Connelly, Carson Daly, Ananda Lewis, and John Norris, the broadcast featured red carpet interviews, a pre-taped interview with Trent Reznor, pre-taped features on Britney Spears' outfit selection and testing various singers' vocal ability to shatter glass, and performances from Smash Mouth and Blink-182.

== Performances ==
=== Main show ===
List of musical performances
| Artist(s) | Song(s) |
Pre-show
| Smash Mouth | "All Star" |
| Blink-182 | "What's My Age Again?" "All the Small Things" |
Main show
| Kid Rock; Run-DMC; Steven Tyler; Joe Perry; Joe C. | "King of Rock" "Rock Box" "Bawitdaba" "Walk This Way" |
| Lauryn Hill | "Lost Ones" "Everything Is Everything" |
| Backstreet Boys | "I Want It That Way" "Larger Than Life" |
| Ricky Martin | "She's All I Ever Had" "Livin' la Vida Loca" |
| Nine Inch Nails | "The Fragile" |
| TLC | "No Scrubs" |
| Fatboy Slim | "Praise You" |
| Jay-Z; DJ Clue; Amil | "Jigga My Nigga" "Can I Get A..." "Hard Knock Life (Ghetto Anthem)" |
| Britney Spears; NSYNC | "...Baby One More Time" "Tearin' Up My Heart" |
| Eminem; Dr. Dre; Snoop Dogg | "My Name Is" "Guilty Conscience" "Nuthin' But a "G" Thang" |

== Presenters ==
=== Pre-show ===
- Chris Connelly and Ananda Lewis – announced the winners of the professional categories and presented Best R&B Video.

=== Main show ===
- Moby – DJed during the commercial breaks
- Janet Jackson – presented Best Dance Video
- Puff Daddy and Denise Richards – presented Best Group Video
- Tom Green – appeared in vignettes about Viewer's Choice voting procedures
- Wyclef Jean and Charlotte Church – presented Best New Artist in a Video
- David Bowie – introduced Lauryn Hill
- Will Smith – introduced Afeni Shakur and Voletta Wallace and presented Best Rap Video with them
- Carson Daly and Pamela Anderson – described balloting procedures, and introduced the Backstreet Boys
- Gavin Rossdale and Susan Sarandon – presented Best Female Video
- Christina Aguilera and Tommy Lee – presented Best Rock Video
- Janeane Garofalo and Method Man – presented Breakthrough Video
- Mark McGrath and Jennifer Lopez – presented Best Video From a Film
- Johnny Depp – introduced Nine Inch Nails
- Limp Bizkit (Fred Durst and Wes Borland) and Heather Locklear – presented Best Pop Video
- Prince – introduced TLC
- Mira Sorvino and Freddie Prinze Jr. – presented Best Male Video
- Regis Philbin – introduced Fatboy Slim, Richard Koufey and the Torrance Community Dance Group
- Renée Zellweger and Jay Mohr – introduced the International Viewer's Choice Awards winners
- Stone Cold Steve Austin – introduced Jay-Z
- Buddy Hackett, Heather Donahue, Joshua Leonard and Michael C. Williams – presented Best Direction in a Video
- Mary J. Blige and Lil' Kim – introduced Diana Ross and presented Best Hip-Hop Video with her
- Rebecca Romijn-Stamos, Heidi Klum and Tim Robbins – presented Viewer's Choice
- Lars Ulrich – introduced Eminem
- Madonna – introduced Paul McCartney and presented Video of the Year with him

== Winners and nominees ==
Winners are listed first and highlighted in bold.

| Video of the Year | Best Male Video |
|---|---|
| **Lauryn Hill – "Doo Wop (That Thing)"**; Backstreet Boys - "I Want It That Way"; Korn – "Freak on a Leash"; Ricky Martin – "Livin' la Vida Loca"; Will Smith (featuring Dru Hill and Kool Moe Dee) – "Wild Wild West" | **Will Smith – "Miami"**; Eminem – "My Name Is"; Lenny Kravitz – "Fly Away"; Ricky Martin – "Livin' la Vida Loca" |
| Best Female Video | Best Group Video |
| **Lauryn Hill – "Doo Wop (That Thing)"**; Jennifer Lopez – "If You Had My Love"; Madonna – "Beautiful Stranger"; Britney Spears – "...Baby One More Time" | **TLC – "No Scrubs"**; Backstreet Boys – "I Want It That Way"; Limp Bizkit – "Nookie"; *NSYNC – "Tearin' Up My Heart"; Sugar Ray – "Every Morning" |
| Best New Artist in a Video | Best Pop Video |
| **Eminem – "My Name Is"**; Kid Rock – "Bawitdaba"; Jennifer Lopez – "If You Had My Love"; Orgy – "Blue Monday" | **Ricky Martin – "Livin' la Vida Loca"**; Backstreet Boys – "I Want It That Way"; Jennifer Lopez – "If You Had My Love"; *NSYNC – "Tearin' Up My Heart"; Britney Spears – "...Baby One More Time" |
| Best Rock Video | Best R&B Video |
| **Korn – "Freak on a Leash"**; Kid Rock – "Bawitdaba"; Lenny Kravitz – "Fly Away"; Limp Bizkit – "Nookie"; The Offspring – "Pretty Fly (for a White Guy)" | **Lauryn Hill – "Doo Wop (That Thing)"**; Aaliyah – "Are You That Somebody?"; Brandy – "Have You Ever?"; Whitney Houston (featuring Faith Evans and Kelly Price) – "Heartbreak Hotel" |
| Best Rap Video | Best Hip-Hop Video |
| **Jay-Z (featuring Ja Rule and Amil) – "Can I Get A..."**; 2Pac – "Changes"; DMX – "Ruff Ryders' Anthem"; Nas (featuring Puff Daddy) – "Hate Me Now" | **Beastie Boys – "Intergalactic"**; Busta Rhymes (featuring Janet Jackson) – "What's It Gonna Be?!"; Lauryn Hill – "Doo Wop (That Thing)"; TLC – "No Scrubs" |
| Best Dance Video | Best Video from a Film |
| **Ricky Martin – "Livin' la Vida Loca"**; Cher – "Believe"; Fatboy Slim – "Praise You"; Jordan Knight – "Give It to You"; Jennifer Lopez – "If You Had My Love" | **Madonna – "Beautiful Stranger" (from Austin Powers: The Spy Who Shagged Me)**; Aaliyah – "Are You That Somebody?" (from Dr. Dolittle); Jay-Z (featuring Ja Rule and Amil) – "Can I Get A..." (from Rush Hour); Will Smith (featuring Dru Hill and Kool Moe Dee) – "Wild Wild West" (from Wild Wild West) |
| Breakthrough Video | Best Direction in a Video |
| **Fatboy Slim – "Praise You"**; Busta Rhymes – "Gimme Some More"; Eels – "Last Stop: This Town"; Eminem (featuring Dr. Dre) – "Guilty Conscience"; Korn – "Freak on a Leash"; Unkle (featuring Thom Yorke) – "Rabbit in Your Headlights" | **Fatboy Slim – "Praise You" (Director: Torrance Community Dance Group)**; Busta Rhymes (featuring Janet Jackson) – "What's It Gonna Be?!" (Directors: Hype Williams and Busta Rhymes); Eminem – "My Name Is" (Directors: Dr. Dre and Phillip Atwell); Korn – "Freak on a Leash" (Directors: Todd McFarlane, Graham Morris, Jonathan Dayton and Valerie Faris); TLC – "No Scrubs" (Director: Hype Williams) |
| Best Choreography in a Video | Best Special Effects in a Video |
| **Fatboy Slim – "Praise You" (Choreographers: Richard Koufey and Michael Rooney)**; Ricky Martin – "Livin' la Vida Loca" (Choreographer: Tina Landon); Will Smith (featuring Dru Hill and Kool Moe Dee) – "Wild Wild West" (Choreographer: Fatima Robinson); Britney Spears – "...Baby One More Time" (Choreographer: Randy Connor) | **Garbage – "Special" (Special Effects: Sean Broughton, Stuart D. Gordon and Paul Simpson of Digital Domain)**; The Black Eyed Peas – "Joints & Jam" (Special Effects: Brian Beletic and Todd Somodivilla); Busta Rhymes (featuring Janet Jackson) – "What's It Gonna Be?!" (Special Effects: Fred Raimondi); Korn – "Freak on a Leash" (Special Effects: Matt Beck, Edson Williams, and the Brothers Strause); Madonna – "Nothing Really Matters" (Special Effects: Johan Renck, Bjorn Benckert and Tor-Bjorn Olsson); Will Smith – "Miami" (Special Effects: Eric Swenson, Andrea Mansour and Simon Mowbray) |
| Best Art Direction in a Video | Best Editing in a Video |
| **Lauryn Hill – "Doo Wop (That Thing)" (Art Director: Gideon Ponte)**; Barenaked Ladies – "One Week" (Art Director: Paul Martin); Busta Rhymes (featuring Janet Jackson) – "What's It Gonna Be?!" (Art Director: Regan Jackson); Korn – "Freak on a Leash" (Art Directors: K. K. Barrett, Todd McFarlane, Terry Fitzgerald and Graham Morris); TLC – "No Scrubs" (Art Director: Regan Jackson) | **Korn – "Freak on a Leash" (Editors: Haines Hall and Michael Sachs)**; 2Pac – "Changes" (Editor: Chris Hafner); Cher – "Believe" (Editor: Scott Richter); TLC – "No Scrubs" (Editor: Harvey White) |
| Best Cinematography in a Video | Best Artist Website |
| **Marilyn Manson – "The Dope Show" (Director of Photography: Martin Coppen)**; Hole – "Malibu" (Director of Photography: Martin Coppen); Korn – "Freak on a Leash" (Director of Photography: Julian Whatley); Madonna – "Beautiful Stranger" (Director of Photography: Thomas Kloss); Will Smith – "Miami" (Director of Photography: Daniel Pearl) | **Red Hot Chili Peppers (www.redhotchilipeppers.com)**; David Bowie (www.davidbowie.com); Sheryl Crow (www.sherylcrow.com); Jennifer Lopez (www.jenniferlopez.com); Limp Bizkit (www.limp-bizkit.com); Massive Attack (www.massiveattack.co.uk); The Smashing Pumpkins (www.smashingpumpkins.com) |
| Viewer's Choice | International Viewer's Choice: MTV Australia |
| **Backstreet Boys – "I Want It That Way"**; Jay-Z (featuring Ja Rule and Amil) – "Can I Get A..."; Korn – "Freak on a Leash"; Ricky Martin – "Livin' la Vida Loca"; *NSYNC – "Tearin' Up My Heart"; TLC – "No Scrubs" | **Silverchair – "Anthem for the Year 2000"**; Neil Finn – "Sinner"; The Living End – "Save the Day"; Powderfinger – "Already Gone"; Spiderbait – "Stevie" |
| International Viewer's Choice: MTV Brasil | International Viewer's Choice: MTV India |
| **Raimundos – "Mulher de Fases"**; Banda Eva – "De Ladinho"; Barão Vermelho – "Por Você"; Capital Inicial – "O Mundo"; Charlie Brown Jr. – "Zóio de Lula"; Cidade Negra – "Já Foi"; Claudinho e Buchecha – "Só Love"; Engenheiros do Hawaii – "Eu Que Não Amo Você"; Jota Quest – "Sempre Assim"; Kid Abelha – "Eu Só Penso em Você"; Leonardo – "120, 150, 200 km/h"; Nativus – "Liberdade pra Dentro da Cabeça"; Os Paralamas do Sucesso – "Depois da Queda o Coice"; Pato Fu – "Canção pra Você Viver Mais"; Pepê e Neném – "Mania de Você"; Sandy & Junior – "No Fundo do Coração"; SPC – "Sai da Minha Aba (Bicão)"; Skank – "Mandrake e os Cubanos"; Caetano Veloso – "Sozinho"; Vinny – "Shake Boom" | **A. R. Rahman – "Dil Se Re"**; Shankar Mahadevan – "Breathless"; Sonu Nigam – "Ab Mujhe Raat Din"; Alka Yagnik and Udit Narayan – "Kuch Kuch Hota Hain"; Alka Yagnik and Udit Narayan – "Mera Mann" |
| International Viewer's Choice: MTV Korea | International Viewer's Choice: MTV Latin America (North) |
| **H.O.T. – "Make a Line"**; Cho Sung Mo – "To Heaven"; Jinusean – "Taekwon V"; No Brain – "Youth 98"; Shin Hae Chul – "Invitation to My Daily Life"; Yoo Seung Jun – "Burning Love" | **Ricky Martin – "Livin' la Vida Loca"**; Bersuit Vergarabat – "Sr. Cobranza"; Café Tacuba – "Revés"; Control Machete – "Sí, Señor"; Molotov – "El Carnal de las Estrellas" |
| International Viewer's Choice: MTV Latin America (South) | International Viewer's Choice: MTV Mandarin |
| **Ricky Martin – "Livin' la Vida Loca"**; Los Auténticos Decadentes – "Los Piratas"; Miguel Mateos – "Bar Imperio"; Molotov – "El Carnal de las Estrellas"; Los Pericos – "Sin Cadenas" | **Shino Lin – "Irritated"**; Chau Wa-Kin – "Someone with a Story"; Valen Hsu – "Don't Say Goodbye"; Faye Wong – "Quitting in Halfway"; Harlem Yu and Jeff Chang – "Love Turning Around"; Zhang Chen-Yu – "I Want Money"; Zheng Jun – "Happiness" |
| International Viewer's Choice: MTV Russia | International Viewer's Choice: MTV Southeast Asia |
| **Ricky Martin – "Livin' la Vida Loca"**; Linda – "Otpusti Menyia"; Mumiy Troll – "Ranetka"; The Offspring – "Pretty Fly (for a White Guy)"; Otpetye Moshenniki – "Lyubi Menia, Lyubi"; Britney Spears – "...Baby One More Time" | **Parokya ni Edgar – "Harana"**; Mai Charoenpura – "Mai Han Pen Rai"; Krisdayanti – "Menghitung Hari"; Poetic Ammo – "Everything Changes" |

== Artists with multiple wins and nominations ==
Artists who received multiple awards
| Wins | Artist |
|---|---|
| 5 | Ricky Martin |
| 4 | Lauryn Hill |
| 3 | Fatboy Slim |
| 2 | Korn |

Artists who received multiple nominations
| Nominations | Artist |
|---|---|
| 9 | Korn |
| 9 | Ricky Martin |
| 6 | TLC |
| 6 | Will Smith |
| 5 | Busta Rhymes |
| 5 | Jennifer Lopez |
| 5 | Lauryn Hill |
| 4 | Backstreet Boys |
| 4 | Britney Spears |
| 4 | Eminem |
| 4 | Fatboy Slim |
| 4 | Madonna |
| 3 | Jay-Z |
| 3 | Limp Bizkit |
| 3 | NSYNC |
| 2 | 2Pac |
| 2 | Aaliyah |
| 2 | Alka Yagnik |
| 2 | Cher |
| 2 | Kid Rock |
| 2 | Lenny Kravitz |
| 2 | Molotov |
| 2 | The Offspring |
| 2 | Udit Narayan |

== Music Videos with multiple wins and nominations ==
Music Videos that received multiple awards
| Wins | Artist | Music Video |
|---|---|---|
| 5 | Ricky Martin | "Livin' la Vida Loca" |
| 4 | Lauryn Hill | "Doo Wop (That Thing)" |
| 3 | Fatboy Slim | "Praise You" |
| 2 | Korn | "Freak on a Leash" |

Music Videos that received multiple nominations
| Nominations | Artist | Music Video |
|---|---|---|
| 9 | Korn | "Freak on a Leash" |
| 9 | Ricky Martin | "Livin' la Vida Loca" |
| 6 | TLC | "No Scrubs" |
| 5 | Lauryn Hill | "Doo Wop (That Thing)" |
| 4 | Backstreet Boys | "I Want It That Way" |
| 4 | Britney Spears | "...Baby One More Time" |
| 4 | Busta Rhymes (featuring Janet Jackson) | "What's It Gonna Be?!" |
| 4 | Fatboy Slim | "Praise You" |
| 4 | Jennifer Lopez | "If You Had My Love" |
| 3 | Eminem | "My Name Is" |
| 3 | Jay-Z (featuring Ja Rule and Amil) | "Can I Get A..." |
| 3 | Madonna | "Beautiful Stranger" |
| 3 | NSYNC | "Tearin' Up My Heart" |
| 3 | Will Smith | "Miami" |
| 3 | Will Smith (featuring Dru Hill and Kool Moe Dee) | "Wild Wild West" |
| 2 | 2Pac | "Changes" |
| 2 | Aaliyah | "Are You That Somebody?" |
| 2 | Cher | "Believe" |
| 2 | Kid Rock | "Bawitdaba" |
| 2 | Lenny Kravitz | "Fly Away" |
| 2 | Limp Bizkit | "Nookie" |
| 2 | Molotov | "El Carnal de las Estrellas" |
| 2 | The Offspring | "Pretty Fly (for a White Guy)" |

== See also ==
- 1999 MTV Europe Music Awards
