= MTV Video Music Award for Best Artist Website =

Annual music video award

The MTV Video Music Award for Best Artist Website was given out once in 1999 during the pre-show, and was then discontinued. The winners were the Red Hot Chili Peppers for their official website, created and run by Rockinfreakapotamus Fan Club President and Head Honcho Blackie Dammett (father of Anthony Kiedis) and Webmaster Jonathan Wade with News Director Starla Angel and Web Designer Terry Wells.

Year	Winner	Other nominees
1999	Red Hot Chili Peppers	David Bowie; Sheryl Crow; Limp Bizkit; Jennifer Lopez; Massive Attack; The Smashing Pumpkins
