= Bleuphoria =

Studio album by Rahsaan Patterson
- Released: July 19, 2011
- Length: 52:29
- Labels: Artistry; Mack Avenue
- Producers: Keith Crouch; Jamey Jaz; Rahsaan Patterson; Erik Reichers

Rahsaan Patterson chronology
The Ultimate Gift (2008)	Bleuphoria (2011)	Heroes & Gods (2019)

Singles from Bleuphoria
- 1. "Easier Said Than Done" Released: 2010

Bleuphoria is the sixth studio album by American singer Rahsaan Patterson. It was released on July 19, 2011 on Artistry Music. Production for Bleuphoria was handled primarily by Patterson and long-time collaborators Jamey Jaz and Keith Crouch. The album features guest vocals by singers Jody Watley, Shanice Wilson, Faith Evans and Lalah Hathaway, as well as a cover version of "I Only Have Eyes for You." The singles "Easier Said Than Done" and "6 AM" were released to radio and made available on iTunes.

== Critical reception ==
Professional ratings
Review scores
Source	Rating
AllMusic	3.5/5 stars

AllMusic editor Andy Kellman called Bleuphoria Patterson's "boldest and most scattered album to date." He found that "it sounds as if Patterson has never had more fun making music, indulging in his whims." L. Michael Gipson, writing for SoulTracks, felt that "overall, the ocean of his utopic vision works, though there are moments of murkiness and the waters aren’t always as deep as the myopic drawer of our bath may believe."

== Track listing ==
No.	Title	Writer(s)	Producer(s)	Length
1.	"I Only Have Eyes for You"	Al Dubin; Harry Warren	Keith Crouch; Rahsaan Patterson	4:38
2.	"Ghost" (featuring Jody Watley)	Patterson	Jamey Jaz; Patterson	3:37
3.	"Crazy (Baby)" (featuring Faith Evans & Shanice)	Darryl Stephens; Crouch; Patterson; Shanice Knox	Crouch; Patterson	3:52
4.	"Easier Said Than Done"	Patterson	Crouch	3:42
5.	"Stay with Me"	Crouch; Patterson	Crouch; Patterson	4:58
6.	"Miss You"	Patterson	Patterson	4:12
7.	"Goodbye"	Patterson	Jaz; Patterson	6:47
8.	"Bleuphoria"	Patterson	Crouch; Patterson	2:46
9.	"Mountain Top"	Patterson	Crouch; Patterson	5:57
10.	"Makin' Love"	Crouch; Patterson	Crouch; Patterson	4:14
11.	"6 AM" (featuring Lalah Hathaway)	Hathaway; Patterson	Patterson	3:47
12.	"Insomia"	Patterson	Jaz; Patterson	3:49
13.	"God"	Erik Reichers; Patterson	Reichers; Patterson	3:30

== Charts ==
Chart (2011)	Peak position
US Top R&B/Hip-Hop Albums (Billboard)	36
US Independent Albums (Billboard)	42

== Release history ==
Bleuphoria release history
Region	Date	Format	Label	Ref(s)
United States	July 19, 2011	CD; cassette	Artistry Music	
