= Easier Said Than Done (Rahsaan Patterson song) =

Single by Rahsaan Patterson

from the album Bleuphoria
- Released: 2010
- Recorded: 2009, 2010
- Genre: R&B, funk
- Length: 3:42
- Label: Mack Avenue Records; Artistry Music
- Songwriter: Rahsaan Patterson
- Producer: Jamey Jaz

Rahsaan Patterson singles chronology
"Feels Good" (2008)	"Easier Said Than Done" (2010)	"6 AM" (2011)

"Easier Said Than Done" is a song by American R&B/soul singer Rahsaan Patterson, released in 2010. It is the official lead single from his latest album, Bleuphoria. The song was released on December 14, 2010, on iTunes and Amazon retail music website.

== Track listing ==
US digital single

No.	Title	Length
1.	"Easier Said Than Done" (Radio Mix)	3:42
