= Basic (Glen Campbell album) =

Studio album by Glen Campbell
- Released: October 1978
- Recorded: 1978, Lagniappe, Sherman Oaks, California
- Genre: Country
- Length: 33:34
- Label: Capitol
- Producer: Glen Campbell, Tom Thacker

Glen Campbell chronology
Live at the Royal Festival Hall (1977)	Basic (1978)	Highwayman (1979)

Professional ratings
Review scores
Source	Rating
AllMusic	4.5/5 stars

Basic is a studio album by American singer/guitarist Glen Campbell, released in 1978.

== Track listing ==
All tracks composed by Michael Smotherman; except where indicated
Side 1:

1. "(You've Got To) Sing It Nice and Loud for Me Sonny" (Michael Smotherman, Marc Durham) – 2:45
2. "Stranger in the Mirror" – 3:44
3. "Can You Fool" – 3:08
4. "I See Love" – 2:13
5. "(When I Feel Like) I Got No Love in Me" – 3:24

Side 2:

1. "Love Takes You Higher" – 2:39
2. "Never Tell Me No Lies" – 2:18
3. "I'm Gonna Love You" – 3:22
4. "California" – 3:31
5. "Let's All Sing a Song About It" (Smotherman, Billy Burnette) – 3:14
6. "Grafhaidh Me Thu" – 2:36

== Personnel ==
- Glen Campbell – acoustic guitars, electric guitars, bagpipes
- Craig Fall – acoustic guitars, electric guitars
- Bill McCubbin – bass guitar
- Steve Turner – drums
- Ed Greene – drums
- Micheal Smotherman – keyboards
- Carl Jackson – acoustic guitars, electric guitars, banjo
- Ethan Reilly – steel guitar
- TJ Kuenster – piano
- Fred Tackett – acoustic guitar
- Lee Ritenour – guitar solo on "Never Tell Me No Lies"
- Fred Tackett, Ed Greene, Carl Jackson, Micheal Smotherman, TJ Kuenster, Bill McCubbin, Steve Turner, Craig Fall, Dan Kuenster, David Turner, Laura Turner, Jo Dell Smotherman, Kathy Smotherman, Steve Crossley (who also adds acoustic guitar) - backing vocals
- Sid Sharp, Jim Getzoff, David Schwartz, Linn Subotnick, Armand Kaproff - string quintet

== Production ==
- Producers – Glen Campbell, Tom Thacker
- Recording Engineer – Chuck Mellone
- Mastered – Wally Traugott, Capitol studios
- String arrangements – TJ Kuenster, Larry Muhoberac
- Photography – Norman Seeff

== Charts ==
Album – Billboard (United States)

Chart	Entry date	Peak position	No. of weeks
Billboard Country Albums	September 12, 1978	17	15
Billboard 200	December 16, 1978	164	5

Singles – Billboard (United States)

Year	Single	Hot Country Singles	Hot 100	Easy Listening
1978	"Can You Fool"	16	38	7
1979	"I'm Gonna Love You"	13	-	38
1979	"California"	45	-	-
