= Where You Are (Rahsaan Patterson song) =

Single by Rahsaan Patterson

from the album Rahsaan Patterson and Bulletproof soundtrack
- Released: 1997
- Genre: R&B, pop
- Length: 3:29
- Label: MCA
- Songwriters: Rahsaan Patterson; Jamey Jaz
- Producers: Jamey Jaz; Steve "Silk" Hurley (producer:remix)

Rahsaan Patterson singles chronology
"Stop By" (1997)	"Where You Are" (1997)	"Treat You Like a Queen" (1999)

"Where You Are" is a single released in 1997 by American neo soul singer Rahsaan Patterson. The song was released in support of his debut studio album, Rahsaan Patterson, and appeared on the Bulletproof soundtrack in 1996. "Where You Are" peaked at number 53 on the Billboard Hot R&B Singles chart. The song was released as a single in the UK in 1998, peaking at #55.

== Track listing ==
UK CD" single

No.	Title	Length
1.	"Where You Are" (Radio Edit)
2.	"Where You Are" (Silk's Old Skool Mix)
3.	"Where You Are" (Silk's House Mix)
4.	"Stop By" (Sly and Poolio's Fx Flava Dub Mix)

== Charts ==
Chart (1997)	Peak position
Billboard Hot R&B Singles	53
