= What's It Gonna Be?! =

1999 single by Busta Rhymes

Single by Busta Rhymes featuring Janet Jackson

from the album Extinction Level Event: The Final World Front
- B-side: "Tear da Roof Off"
- Released: March 9, 1999
- Studio: Soundtrack, Quad (New York City); House of Blues (Memphis, Tennessee)
- Length: 5:24
- Label: Elektra; Flipmode
- Songwriters: Trevor Smith; Darrell Allamby; Antoinette Roberson
- Producer: Darrell "Delite" Allamby

Busta Rhymes singles chronology
| "Da Goodness" (1998) | "What's It Gonna Be?!" (1999) | "Everybody Come On" (1999) |

Janet Jackson singles chronology
| "You" (1998) | "What's It Gonna Be?!" (1999) | "Girlfriend/Boyfriend" (1999) |

Music video
- "What's It Gonna Be?!" on YouTube

"What's It Gonna Be?!" is a song by American rapper Busta Rhymes featuring American singer Janet Jackson. It was released as the fourth and last single from Rhymes' third studio album Extinction Level Event: The Final World Front on March 9, 1999, by Flipmode Entertainment and Elektra Records. The song was written by Rhymes, Antoinette Roberson and its producer Darrell "Delite" Allamby. The song was a commercial and critical success, reaching number three on the US Billboard Hot 100 and entering the top 40 in various countries. It was nominated for a Grammy Award for Best Rap Performance by a Duo or Group at the 2000 Grammy Awards.

The music video, directed by Rhymes & Hype Williams, was critically lauded, and received four MTV Video Music Awards nominations at the 1999 MTV Video Music Awards. It is one of the most expensive music videos ever made. The song appears on Rhymes' compilation albums Total Devastation: The Best of Busta Rhymes and Turn It Up! The Very Best of Busta Rhymes as well as Jackson's Number Ones greatest hits album. Jackson included the song as an interlude on her Number Ones: Up Close and Personal tour and sang it for the first time on the second leg of her 2018 State of the World Tour.

== Composition ==
"What's It Gonna Be?!" was composed in 4/4 time and the key of C minor, with a tempo of 116 beats per minute. It has a duration time of five minutes and twenty-four seconds.

== Commercial performance ==
The song peaked at number three on the US Billboard Hot 100 and reached number one on both the Hot R&B Singles & Tracks and Hot Rap Singles charts. It also reached number five on the Rhythmic Top 40. It was a top ten hit in the United Kingdom, New Zealand, and South Africa. It was a moderate success in Europe, reaching the top forty in most countries. The song sold 800,000 copies in the United States and was certified gold by the Recording Industry Association of America (RIAA). The single entered at number one on the UK R&B Singles Chart.

== Music video ==
The music video for the song was directed by Hype Williams on March 12, 1999. It is one of the most expensive videos ever made, costing upwards of $2 million, and focused largely on special effects. The video begins with a glass of silver liquid moving toward the edge of its resting area, which spills and transforms into Busta Rhymes as a knight in shining armor before he begins rapping. Jackson is portrayed as a dominatrix, in a revealing purple latex suit adorned with cock rings and nail piercings.

The video contains frequent sexual innuendo, visually based on the song's lyrical themes, portraying imagery alluding to wet dreams and stimulated wetness. Jackson appears in a liquid tunnel as Rhymes morphs into a sperm-like creature and floats towards her. A marching band of miniature Bustas passes through the tunnel's walls as Busta transforms into one himself, before morphing again to rise through the tunnel's ceiling. Electric sparks fly as miniature versions of himself pour like raindrops onto Jackson's breasts. Towards the finale, Rhymes and Jackson are united as their bodies rub up on each other. The remaining scenery then combusts as they continue transforming into a silver liquid. The video ends with "Hot Shit Makin' Ya Bounce" playing on the speakers.

== Track listings ==
=== US 12" vinyl maxi single ===
- A1. "What's It Gonna Be?!" (LP version – dirty) – 5:28
- A2. "What's It Gonna Be?!" (instrumental) – 5:28
- A3. "What's It Gonna Be?!" (LP version clean – edit) – 4:19
- B1. "What's It Gonna Be?!" (LP version – clean) – 5:28
- B2. "What's It Gonna Be?!" (instrumental) – 5:28

=== Germany 5" CD single ===
1. "What's It Gonna Be?!" (Soul Society remix) – 3:56
2. "What's It Gonna Be?!" (LP version clean – edit) – 4:04
3. "What's It Gonna Be?!" (Micky Finn D&B remix) – 5:59

=== US 5" CD single ===
1. "What's It Gonna Be?!" (LP version clean – edit) – 4:09
2. "What's It Gonna Be?!" (LP version clean) – 5:29

=== UK cassette single ===
- A1. "What's It Gonna Be?!" (LP version clean – edit) – 4:09
- A2. "What's It Gonna Be?!" (Soul Society remix) – 3:53
- B1. "What's It Gonna Be?!" (LP version clean – edit) – 4:09
- B2. "What's It Gonna Be?!" (Soul Society remix) – 3:53

== Charts ==
=== Weekly charts ===
Weekly chart performance for "What's It Gonna Be?!"
| Chart (1999) | Peak position |
|---|---|
| Australia (ARIA) | 65 |
| Belgium (Ultratip Bubbling Under Flanders) | 2 |
| Canada (Nielsen SoundScan) | 21 |
| Canada Contemporary Hit Radio (BDS) | 27 |
| Europe (Eurochart Hot 100) | 22 |
| Germany (GfK) | 42 |
| Netherlands (Dutch Top 40) | 24 |
| Netherlands (Single Top 100) | 29 |
| New Zealand (Recorded Music NZ) | 7 |
| Scottish Singles Chart | 16 |
| Sweden (Sverigetopplistan) | 58 |
| Switzerland (Schweizer Hitparade) | 41 |
| UK Singles (Official Charts) | 6 |
| UK R&B Singles (Official Charts) | 1 |
| US Billboard Hot 100 | 3 |
| US Hot R&B/Hip-Hop Songs (Billboard) | 1 |
| US Hot Rap Songs (Billboard) | 1 |
| US Pop Airplay (Billboard) | 40 |
| US Rhythmic Airplay (Billboard) | 5 |

=== Year-end charts ===
Year-end chart performance for "What's It Gonna Be?!"
| Chart (1999) | Position |
|---|---|
| Netherlands (Dutch Top 40) | 176 |
| UK Singles (OCC) | 131 |
| US Billboard Hot 100 | 27 |
| US Hot R&B/Hip-Hop Singles & Tracks (Billboard) | 8 |
| US Hot Rap Singles (Billboard) | 2 |
| US Rhythmic Top 40 (Billboard) | 37 |

== Certifications ==
Certifications for "What's It Gonna Be?!"
| Region | Certification | Certified units/sales |
|---|---|---|
| United States (RIAA) | Gold | 951,786 |

== See also ==
- R&B number-one hits of 1999 (USA)
- List of most expensive music videos
