= I'll Bee Dat! =

Single by Redman

from the album Doc's da Name 2000
- B-side: "Well All Rite Cha"
- Released: December 8, 1998
- Recorded: 1998
- Studio: Mirror Image Studios West (New York, NY)
- Genre: Hip-hop
- Length: 4:34
- Label: Def Jam
- Songwriter: Reggie Noble
- Producer: Rockwilder

Redman singles chronology
"How Deep Is Your Love" (1998)	"I'll Bee Dat!" (1998)	"Da Goodness" (1999)

Music video
- "I'll Bee Dat" on YouTube

Professional ratings
Review scores
Source	Rating
AllMusic	2/5 stars

"I'll Bee Dat!" is a song written and performed by American rapper Redman. It was released on December 8, 1998, through Def Jam Recordings as the lead single from the rapper's fourth solo studio album, Doc's da Name 2000. Recording sessions took place at Mirror Image Studios West in New York City. Production was handled by Rockwilder, who used a sample from Beenie Man's "Who Am I (Sim Simma)". Music video for the song was directed by Director X.

The single peaked at number 50 on the Hot R&B/Hip-Hop Songs, number 55 on the R&B/Hip-Hop Airplay, and number 30 on the Hot Rap Songs in the United States. XXL ranked it as one of "20 of the Best Redman Songs".

== Track listing ==
Vinyl 12" 33 ⅓ RPM
No.	Title	Writer(s)	Length
1.	"I'll Bee Dat!" (Radio Edit)
2.	"I'll Bee Dat!" (LP Version)	Reginald Noble; Dana Stinson; Moses Davis; Jeremy Harding; Ahmir Thompson; Tariq Collins; Malik Smart; K. Saunders; J. Gray
3.	"I'll Bee Dat!" (Instrumental)
4.	"Well All Rite Cha (Radio Edit)" (featuring Method Man)
5.	"Well All Rite Cha (LP Version)" (featuring Method Man)	Noble; Clifford Smith; Erick Sermon
6.	"Well All Rite Cha (Instrumental)" (featuring Method Man)

CD Maxi-Single
No.	Title	Producer(s)	Length
1.	"I'll Bee Dat!" (Explicit)	Rockwilder
2.	"Well All Rite Cha (Explicit)" (featuring Method Man)	Erick Sermon
3.	"Pick It Up" (Warren G Remix)	Warren G
4.	"I'll Bee Dat!" (Instrumental)	Rockwilder

== Charts ==
Chart (1998–99)	Peak position
US Hot R&B/Hip-Hop Songs (Billboard)	50
US R&B/Hip-Hop Airplay (Billboard)	55
US Hot Rap Songs (Billboard)	30

== Personnel ==
- Reginald "Redman" Noble – vocals
- Dana "Rockwilder" Stinson – producer
- Bob Brown – mixing
