= Easier Said Than Done (album) =

Studio album by Pool Kids
- Released: August 15, 2025
- Recorded: 2024
- Studio: Hall of Justice & Soundhouse, Seattle; The Unknown, Anacortes; The Miller House, Miami
- Genre: Emo, pop-punk
- Length: 39:44
- Label: Epitaph
- Producer: Mike Vernon Davis

Pool Kids chronology
| Pool Kids (2023) | Easier Said Than Done (2025) |

Singles from Easier Said Than Done
- 1. "Easier Said Than Done" Released: June 4, 2025; 2. "Leona Street" Released: July 17, 2025

Easier Said Than Done is the third studio album by American emo rock group Pool Kids. It was released on August 15, 2025, via Epitaph Records in vinyl, CD and digital formats.

== Background ==
The album was recorded by the band with Mike Vernon Davis, who also produced it. It was preceded by the band's 2023 self-titled album. It is the band's first release on Epitaph and incorporates elements of ballad, synth-pop and slacker rock.

On June 4, 2025, the title track, noted as "a slow-burning song" of art pop and rock, was released as the lead single of the album, alongside a music video directed by Zach Miller. Noted as depicting the band "at their most reflective", the second single, "Leona Street", was released on July 17, 2025, together with a Christine Goodwyne-directed music video.

== Reception ==
Professional ratings
Review scores
| Source | Rating |
|---|---|
| Clash | 8/10 stars |
| Dork | 4/5 stars |
| Kerrang! | 4/5 stars |
| The Line of Best Fit | 7/10 stars |

Andrew Sacher of BrooklynVegan noted that the album represents the band "putting all the initial emphasis on the structure and emotion of the songs and adding in the technical flairs later on," calling it their "poppiest album yet" which "feels like as much of a natural progression from the self-titled as that album did from the debut."

Kerrang!'s James MacKinnon gave the album a verdict of four out of five, describing it as the band's "boldest record yet on a shoestring budget," and calling it "brilliant and frequently surprising". Grant Sharples of Paste noted the work as "a record, more than anything, about being in a DIY rock band and all the inevitable thrills and hardships that ensue," stating it "finds Pool Kids at their apotheosis, breathing new life into universal feelings." Writing for Clash, Paulina Subia assigned Easier Said Than Done a rating of eight out of ten and remarked, "There is a refreshing honesty told in the lives personified across the album and, in the world of each song, no story is off-limits."

Will Yarbrough for The Line of Best Fit gave it a rating score of seven and referred to it as "a transition album", calling it "the one before Pool Kids truly made the leap, when they were figuring out how to add new ripples onto what they do better than anyone else." Dork's Harry Shaw rated it four out of five, remarking "If their self-titled debut was the sound of a band arriving, Easier Said Than Done is the sound of them moving in, painting the walls and leaving the front door open."

== Track listing ==
All tracks are written by Christine Goodwyne.

Easier Said Than Done track listing
| No. | Title | Length |
|---|---|---|
| 1. | "Easier Said Than Done" | 3:05 |
| 2. | "Tinted Windows" | 3:15 |
| 3. | "Bad Bruise" | 3:07 |
| 4. | "Leona Street" | 3:27 |
| 5. | "Last Word" | 4:13 |
| 6. | "Sorry Not Sorry" | 4:05 |
| 7. | "Not Too Late" | 2:54 |
| 8. | "Which Is Worse?" | 2:48 |
| 9. | "Dani" | 5:22 |
| 10. | "Perfect View" | 3:42 |
| 11. | "Exit Plan" | 3:46 |
| Total length: | | 39:44 |

== Personnel ==
Credits adapted from Bandcamp.

=== Pool Kids ===
- Christine Goodwyne – vocals, guitar, additional vocals, additional instrumentation, arrangements
- Andrew Anaya – guitar, additional vocals, additional instrumentation, arrangements
- Nicolette Alvarez – bass, additional vocals, additional instrumentation, arrangements
- Caden Clinton – drums, additional vocals, additional instrumentation, arrangements

=== Additional ===
- Mike Vernon Davis – additional vocals, additional instrumentation, keyboards, programming, production, mixing, additional engineering
- Sam Rosson – engineering
- Greg Calbi – mastering
- Steve Fallone – mastering
- Ryan Haft – additional engineering on "Not Too Late"

== Charts ==
Chart performance for Easier Said Than Done
| Chart (2026) | Peak position |
|---|---|
| UK Record Store (OCC) | 32 |
