= Treat You Like a Queen =

"Treat You Like A Queen"

Single by Rahsaan Patterson

from the album Love in Stereo
- Released: August 24, 1999
- Recorded: 1998
- Genre: R&B
- Length: 4:29
- Label: MCA Records
- Songwriter(s): Rahsaan Patterson; Les Pierce
- Producer(s): Les Pierce

Rahsaan Patterson singles chronology
"Where You Are" (1997)	"Treat You Like A Queen" (1999)	"The Moment" (1999)

"Treat You Like a Queen" is a song released in 1999 by American R&B singer Rahsaan Patterson. The song was the lead single in support of his second studio album, Love in Stereo. The song peaked at NO. 61 on the Billboard Hot R&B Singles & Tracks chart.

== Track listing ==
Promo, US CD" single

No.	Title	Length
1.	"Treat You Like A Queen" (Radio Edit)
2.	"Treat You Like A Queen" (Album Version)
3.	"Treat You Like A Queen" (Instrumental)

== Charts ==
Chart (1999)	Peak position
Billboard Hot R&B Singles & Tracks	61
