= Love in Stereo (Rahsaan Patterson album) =

Love In Stereo

Studio album by Rahsaan Patterson
- Released: October 26, 1999
- Length: 50:15
- Label: MCA
- Producer: Van Hunt; Randy Jackson; Jamey Jaz; Rahsaan Patterson; Les Pierce; Soulshock & Karlin

Rahsaan Patterson chronology
Rahsaan Patterson (1997)	Love In Stereo (1999)	After Hours (2004)

Love In Stereo is the second studio album by American singer Rahsaan Patterson. It was released by MCA Records on October 26, 1999, in the United States. The album peaked at number 51 on the US Billboard Top R&B/Hip-Hop Albums chart. Lead single "Treat You Like a Queen" reached number 61 on the US Billboard Hot R&B/Hip-Hop Songs chart.

== Critical reception ==
Professional ratings
Review scores
Source	Rating
AllMusic	3.5/5 stars

AllMusic editor Stacia Proefrock found that Love in Stereo showed that "Patterson not only overcame the sophomore slump but triumphed with a very well-crafted album that far surpasses his completely adequate first release. Slick production and strong songwriting help support Patterson's smooth, laid-back style and Stevie Wonder-like vocals [...] Patterson is not only paying homage to Wonder in approach, but also in spirit. "Sure Boy" and "The Day" are only two of several other songs on the collection that are extremely well-written with an inspirational edge. Never preachy and always stylish, on Love in Stereo Patterson has managed to make an album that should appeal to a broad range of R&B fans."

== Track listing ==
No.	Title	Length
1.	"Treat You Like a Queen"	4:29
2.	"Sure Boy"	3:58
3.	"It's Alright Now"	5:34
4.	"Do You Feel the Way I Do"	4:11
5.	"Friend of Mine"	3:58
6.	"The Day"	5:02
7.	"It Ain't Love"	5:18
8.	"Humor"	4:36
9.	"The Moment"	4:15
10.	"So Right"	5:48
11.	"Any Other Love"	4:37
12.	"Get Here"	5:15

== Charts ==
Chart (1999)	Peak position
US Top R&B/Hip-Hop Albums (Billboard)	51
