= Wines & Spirits =

Studio album by Rahsaan Patterson
- Released: September 25, 2007
- Length: 50:15
- Labels: Artistry Music; Dome
- Producers: Timothy "Twizz" Bailey, Jr; Brian Bromberg; Keith Crouch; Jamey Jaz; Audius Mtawaira; Rahsaan Patterson

Rahsaan Patterson chronology
After Hours (2004)	Wines & Spirits (2007)	The Ultimate Gift (2008)

Wines & Spirits is the fourth studio album by American singer Rahsaan Patterson. It was released in September 2007, under Artistry Music. The album was produced by Patterson, along with longtime collaborators Jamey Jaz and Keith Crouch and a variety of other producers. It debuted at number 42 on the US Billboard Top R&B/Hip-Hop Albums chart and produced the singles "Stop Breaking My Heart" and "Feels Good."

== Critical reception ==
Professional ratings
Review scores
Source	Rating
About.com	4/5 stars
AllMusic	4.5/5 stars

AllMusic editor Andy Kellman found that the album "does go in several directions and will take longer to process than Patterson's previous three, but that'll only make the wait for his fifth album a little more tolerable. More crucially, the variety of sounds and emotions is not the result of trying to see what sticks. It all seems to have come naturally. Most crucially, it all sticks."

== Track listing ==
No.	Title	Length
1.	"Cloud 9"	4:24
2.	"Delirium (Comes and Goes)"	3:09
3.	"Feels Good"	4:30
4.	"No Danger"	3:56
5.	"Pitch Black"	4:15
6.	"Time"	4:41
7.	"Stop Breaking My Heart"	5:12
8.	"Water"	4:23
9.	"Deliver Me"	4:04
10.	"Oh Lord (Take Me Back)"	4:19
11.	"Higher Love"	4:02
12.	"Stars"	3:20

== Charts ==
Chart (2007)	Peak position
US Top R&B/Hip-Hop Albums (Billboard)	42
US Independent Albums (Billboard)	45
