= Rahsaan Patterson (album) =

Studio album by Rahsaan Patterson
- Released: January 28, 1997
- Length: 66:20
- Label: MCA
- Producer: Dinky Bingham; Christopher Bolden; Keith Crouch; Jamey Jaz; Les Pierce; Ira Schickman

Rahsaan Patterson chronology
Rahsaan Patterson (1997)	Love in Stereo (1999)

Rahsaan Patterson is the debut studio album by American R&B singer Rahsaan Patterson. It was released by MCA Records on January 28, 1997 in the United States. Produced by Dinky Bingham, Christopher Bolden, Keith Crouch, Jamey Jaz, Les Pierce, and Ira Schickman, the album peaked at number 48 on the US Billboard Top R&B/Hip-Hop Albums chart.

== Critical reception ==
Professional ratings
Review scores
Source	Rating
AllMusic	3.5/5 stars
USA Today	3.5/4 stars

AllMusic editor Alex Henderson compared the singer's performance on his debut album with Stevie Wonder and added: "One thing Patterson won't be accused of is favoring style over substance – when many of his contemporaries in the urban contemporary market were heavily into gimmickry, Patterson kept things honest and straightforward on a disc that isn't breathtaking, but is heartfelt and satisfying." Billboard found that Rahsaan Patterson "issues a cavalcade of infectious tunes sure to attract a broad consumer base [...] Although the album taps vintage soul sounds, the overall feel remains grounded in contemporary rhythms."

== Chart performance ==
Rahsaan Patterson peaked at number 48 on the US Billboard Top R&B/Hip-Hop Albums chart in the week ending February 15, 1997.

== Track listing ==
No.	Title	Writer(s)	Producer(s)	Length
1.	"Stop By"	Glenny McKinney; Keith Crouch; Rahsaan Patterson; Roy Pennon	Crouch	5:55
2.	"Spend the Night"	Jamey Jaz; Patterson	Jaz	4:52
3.	"Where You Are"	Jaz; Patterson	Jaz	5:09
4.	"So Fine"	Jaz; Crouch; Patterson	Jaz; Crouch	4:32
5.	"Stay Awhile"	Jaz; Patterson	Jaz	5:09
6.	"Come Over"	Crouch	Crouch	4:49
7.	"Can't We Wait a Minute"	Jaz; Patterson	Jaz	5:43
8.	"Joy"	Les Pierce; Patterson	Pierce	2:52
9.	"My Sweetheart"	Jaz; Kevin Wyatt; Patterson	Jaz	3:56
10.	"One More Night"	Ira Schickman	Schickman; Dinky Bingham	4:06
11.	"Don't Wanna Lose It"	Pierce; Patterson	Pierce	4:33
12.	"Tears Ago"	Christopher Bolden; Tony Bohrer	Bolden	5:02
13.	"Ain't No Way"	Pierce; Patterson	Pierce	4:10
14.	"Soul Free"	Jaz; Patterson	Jaz	5:23
Total length:				65:17

== Charts ==
Chart (1997)	Peak position
US Top R&B/Hip-Hop Albums (Billboard)	48

== Release history ==
Rahsaan Patterson release history
Region	Date	Format	Label	Ref(s)
United States	January 28, 1997	CD; cassette	MCA Records	
