= Artistry Music =

American record label

- Parent company: Mack Avenue Records
- Founder: Rick Braun; Richard Elliot
- Genre: Smooth jazz
- Country of origin: U.S.

Artistry Music (formerly 'ARTizen Music Group') is a record label founded by Brian Bromberg, Lucille Hunt, Rahsaan Patterson, and Denny Stilwell that specializes in smooth jazz. In 2008, Mack Avenue Records bought the label.

In July 2006 Artistry released To Grover, With Love, a tribute to Grover Washington, Jr. Contributors to the album included Regina Belle, Dave Koz, Russ Freeman, Gerald Albright, Peter White, Chuck Loeb, Joe Sample, George Duke, and Steve Cole. "Just the Two of Us", featuring Belle, Duke and Cole, was the album's most successful track, reaching No. 4 on the Billboard Top Contemporary Jazz chart.
