= A Tribe Called Quest discography =

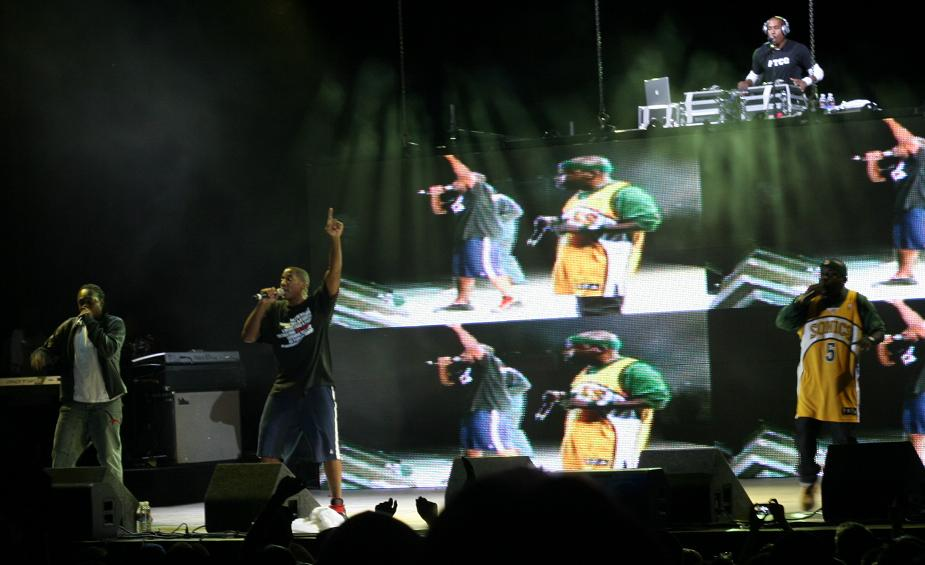
- Studio albums: 6
- Extended plays: 2
- Compilation albums: 5
- Singles: 16
- Features singles: 4

A Tribe Called Quest was an American hip hop group, formed in 1985. They released six studio albums, five compilations, sixteen singles and two extended plays. The group was made up of rapper/main producer Q-Tip (Kamaal Ibn John Fareed, formerly Jonathan Davis), the late rapper Phife Dawg (Malik Taylor) and DJ/co-producer Ali Shaheed Muhammad. Phife Dawg was only persuaded to join when a fourth member, rapper Jarobi White, joined the group. In 1989 they signed a demo deal with Geffen Records, but not given a full-fledged recording contract. After receiving many offers, they opted for the Jive Records label, an independent rap label. In under a year, they managed to produce People's Instinctive Travels and the Paths of Rhythm to critical acclaim, but lukewarm sales, reaching #91 on the Billboard 200, though it did eventually achieve gold certification by the Recording Industry Association of America (RIAA).

Their next album, The Low End Theory, helped shape alternative hip-hop in the 1990s. It established a link between their hip hop based music and the jazz genre. It was a large success, and, on February 1, 1995, the RIAA certified the album platinum. Their following album, Midnight Marauders, released in 1993, also earned the platinum award. Beats, Rhymes and Life, their subsequent album which was released three years after Midnight Marauders, was considered their darkest work. It lacked the positive and joyful vibe present in their previous albums. Their fifth studio album followed, The Love Movement. It was regarded by critics as returning to the group's positive vibe. It was awarded gold by the RIAA on November 1, 1998. Their sixth and final album, We Got It from Here... Thank You 4 Your Service, was released on November 11, 2016, with posthumous contributions from Phife Dawg. On May 22, 2017, the album was certified gold by the RIAA.

== Albums ==
=== Studio albums ===
List of studio albums, with selected chart positions and certifications
Title	Album details	Peak chart positions										Certifications
Title	Album details	US	US R&B /HH	AUS	CAN	FRA	GER	SWE	NED	NZ	UK	Certifications
People's Instinctive Travels and the Paths of Rhythm	Released: April 10, 1990; Label: Jive; Format: CD, LP, cassette, digital download, streaming	91	23	184	—	—	—	—	—	—	54	RIAA: Gold; BPI: Silver
The Low End Theory	Released: September 24, 1991; Label: Jive; Format: CD, LP, cassette, digital download, streaming	45	13	—	—	—	—	—	—	—	58	RIAA: Platinum; BPI: Silver
Midnight Marauders	Released: November 9, 1993; Label: Jive; Format: CD, LP, cassette, digital download, streaming	8	1	181	48	—	—	—	—	—	70	RIAA: Platinum; BPI: Silver
Beats, Rhymes and Life	Released: July 30, 1996; Label: Jive; Format: CD, LP, cassette, digital download, streaming	1	1	136	7	—	—	30	—	32	28	RIAA: Platinum; MC: Gold
The Love Movement	Released: September 29, 1998; Label: Jive; Format: CD, LP, cassette, digital download, streaming	3	3	133	2	40	36	45	—	—	38	RIAA: Gold; MC: Gold
We Got It from Here... Thank You 4 Your Service	Released: November 11, 2016; Label: Epic; Format: CD, LP, cassette, digital download, streaming	1	1	13	3	75	14	31	16	13	24	RIAA: Gold; BPI: Silver
"—" denotes releases that did not chart.

=== Live albums ===
List of live albums
Title	Album details
Live in Chicago '98	Released: September 19, 2019; Label: Boarding House Presents; Format: digital download, streaming

=== Remix albums ===
List of remix albums
Title	Album details
Revised Quest for the Seasoned Traveller	Released: June 1, 1992; Label: Jive; Format: CD, LP, cassette, digital download, streaming

=== Compilations albums ===
List of albums, with selected chart positions
Title	Album details	Peak chart positions				
Title	Album details	US	US R&B /HH	CAN R&B	UK R&B	UK Ind.
The Anthology	Released: October 26, 1999; Label: Jive; Format: CD, LP, cassette, digital download, streaming	81	28	2	22	26
Hits, Rarities & Remixes	Released: June 17, 2003; Label: Jive; Format: CD, LP, digital download, streaming	190	51	—	—	—
The Lost Tribes	Released: March 15, 2006; Label: Jive; Format: CD	—	—	—	—	—
The Best of A Tribe Called Quest	Released: April 1, 2008; Label: Sony BMG; Format: CD, streaming	—	—	—	—	—
"—" denotes a recording that did not chart.

== EPs ==
List of extended plays with selected chart positions
Title	EP details	Peak chart positions			
Title	EP details	US Dance	UK	UK Dance	UK R&B
People's Instinctive Remixes	Released: 1991; Label: Jive; Format: CD	—	—	—	—
A Tribe Called Quest EP (compilation EP)	Released: 1994 (UK only); Label: Jive; Format: CD, LP	—	—	22	28
Jive Classic 12" #1: Bonita Applebum/I Left My Wallet in El Segundo (compilation EP)	Released: 1997; Label: Jive; Format: LP	— (Note: "Jive Classic 12" 1: Bonita Applebum/I Left My Wallet in El Segundo" did not enter the Dance Club Songs, but peaked at number 28 on the Dance Singles Sales.)	—	—	—
Jive Classic 12" #2: Check the Rhime/Award Tour (compilation EP)	Released: 1997; Label: Jive; Format: LP	—	—	—	—
Jive Classic 12" #3: Scenario/Oh My God/Jazz (We've Got) (compilation EP)	Released: 1997; Label: Jive; Format: LP	— (Note: "Jive Classic 12" 3: Scenario/Oh My God/Jazz (We've Got)" did not enter the Dance Club Songs, but peaked at number 10 on the Dance Singles Sales.)	—	—	—
The Jam EP (compilation EP)	Released: August 11, 1997 (UK only); Label: Jive; Format: CD, LP	—	61	1	12
"—" denotes a recording that did not chart.

=== Promotional EPs ===
List of promotional EPs
Title	Album details
Classics (compilation EP)	Released: 1996; Label: Jive; Format: CD, LP

== Singles ==
=== As lead artist ===
List of singles as lead artist, with selected chart positions, showing year released and album name
Title	Year	Peak chart positions										Certifications	Album
Title	Year	US	US Dance	US R&B	US Rap	AUS	CAN	NED	NZ	SCO	UK	Certifications	Album
"Description of a Fool"	1989	—	—	—	—	—	—	—	—	—	—		People's Instinctive Travels and the Paths of Rhythm
"I Left My Wallet in El Segundo"	1990	—	— (Note: "I Left My Wallet in El Segundo" did not enter the Dance Club Songs, but peaked at number 49 on the Dance Singles Sales.)	—	9	—	—	—	—	—	—		People's Instinctive Travels and the Paths of Rhythm
"Bonita Applebum"	1990	—	—	56	4	144	—	—	—	—	47		People's Instinctive Travels and the Paths of Rhythm
"Can I Kick It?"	1990	—	—	—	8	152	—	13	—	—	15	BPI: Gold; RMNZ: Platinum	People's Instinctive Travels and the Paths of Rhythm
"I Left My Wallet in El Segundo (Vampire Mix)"	1991	—	—	—	—	—	—	23	—	—	86		People's Instinctive Remixes
"Check the Rhime"	1991	—	— (Note: "Check the Rhime" did not enter the Dance Club Songs, but peaked at number 28 on the Dance Singles Sales.)	59	1	—	—	—	—	—	—	RIAA: Gold	The Low End Theory
"Jazz (We've Got)"	1991	—	—	—	19	—	—	—	—	—	—		The Low End Theory
"Scenario" (featuring Leaders of the New School)	1992	57	— (Note: "Scenario" did not enter the Dance Club Songs, but peaked at number 38 on the Dance Singles Sales.)	42	6	—	—	—	—	—	—	RIAA: Gold	The Low End Theory
"Luck of Lucien (Tom and Jerry Remix)"	1992	—	—	—	—	—	—	—	—	—	—		Revised Quest for the Seasoned Traveller
"Can I Kick It? (Boilerhouse Remix)"	1992	—	—	—	—	—	—	—	—	—	—		Revised Quest for the Seasoned Traveller
"Hot Sex"	1992	—	— (Note: "Hot Sex" did not enter the Dance Club Songs, but peaked at number 27 on the Dance Singles Sales.)	99	—	—	—	—	—	—	—		Boomerang Soundtrack
"Award Tour" (featuring Trugoy the Dove)	1993	47	27	27	7	—	—	—	—	—	—		Midnight Marauders
"Electric Relaxation"	1994	65	— (Note: "Electric Relaxation" did not enter the Dance Club Songs, but peaked at number 2 on the Dance Singles Sales.)	38	13	—	—	—	—	—	—	BPI: Silver; RMNZ: Gold	Midnight Marauders
"Oh My God" (featuring Busta Rhymes)	1994	— (Note: "Oh My God" did not enter the Billboard Hot 100, but peaked at number 2 on the Bubbling Under Hot 100.)	— (Note: "Oh My God" did not enter the Dance Club Songs, but peaked at number 2 on the Dance Singles Sales.)	69	15	—	—	—	—	—	81		Midnight Marauders
"1nce Again" (featuring Tammy Lucas)	1996	—	— (Note: "1nce Again/Stressed Out" did not enter the Dance Club Songs, but peaked at number 3 on the Dance Singles Sales.)	38	—	—	—	—	36	70	34		Beats, Rhymes and Life
"Stressed Out" (featuring Faith Evans)	1996	— (Note: "Stressed Out" did not enter the Billboard Hot 100, but peaked at number 8 on the Bubbling Under Hot 100.)	—	56	15	143	—	—	—	81	33		Beats, Rhymes and Life
"Find a Way"	1998	71	—	29	18	182	—	—	48	75	41		The Love Movement
"1nce Again (Twister Mix)" (as A Tribe Called Quest vs. Aphrodite; featuring Tammy Lucas)	1999	—	— (Note: "1nce Again (Twister Mix)" did not enter the Dance Club Songs, but peaked at number 30 on the Dance Singles Sales.)	—	—	—	—	—	—	—	—		Old School vs. New School
"We the People...."	2016	77	—	31	23	—	77	—	—	—	—		We Got It from Here... Thank You 4 Your Service
"—" denotes releases that did not chart or were not released. "*" indicates a chart that did not exist at the time.

=== As featured artist ===
List of singles as lead artist, with selected chart positions, showing year released and album name
Title	Year	Peak chart positions								Certifications	Album
Title	Year	US R&B	AUS	BEL	NED	NZ	SCO	UK	UK R&B	Certifications	Album
"Doin' Our Own Dang" (Jungle Brothers feat. A Tribe Called Quest, De La Soul, Monie Love & Queen Latifah)	1990	—	—	40	33	Done by the Forces of Nature					
"Rumble in the Jungle" ^{A} (Fugees feat. A Tribe Called Quest, Busta Rhymes & John Forté)	1997	71	3	—	3	When We Were Kings soundtrack					
"I C U (Doin' It)" (Violator feat. A Tribe Called Quest & Erykah Badu)	2003	—	—	—	—	non-album single					

^{A} Did not chart on the Hot 100 or Hot R&B/Hip-Hop charts (Billboard rules at the time prevented album cuts from charting). Chart peak listed here represents Hot 100 Airplay and Hot R&B/Hip-Hop Airplay charts data.

=== Promotional singles ===
List of singles, showing year released and album name
Title	Year	Album
"Like It Like That"	1998	The Love Movement
"Rock Rock Ya'll" (featuring Punchline, Jane Doe, Wordsworth & Mos Def)	1998	The Love Movement

== Other charted songs ==
Title	Year	Peak chart positions		Album
Title	Year	US	US R&B	Album
"The Space Program"	2016	— (Note: "The Space Program" did not enter the Billboard Hot 100, but peaked at number 25 on the Bubbling Under Hot 100 Singles chart.)	— (Note: "The Space Program" did not enter the Hot R&B/Hip-Hop Songs chart, but peaked at number two on the Bubbling Under R&B/Hip-Hop Singles chart.)	We Got It from Here... Thank You 4 Your Service

== Guest appearances ==
List of non-single guest appearances
Title	Year	Other performer(s)	Album
"What Yo Life Can Truly Be"	1991	De La Soul, Dres	A Roller Skating Jam Named "Saturdays" (VLS)
"Sh.Fe.Mc's"	1994	De La Soul	Clear Lake Audiotorium (EP)
"If the Papes Come"	1994	—N/a	Mi Vida Loca (Original Motion Picture Soundtrack)
"Glamour and Glitz"	1995	—N/a	The Show: The Soundtrack
"Peace, Prosperity & Paper"	1996	—N/a	High School High (soundtrack)
"The Remedy"	1996	Common	Get on the Bus: Music from and Inspired by the Motion Picture
"Wild Hot"	1997	Busta Rhymes	Rhyme & Reason (soundtrack)
"Same Ol' Thing"	1997	—N/a	Men in Black: The Album
"That Shit"	1998	Jay Dee	The Mix Tape, Vol. III
