= We the People.... (song) =

Single by A Tribe Called Quest

from the album We Got It from Here... Thank You 4 Your Service
- Released: November 17, 2016
- Genre: Alternative hip-hop; political hip-hop
- Length: 2:52
- Label: Epic
- Songwriters: Kamaal Fareed; Malik Taylor; Terrance Butler; Anthony Iommi; John Osbourne; William Ward
- Producers: Q-Tip; Blair Wells (co.)

A Tribe Called Quest singles chronology
"Like It Like That" (1998)	"We the People...." (2016)	"Dis Generation" (2017)

Music video
- "We The People...." on YouTube

"We the People...." is a song by American hip-hop group A Tribe Called Quest, and the first single from their sixth and final album, We Got It from Here... Thank You 4 Your Service. Produced by Q-Tip and co-produced by Blair Wells, the song contains a sample of the drum break of "Behind the Wall of Sleep" by Black Sabbath. The name of the track refers to the first three words of the Preamble to the United States Constitution. The chorus of the politically-charged song parodies Donald Trump's presidential campaign. "We the People...." was critically acclaimed and included on several year-end lists by publications.

== Background ==
On November 13, 2015, A Tribe Called Quest reunited and performed on The Tonight Show Starring Jimmy Fallon, on the same night of the Paris attacks. Inspired by the energy of their performance, the group members put aside their differences and began recording a new album, We Got It from Here... Thank You 4 Your Service, shortly thereafter. "We the People...." was one of the first songs recorded for the album, as it featured a verse from group member Phife Dawg, who died on March 22, 2016, before the album's completion.

== Critical reception ==
Jayson Greene of Pitchfork called the song "a ferocious and driving song about intolerance and fear," adding that it "simply put, is a sliver-sized miracle, a crack of light illuminating the door in a dark wall. This is the function Tribe songs have always served—they point to a path through wilderness." Gil Kaufman of Billboard praised the song, noting that it "instantly became the national anthem of the anti-Trump nation."

At the end of 2016, Slant Magazine named it the best single of the year, while The Village Voice ranked it fifth in their annual Pazz & Jop critics poll. Billboard ranked it the 10th best song of the year, while Pitchfork ranked it 11th, Consequence of Sound ranked it 25th, and NPR ranked it 34th.

== Music video ==
The music video was directed by James Larese. It begins with several people running through the streets of Greenpoint, Brooklyn at a waterfront building, as Q-Tip performs his verse, standing in front of more than a dozen microphones. He is joined by Jarobi White, Ali Shaheed Muhammad (who appears on a TV screen), Busta Rhymes, and Consequence. Before Phife Dawg's verse begins, a mural of his face is shown on the side of a building; the mural becomes animated throughout his verse. The video ends with hundreds of people gathered in a city square, surrounded by many signs reading "We the People."

== Charts ==
Chart (2016)	Peak position
Canada Hot 100 (Billboard)	77
US Billboard Hot 100	77
US Hot R&B/Hip-Hop Songs (Billboard)	31
US Hot Rap Songs (Billboard)	23

== See also ==
- Preamble to the United States Constitution
