= Q-Tip discography =

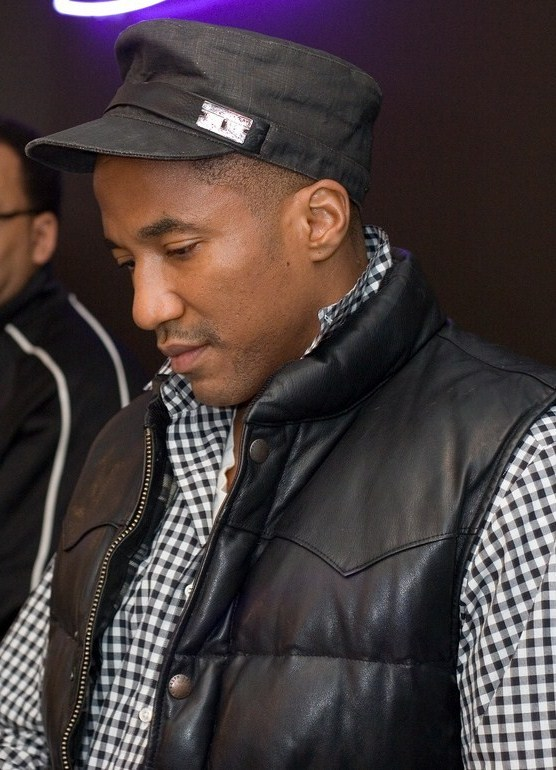
- Q-Tip in Washington D.C. in 2008.
- Studio albums: 3
- Singles: 9
- Music videos: 8

This is the solo discography of Q-Tip, an American hip hop musician, record producer, and DJ.

== Albums ==
See also: A Tribe Called Quest discography

=== Studio albums ===
List of albums, with selected chart positions and certifications
Title	Album details	Peak chart positions				Certifications
Title	Album details	US	US R&B	US Rap	UK	Certifications
Amplified	Released: November 23, 1999; Label: Arista; Format: CD, LP, cassette, digital download	28	4	—	88	RIAA: Gold; BPI: Silver
The Renaissance	Released: November 4, 2008; Label: Universal Motown; Format: CD, LP, digital download	11	3	2	112	
Kamaal the Abstract	Released: September 15, 2009; Label: Battery, Jive; Format: CD, LP, digital download	77	32	17	—	
"—" denotes a recording that did not chart or was not released in that territory.

=== Mixtapes ===
List of mixtapes, with year released
Title	Album details
The Abstract and the Dragon (with Busta Rhymes)	Released: December 12, 2013; Label: Self-released; Format: Digital download

== Singles ==
=== As lead artist ===
List of singles, with selected chart positions, showing year released and album name
Title	Year	Peak chart positions							Certifications	Album
Title	Year	US	US R&B	US Rap	CAN	IRE	NL	UK	Certifications	Album
"Get Involved" (with Raphael Saadiq)	1999	67	21	—	—	—	—	36		The PJs (soundtrack)
"Vivrant Thing"	1999	26	7	10	20	—	—	39		Violator: The Album/ Amplified
"Breathe and Stop"	2000	71	21	—	—	18	76	12		Amplified
"Things U Do"	2000	—	—	—	—	—	—	—		Amplified
"What Lies Beneath" (Note: "What Lies Beneath" was released as a split single with "Freak Daddy" by Mos Def.)	2002	—	—	—	—	—	—	—		Soundbombing III
"For the Nasty" (featuring Busta Rhymes)	2005	—	86	—	—	—	—	—		non-album single
"Work It Out"	2007	—	—	—	—	—	—	—		non-album single
"Gettin' Up"	2008	—	107	—	—	—	—	—		The Renaissance
"Move"	2008	—	—	—	—	—	—	—		The Renaissance
"A Little Party Never Killed Nobody (All We Got)" (with Fergie and GoonRock)	2013	77	—	—	72	89	—	90	RIAA: Platinum; BPI: Silver; BVMI: Platinum; RMNZ: Platinum; GLF: Platinum	The Great Gatsby (soundtrack)
"Don't Go Breaking My Heart" (featuring Demi Lovato)	2018	—	—	—	—	—	—	—		Revamp: Reimagining the Songs of Elton John & Bernie Taupin
"—" denotes a recording that did not chart or was not released in that territory.

=== As featured artist ===
List of singles as featured artist, with selected chart positions, showing year released and album name
Title	Year	Peak chart positions								Certifications	Album
Title	Year	US	US Dance	US R&B	US Rap	CAN	IRE	NL	UK	Certifications	Album
"Black Is Black" (Jungle Brothers featuring Q-Tip)	1989	—	—	—	—	—	—	—	72		Straight Out the Jungle
"Buddy" (De La Soul featuring Q-Tip, Queen Latifah, Monie Love & Jungle Brothers)	1989	—	27	18	2	—	—	—	7		3 Feet High and Rising
"Groove Is in the Heart" (Deee-Lite featuring Q-Tip [uncredited])	1990	4	—	28	—	15	8	10	2	RIAA: Gold; BPI: Silver	World Clique
"A Roller-Skating Jam Named 'Saturdays'" (De La Soul featuring Q-Tip)	1991		—								De La Soul Is Dead
"Got 'til It's Gone" (Janet Jackson featuring Q-Tip and Joni Mitchell)	1997	—	—	—	—	19	16	9	6	ARIA: Gold; BPI: Silver; RMNZ: Gold; SNEP: Gold	The Velvet Rope
"Body Rock"(Mos Def, Q-Tip and Tash)	1998	—	—	—	—	—	—	—	—		Lyricist Lounge, Volume One
"Hot Boyz" (Missy Elliott featuring Lil' Mo, Nas, Eve and Q-Tip)	1999	5	—	1	1	—	—	78	18	RIAA: Platinum	Da Real World
"You" (Lucy Pearl featuring Snoop Dogg and Q-Tip)	2001	—	—	64	—	—	—	—	—		Lucy Pearl
"Dem Thangs" (Angie Martinez featuring Q-Tip)	2001	—	—	—	—	—	—	—	—		Up Close and Personal
"Galvanize" (The Chemical Brothers featuring Q-Tip)	2005	—	—	—	—	—	6	11	3	BPI: Silver	Push the Button
"Enuff" (DJ Shadow featuring Lateef the Truthspeaker and Q-Tip)	2006	—	—	—	—	—	—	—	—		The Outsider
"Bang Bang Bang" (Mark Ronson featuring Q-Tip and MNDR)	2010	—	—	—	—	—	18	68	6	BPI: Silver	Record Collection
"Nakamarra" (Hiatus Kaiyote featuring Q-Tip)	2012	—	—	—	—	—	—	—	—		Tawk Tomahawk
"Thank You" (Busta Rhymes featuring Lil Wayne, Q-Tip and Kanye West)	2013	—	—	57	—	—	87	—	13	BPI: Silver	non-album single
"Meltdown" (Stromae featuring Lorde, Pusha T, Q-Tip and HAIM)	2014	—	—	—	—	—	—	—	—		The Hunger Games: Mockingjay, Part 1 – Original Motion Picture (soundtrack)
"Go" (The Chemical Brothers featuring Q-Tip [uncredited])	2015	—	—	—	—	—	76	—	4	BPI: Platinum; FIMI: Gold	Born in the Echoes
"New Breed"(James BKS, Idris Elba, Little Simz)	2019	—	—	—	—	—	—	—	—		Non-album single
"Hi-De-Ho" (Jack White featuring Q-Tip)	2022	—	—	—	—	—	—	—	—		Fear of the Dawn
"—" denotes a recording that did not chart or was not released in that territory.

=== Promotional singles ===
List of promotional singles showing year released and album name
Title	Year	Album
"Ill Vibe" (Busta Rhymes featuring Q-Tip)	1996	The Coming

== Guest appearances ==
List of non-single guest appearances, with other performing artists, showing year released and album name
Title	Year	Other artist(s)	Album
"The Promo"	1988	Jungle Brothers	Straight out the Jungle
"Promo No. 2 (Mind Review '89)"	1989	Jungle Brothers	Beyond This World 12"
"Don't Curse"	1991	Heavy D, Big Daddy Kane, Kool G Rap, Grand Puba, CL Smooth, Pete Rock	Peaceful Journey
"La Menage"	1991	Black Sheep	A Wolf in Sheep's Clothing
"Come on Down"	1991	Big Daddy Kane, Busta Rhymes	Prince of Darkness
"Who Planned It"	1993	Tiger	Claws of the Cat
"The Undisputed Champs"	1993	Del the Funky Homosapien	Wrong Place
"On the Road Again (My Jimmy Weighs a Ton) [Q-Tip Remix]"	1993	Jungle Brothers	—N/a
"Come on Everybody"	1993	Run–D.M.C.	Down with the King
"One Love"	1994	Nas	Illmatic
"Get It Together"	1994	Beastie Boys	Ill Communication
"Let's Organize"	1994	Organized Konfusion	Stress: The Extinction Agenda
"Get Down (Q-Tip Remix)"	1994	Craig Mack	—N/a
"Freestyle"	1995	Funkmaster Flex	The Mix Tape, Volume 1: 60 Minutes of Funk
"Drink Away the Pain (Situations)"	1995	Mobb Deep	The Infamous
"All the Way Live"	1995	Tha Alkaholiks	Coast II Coast
"To Each His Own"	1995	InI, Large Professor	The Life I Live
"Extra Abstract Skillz"	1996	Mad Skillz, Large Professor	From Where???
"Me and My Microphone"	1996	A+	The Latch-Key Child
"Flashlight (Groovemaster's Mix)"	1996	George Clinton, Busta Rhymes, ODB	Greatest Funkin' Hits
"3 MCs"	1996	Da Bush Babees	Gravity
"Ital (The Universal Side)"	1996	The Roots	Illadelph Halflife
"How Ya Want It We Got It (Native Tongues Mix)"	1997	Jungle Brothers, De La Soul	Raw Deluxe
"I Am the Black Gold of the Sun (MAW Remix)"	1997	Nu Yorican Soul	—N/a
"Original Man"	1997	Capleton	I Testament
"Stolen Moments Pt. III"	1997	Common	One Day It'll All Make Sense
"Who's That, Quienes"	1997	Boricua Guerrero	First Combat
"Sometimes (Ummah Remix)"	1997	Brand New Heavies	Shelter
"Let Me Be the One (Ummah Remix)"	1997	Mint Condition	—N/a
"Hey"	1998	—N/a	Slam (soundtrack)
"Show Down"	1998	Black Moon	The Mix Tape Volume III: 60 Minutes of Funk / War Zone
"To the Beat"	1999	Rahzel	Make the Music 2000
"Listen"	1999	Heavy D	Heavy
"The Greatest Romance Ever Sold" (Remix)	1999	Prince, Pharrell	—N/a
"Mr. Nigga"	1999	Mos Def	Black on Both Sides
"Make It All Better"	1999	Black Star	Amadou Project - Price of Freedom
"The Fear in the Heart of a Man"	2000	Tupac Shakur	The Rose That Grew from Concrete
"Hold Tight"	2000	Slum Village	Fantastic, Vol. 2
"Pork Pie Hat / Where Can Man Find Peace"	2000	Andy Summers	Peggy's Blue Skylight
"Makin' It Blend"	2000	Wordsworth	Lyricist Lounge 2
"Girls, Girls, Girls" (background vocals)	2001	Jay-Z, Slick Rick, Biz Markie	The Blueprint
"In the Sun"	2002	Large Professor	1st Class
"Come Close (Remix) [Closer]"	2002	Common, Erykah Badu, Pharrell	—N/a
"Poetry"	2003	The RH Factor	Hardgroove
"1, 2, to the Bass"	2003	Stanley Clarke	1, 2, to the Bass
"Tomorrow"	2003	Mark Ronson	Here Comes the Fuzz
"She Wants to Move" (Native Tongues Remix)	2004	N.E.R.D., Common, Mos Def, De La Soul	—N/a
"The Outsiders"	2004	R.E.M.	Around the Sun
"We Can Make It Better"	2005	Kanye West	Late Registration (UK Version)
"So What the Fuss" (Remix)	2005	Stevie Wonder	—N/a
"Like That"	2005	The Black Eyed Peas, Talib Kweli, CeeLo Green, John Legend	Monkey Business
"The Frog"	2006	Sérgio Mendes	Timeless
"Get You Some"	2006	Busta Rhymes	The Big Bang
"You Can't Hold a Torch"	2006	Busta Rhymes	The Big Bang
"Keep It Moving"	2006	Hi-Tek	Hi-Teknology 2: The Chip
"Love You Can't Borrow"	2006	M-1	Confidential
"Just a Lil Dude"	2007	RZA	Afro Samurai (soundtrack)
"Stop, Look, Listen"	2007	Statik Selektah, Styles P, Termanology	Spell My Name Right: The Album
"Lightworks"	2007	J Dilla, Busta Rhymes, Talib Kweli	Dillagence
"Too Blessed"	2007	Kevin Michael	Kevin Michael
"40 MCs"	2007	Amanda Diva	Life Experience
"Sandcastle Disco"	2008	Solange	Sol-Angel and the Hadley St. Dreams
"Wanna Go Back"	2008	Solange, Marsha Ambrosius	Sol-Angel and the Hadley St. Dreams
"Paris, Tokyo" (Remix)	2008	Lupe Fiasco, Pharrell, Sarah Green	—N/a
"Evolution of a Man"	2008	Al Kapone	Cadillac Records: Music from the Motion Picture
"Chocolate Box"	2009	Prince	MPLSoUND
"Good to Go"	2009	Grand Puba	Retroactive
"Hope You're Happy"	2009	Blakroc, Billy Danze, Nicole Wray	Blakroc
"Shine All Day"	2009	Grandmaster Flash, Jumz, Kel Spencer	The Bridge (Concept of a Culture)
"Here We Go"	2010	Chiddy Bang	Chiddy Bang: The Preview
"Betcha Wouldn´t Hurt Me"	2010	Quincy Jones, Mary J. Blige, Alfredo Rodríguez	Q Soul Bossa Nostra
"Birds of a Feather"	2010	Trugoy Dove, Mike Gee	From the Black Pool of Genius
"The Invitation"	2011	Saigon, Fatman Scoop	The Greatest Story Never Told
"Beautiful"	2011	Math Hoffa	A.C.M.D.3
"Poetic Justice" (Remix)	2012	Busta Rhymes	Catastrophic
"I'm Just Tryna Survive in the Big City"	2015	Dam-Funk	Invite the Light
"Circles"	2015	The Game, Eric Bellinger, Sha Sha	The Documentary 2
"No Matter What"	2016	Consequence	A Good Comeback Story
"Borderline (An Ode to Self Care)"	2016	Solange	A Seat at the Table
"Cheers"	2018	Anderson Paak	Oxnard
"Congo"	2018	Roc Marciano	Behold a Dark Horse
"Combat"	2019	Danny Brown, Consequence	U Know What I'm Sayin?
"Hit Man"	2019	Gang Starr	One of the Best Yet
"Yah Yah"	2020	Eminem, Royce da 5'9", Black Thought, Denaun	Music to Be Murdered By
"Don't Go"	2020	Busta Rhymes	Extinction Level Event 2: The Wrath of God
"More Life"	2021	Cordae	Just Until...
"Borough of Queens (Q.U.)"	2021	Large Pro & Neek the Exotic	Xtraexotic
"Meditate"	2021	Dame D.O.L.L.A.	Different on Levels the Lord Allowed
"Dear Dilla (Reprise)"	2022	Phife Dawg	Forever
"Why We Speak"	2023	Robert Glasper, Esperanza Spalding	Black Radio III
"One for Biz"	2023	Talib Kweli & Madlib	Liberation 2
"Kick Back Relax"	2024	MC Lyte	1 of 1
"Day in the Sun (Gettin' Wit U)"	2025	De La Soul, Yummy Bingham	Cabin in the Sky

== Music videos ==
Year	Title	Director(s)
1989	"Buddy" (De La Soul featuring Native Tongues)	
1989	"Doin' Our Own Dang" (Jungle Brothers featuring Native Tongues)	
1990	"Groove Is in the Heart" Dee-Lite featuring Q-Tip	
1991	"A Rollerskating Jam Named Saturdays" De Le Soul featuring Q-Tip	
1991	"Don't Curse" Heavy D featuring Q-Tip, Pete Rock and C.L. Smooth, Grand Puba & Kool G Rap	
1993	"Who Planned It" Tiger featuring Q-Tip	
1997	"Sometimes (Ummah Remix)" The Brand New Heavies featuring Q-Tip	
1997	"Got Till It's Gone" Janet Jackson featuring Q-TIp & Joni Mitchell	
1998	"Body Rock" Tash, Q-TIp & Mos Def	
1999	"Get Involved" Raphael Saadiq & Q-Tip	
1999	"Vivrant Thing"	Hype Williams
2000	"Breathe and Stop"	Hype Williams
2000	"Let's Ride"	Stéphane Sednaoui
2001	"Dem Thangz" Angie Martinez featuring Q-Tip	
2001	"You" Lucy Pearl featuring Q-Tip & Snoop Dogg	
2005	"Galvanize" Chemical Brothers featuring Q-Tip	
2006	"Like That" Black Eyed Peas featuring Q-Tip, Talib Kweli, CeeLo & John Legend	
2006	"Enuff" DJ Shadow featuring Q-Tip & Lateef the Truthspeaker	
2008	"Gettin' Up"	Ben Dickinson
2008	"Move"	Rik Cordero
2008	"Renaissance Rap"	Rik Cordero
2009	"Manwomanboogie"	Rik Cordero
2009	"Life Is Better"	Goodtimes
2009	"Chocolate Box" Prince featuring Q-Tip	
2011	"Bang Bang Bang" Mark Ronson featuring Q-Tip	
2013	"Thank You" Busta Rhymes featuring Q-Tip, Kanye & Lil Wayne	
2013	"A Little Party [Never Killed Nobody]" Fergie, Q-Tip & GoonRock	
2015	"Go" Chemical Brothers featuring Q-Tip	
2018	"Don't Go [Breaking My Heart]" Demi Lovato & Q-Tip	
2019	"New Breed" James BKS featuring Idris Elba & Q-Tip	
2021	"More Life" Cordae featuring Q-Tip	

== See also ==
- Q-Tip production discography
- A Tribe Called Quest discography
- The Ummah discography
