= The Space Program (song) =

Song by A Tribe Called Quest

from the album We Got It from Here... Thank You 4 Your Service
- Released: November 11, 2016
- Genre: Alternative hip hop; political hip hop; jazz rap
- Length: 5:40
- Label: Epic
- Songwriters: Kamaal Fareed; Malik Taylor; Jarobi White
- Producers: Q-Tip; Blair Wells (co.)

"The Space Program" is a song by American hip hop group A Tribe Called Quest, from their sixth and final album, We Got It from Here... Thank You 4 Your Service. Produced by Q-Tip and co-produced by Blair Wells, it is the opening track on the album, and includes posthumous vocals by group member Phife Dawg, who recorded the song with the group before his death in March 2016. Praised as the "triumphant return of the Tribe", it is a political hip hop song that addresses gentrification and racism in the United States.

== Lyrics ==
Described as "a treatise on black unity", the song is a metaphor for gentrification. It begins with Q-Tip and Phife Dawg stating, "It's time to go left and not right", indicating the side of the political spectrum that the group supports. Next, Q-Tip and Phife Dawg start chanting the chorus in unison, encouraging the listener to "make something happen." After a short verse by Q-Tip, Jarobi White delivers a verse, followed by another short verse by Q-Tip. A longer verse is then delivered by Q-Tip, before Phife Dawg repeats the chorus for two minutes, followed by the outro. The song also contains vocal samples from the musical fantasy film, Willy Wonka and the Chocolate Factory, and the blaxploitation film, Willie Dynamite.

== Critical reception ==
Rob Sheffield of Rolling Stone hailed the song as "The triumphant return of the Tribe", and interpreted that the lyrics were "about the end of the world." Writing for Pitchfork, Kris Ex called the song "quintessential Tribe", also praising its "sooty bottom heavy warmness, the uncluttered arrangements and bright instrumentation."

At the end of 2016, Rolling Stone ranked it the 30th best song of the year, and in The Village Voice's annual Pazz & Jop critics poll, it was tied for 66th best song of the year.

== Short film ==
A short film for "The Space Program", directed by Warren Fu, debuted on Apple Music on March 29, 2018. Billed as A Tribe Called Quest's final video, it features cameo appearances by Erykah Badu, Black Thought, Vince Staples, Pharrell Williams, Common, Talib Kweli, Questlove, Anderson .Paak, Alicia Keys, Rosario Dawson, Ta-Nehisi Coates, Kelly Rowland, Doug E. Fresh, Consequence, Janelle Monáe, and Ladybug Mecca. Rodney Carmichael of NPR stated that the video "propels present-day phenomena — from the racially-charged displacement of inner-city gentrification to the police killings of unarmed African-Americans — into a grim Afrofuturist reality."

== Charts ==
Chart (2016)	Peak position
Billboard Bubbling Under Hot 100	25
Billboard Bubbling Under R&B/Hip-Hop Songs	2
