= 1994 Source Awards =

Music awards

The Source Awards
- Date: April 25, 1994
- Location: Paramount Theater (New York City, New York)
- Country: United States
- First award: 1994

Highlights
- Most awards: Dr. Dre (3)

The 1994 Source Awards was held at the Paramount Theater in New York City, New York on April 25, 1994.

== Winners and nominees ==
Winners are in bold text.

=== Artist of the Year (group) ===
- **A Tribe Called Quest**

=== Artist of the Year (solo) ===
- **Dr. Dre**

=== New Artist of the Year (group) ===
- **Wu-Tang Clan**

=== New Artist of the Year (solo) ===
- **Snoop Doggy Dogg**

=== Lyricist of the Year (group or solo) ===
- **Snoop Doggy Dogg**

=== Album of the Year ===
- **Dr. Dre – The Chronic**

=== Single of the Year ===
- **Wu-Tang Clan – "Method Man"**

=== Motion Picture Soundtrack of the Year ===
- **Menace II Society**

=== Acting Performance, Movie or TV ===
- **MC Eiht – Menace II Society**

=== R&B Artist of the Year ===
- **Mary J. Blige**

=== Producer of the Year ===
- **Dr. Dre**

=== Dancehall Artist of the Year ===
- **Buju Banton**

=== Live Performer of the Year (group or solo) ===
- **KRS-One**

=== Video of the Year ===
- **Ice Cube – "Check Yo Self"**

== Performances ==
- Onyx – "Throw Ya Gunz"
- Thug Life – "Out on Bail"
- Wu-Tang Clan – "C.R.E.A.M."
- Run DMC - "Sucker MC's"
