= A Tribe Called Quest =

American hip-hop group

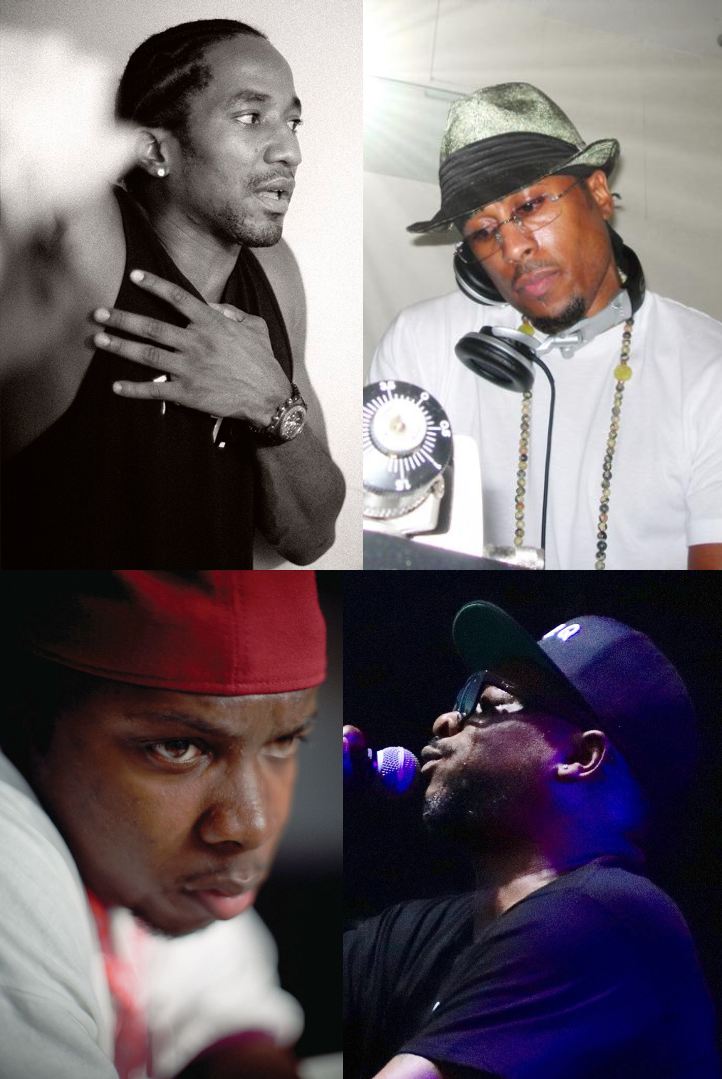
- From top to bottom, L–R: Q-Tip, Ali Shaheed Muhammad, Phife Dawg, and Jarobi White

Background information
- Also known as: Crush Connection (c. 1985); Quest (until 1988)
- Origin: Queens, New York City, U.S.
- Genres: East Coast hip-hop; jazz rap; alternative hip-hop; progressive rap
- Works: Discography
- Years active: 1985–1998; 2006–2013; 2015–2017
- Labels: Jive; Epic
- Past members: Q-Tip; Ali Shaheed Muhammad; Phife Dawg; Jarobi White
- Website: atribecalledquest.com

A Tribe Called Quest was an American hip-hop group formed in Queens, New York City, in 1985, originally composed of rapper and main producer Q-Tip, rapper Phife Dawg, DJ and co-producer Ali Shaheed Muhammad, and rapper Jarobi White. A Tribe Called Quest came to prominence as members of the Native Tongues collective, which they co-founded in 1988. Widely regarded as pioneers of alternative hip-hop and jazz rap, John Bush of AllMusic called them "the most intelligent, artistic rap group during the 1990s", and Kris Ex of Pitchfork regarded them as "one of the greatest acts that hip-hop has ever produced".

The group's debut album, People's Instinctive Travels and the Paths of Rhythm (1990), earned critical acclaim, receiving the first five 'mic' rating in The Source's history. Their jazz-infused follow-up, The Low End Theory (1991), helped shape 1990s alternative hip-hop, and was followed by the equally influential Midnight Marauders (1993). Beats, Rhymes and Life (1996), became their first Billboard 200 chart-topper. Their fifth album The Love Movement (1998), preceded their breakup. After reuniting in 2006 for sporadic tours, the group released its final album, We Got It from Here... Thank You 4 Your Service (2016), which topped the Billboard 200 and earned critical praise; it featured posthumous contributions from Phife Dawg, who died eight months before its release.

A Tribe Called Quest was the most commercially successful act in the Native Tongues, with all six of its albums certified either gold or platinum by the Recording Industry Association of America (RIAA). The group's influence transcends hip-hop, as they are credited with inspiring the neo soul genre. Their most notable songs include "Can I Kick It?", "Scenario", "Award Tour", "Electric Relaxation" and "Bonita Applebum", along with collaborations "Buddy" with De La Soul, Jungle Brothers, Monie Love and Queen Latifah, and "Rumble in the Jungle" with Fugees, Busta Rhymes and John Forte. They received the Founders Award at the 2005 Billboard R&B/Hip-Hop Awards, were honored at the 4th VH1 Hip Hop Honors, and won the 2017 Brit Award for International Group. A Tribe Called Quest was inducted into the Rock and Roll Hall of Fame in 2024.

== History ==
=== 1985–1990: Formation, Native Tongues, and People's Instinctive Travels ===
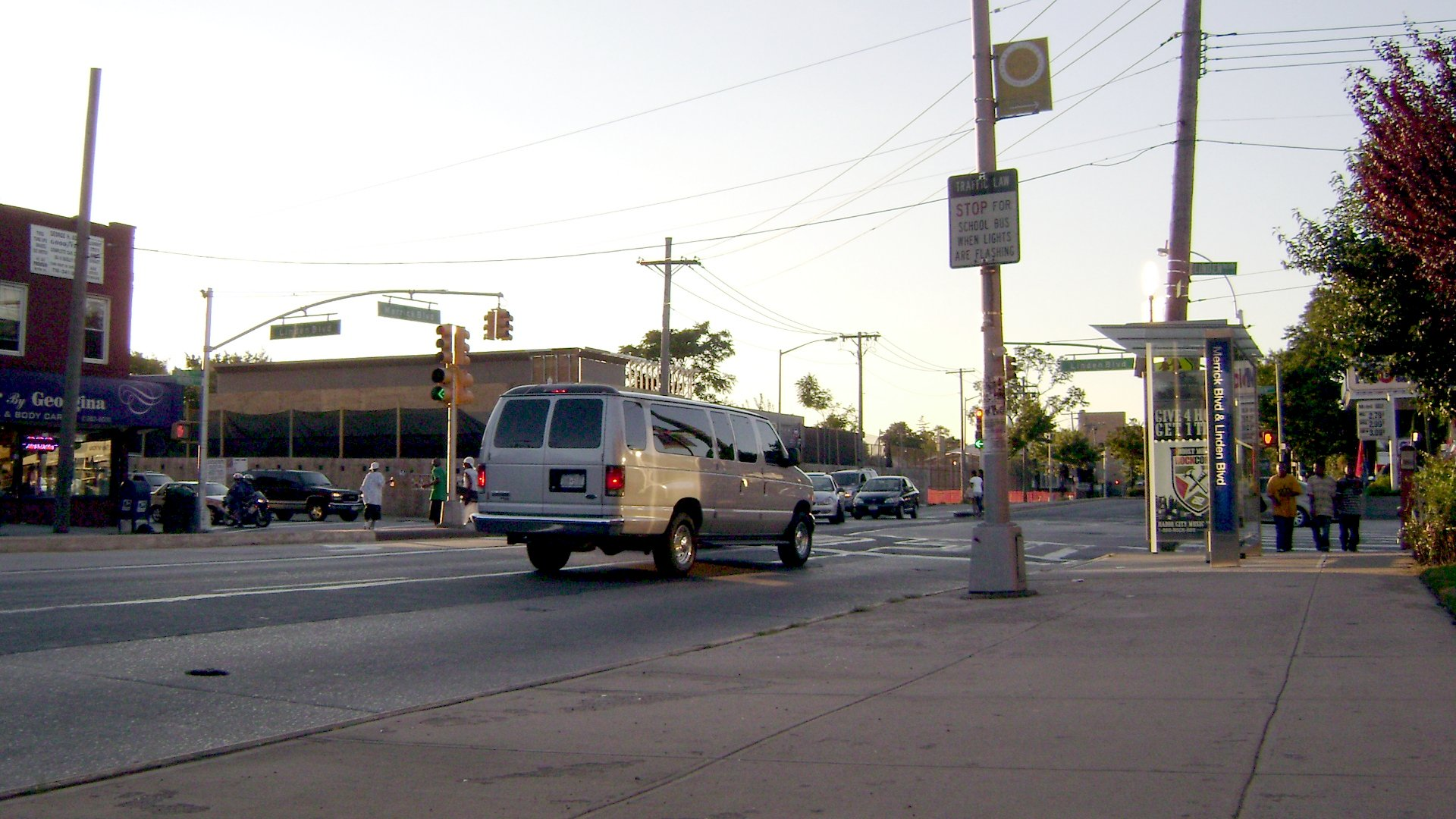
The neighborhood of St. Albans, Queens, where Q-Tip and Phife Dawg grew up together

Q-Tip (Kamaal Fareed) and Phife Dawg (Malik Taylor) were childhood friends who grew up together in the St. Albans neighbourhood of Queens, New York City. Initially, Q-Tip performed as a battle rapper, under the name MC Love Child, occasionally teaming up with Murry Bergtraum High School classmate Ali Shaheed Muhammad as a rapper and DJ duo. In 1985, the duo began making demos over Q-Tip's pause tape beats. Phife Dawg later joined them, though he didn't become a full member until neighbourhood friend Jarobi White joined; the group dubbed themselves "Crush Connection" and later "Quest". The group's final name, A Tribe Called Quest, was coined in 1988 by Jungle Brothers, who attended the same high school as Q-Tip and Muhammad; that year, Q-Tip made his first recorded appearances on Jungle Brothers' songs "Black Is Black" and "The Promo". Shortly after, A Tribe Called Quest, Jungle Brothers, De La Soul, Queen Latifah and Monie Love formed the Native Tongues collective, known for their like-minded Afrocentrism, positivity and eclectic sampling. In 1989, Phife Dawg made his first recorded appearance on the song "Buddy (Native Tongue Decision)", the remix of De La Soul's single "Buddy".

A Tribe Called Quest hired Kool DJ Red Alert as their first manager. In early 1989, the group signed a demo deal with Geffen Records and produced a five-song demo, which included future single "I Left My Wallet in El Segundo". Geffen decided against offering the group a recording contract, and the group was granted permission to shop for a deal elsewhere. After receiving lucrative offers for multi-album deals from a variety of labels, the group opted for a modest deal offered by Jive Records. Jive was then known as an independent rap label that partly owed its success to building the careers of artists Boogie Down Productions and Too Short. Later that year, the group released their first 12" single, "Description of a Fool".

Their debut album, People's Instinctive Travels and the Paths of Rhythm, released on April 17, 1990, was marked by a playful lyrical approach and light-hearted content such as safe sex, vegetarianism and youthful experiences. The music was an eclectic mix of jazz, funk, soul and rock samples. The album was met with critical acclaim; The Source rated it five mics, becoming the first album to receive the magazine's highest rating. NME's review stated that "This is not rap, it's near perfection." The album only gained momentum after the release of the singles "Bonita Applebum" and "Can I Kick It?", eventually achieving gold certification in 1996.

=== 1991–1993: The Low End Theory, Midnight Marauders, and commercial success ===
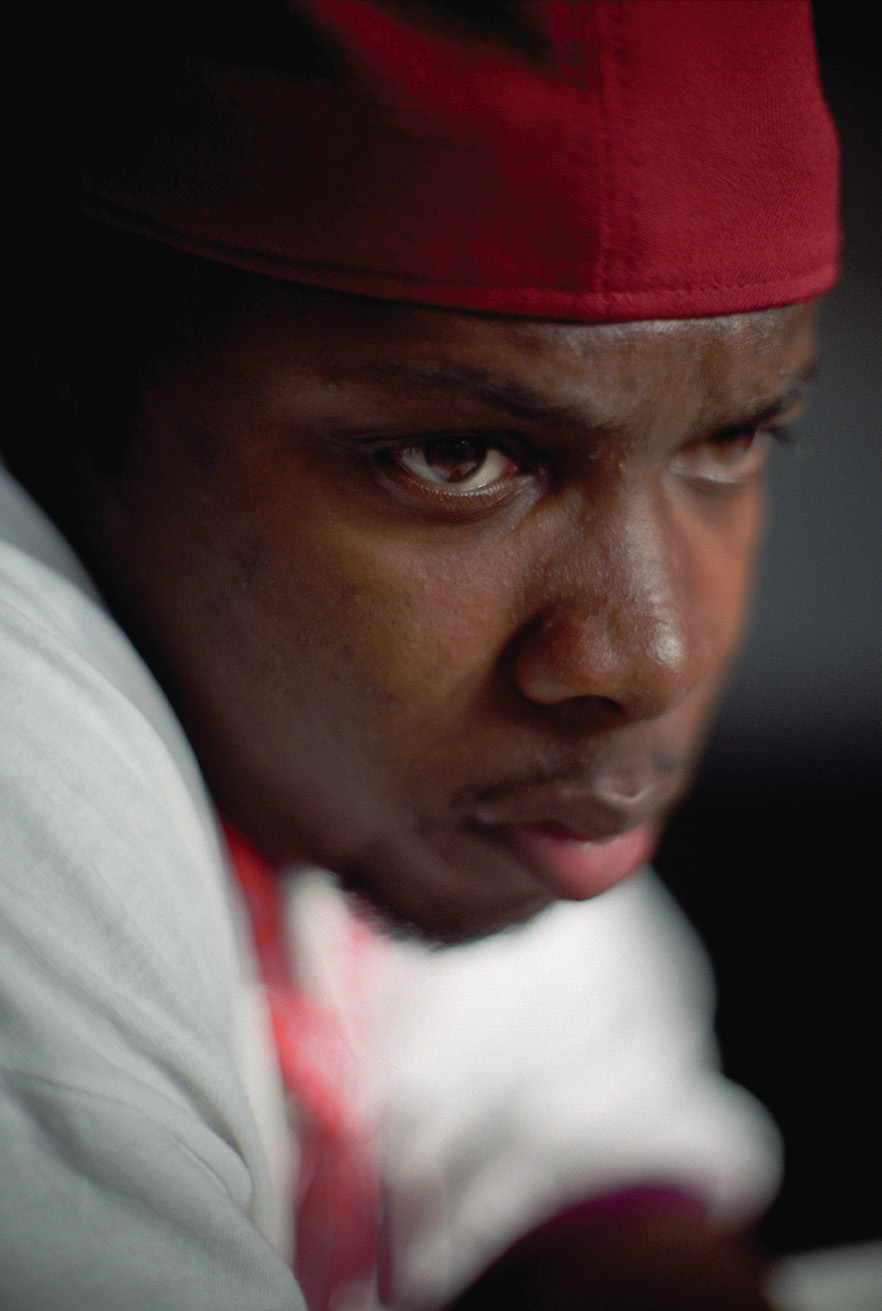
Phife Dawg's breakout performance on The Low End Theory marked the beginning of the group's successful run in the 1990s.

A Tribe Called Quest's second album, The Low End Theory, was released on September 24, 1991, with "Check the Rhime" as the lead single; the song largely established the lyrical interplay between Q-Tip and Phife Dawg. Until then, most of the group's songs had only featured vocals by Q-Tip, but Q-Tip encouraged Phife Dawg to increase his participation despite his recent diabetes diagnosis. Musically, the album fused hip-hop with the laid-back atmosphere of jazz, particularly bebop and hard bop, combined with a minimalist approach to production that stripped the sound down to vocals, drums and bass. Mixing engineer Bob Power played a major role on the album, as he was tasked with removing surface noise and static that is typically heard on hip-hop songs sampled from old vinyl records. During the recording sessions, White left the group to pursue a career in culinary arts, and they hired Chris Lighty as their new manager after signing to Rush Artist Management.

Lyrically, the group focused on a range of social issues, from date rape ("The Infamous Date Rape") to consumerism ("Skypager"), while also criticizing the hip-hop industry on several songs. Guests on the album included Leaders of the New School, Brand Nubian, Vinia Mojica and Ron Carter, who played double bass on the song "Verses from the Abstract". Additional singles included "Jazz (We've Got)" and "Scenario"; a live performance of "Scenario" with Leaders of the New School on The Arsenio Hall Show led to greater popularity. Leaders member Busta Rhymes attracted attention with his verse in the song, which led to him launching a successful solo career.

The Low End Theory received widespread acclaim from critics. The Source gave the group its second consecutive five mic rating, praising their "progressive sound" and "streetwise edge", also noting that "Those who questioned Phife's microphone techniques on the first album will swallow those doubts as he practically steals the show on this one." The album peaked at No. 45 on the Billboard 200 and was certified gold on February 19, 1992; it reached platinum status by 1995. In the aftermath of their success, the group contributed the song "Hot Sex" to the soundtrack for the film Boomerang in 1992.

Conrad Tillard, then known variously as the Hip Hop Minister and Conrad Muhammad, became a fixture in hip-hop in 1993 after he arranged a meeting and a truce in a feud between rising bands Wreckx-N-Effect and A Tribe Called Quest, that Tillard said threatened to turn Harlem into a "war zone".

A Tribe Called Quest released their third album, Midnight Marauders, on November 9, 1993. The lead single, "Award Tour", became the group's highest-charting single and helped to land the album at No. 8 on the Billboard 200. The production, still rooted in jazz, was a return to the eclectic sounds found on People's Instinctive Travels, with a more prominent funk influence, including grittier drums. The voice of a "tour guide", on the intro and at the end of several tracks, added further cohesion to the album.

Midnight Marauders saw improved lyrical interplay between Phife Dawg and Q-Tip, as evidenced on the singles "Electric Relaxation" and "Oh My God"; the popularity of "Electric Relaxation" led to it becoming the opening theme song for the sitcom The Wayans Bros., from 1995 to 1996. Topics on the album include police harassment ("Midnight"), religious faith ("God Lives Through"), hip-hop ("We Can Get Down") and use of the word nigga ("Sucka Nigga"). Guests on the album include Large Professor, Busta Rhymes and Raphael Saadiq (credited as Raphael Wiggins).

The album received widespread acclaim from critics. Entertainment Weekly called the album "as fresh as their first", while Melody Maker stated "A Tribe Called Quest have expanded their vision with a lyrical gravitas and a musical lightness of touch that has hitherto eluded them across a whole album". The album was ranked No. 21 by The Village Voice in that year's Pazz & Jop critics' poll. Midnight Marauders became A Tribe Called Quest's fastest-selling album; it was certified platinum on January 11, 1995, only 14 months after its release.

=== 1994–1995: Intermission and the Ummah ===
At the 1994 Source Awards, Tupac Shakur and his group Thug Life performed their song "Out on Bail", interrupting A Tribe Called Quest as they accepted the award for Group of the Year; it was later found that this apparent act of disrespect was accidental. That summer, the group performed as one of a handful of hip-hop acts on the Lollapalooza tour, among acts such as The Smashing Pumpkins, Stereolab and The Verve. While on tour, keyboardist Amp Fiddler introduced Q-Tip to a young producer from Detroit named Jay Dee. At the suggestion of Q-Tip, Jay Dee later joined him and Muhammad, forming a production unit known as The Ummah (Arabic for "the [worldwide] Muslim community"), in which each member produced songs individually and received a songwriting credit for their work. The Ummah handled the production of A Tribe Called Quest's next two albums.

During this period, group members contributed to several notable outside projects with production and guest verses. Phife Dawg, who rapped on "Oh My God" that he owned "more condoms than TLC", made an appearance on the song "Intro-lude" from that group's album, CrazySexyCool, in 1994. That year, Q-Tip produced the single "One Love" from Nas' debut album Illmatic and appeared on the song "Get It Together" by Beastie Boys, from their album Ill Communication. In 1995, Muhammad co-produced the single "Brown Sugar" from D'Angelo's debut album of the same name, and Q-Tip produced three songs for Mobb Deep while serving as a mixing engineer for their album The Infamous. The group contributed "Glamour and Glitz" to The Show: The Soundtrack that year, before returning the following year with their next album.

=== 1996–1998: Beats, Rhymes and Life, The Love Movement, and breakup ===
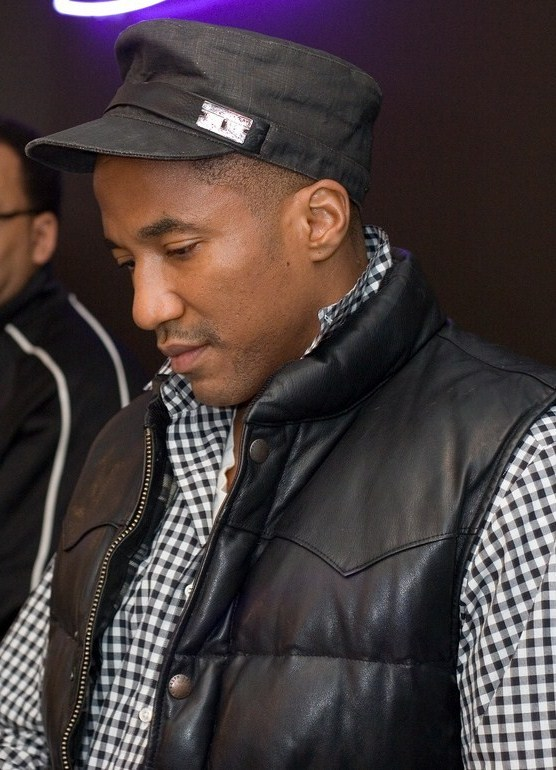
Q-Tip's conversion to Islam in the mid-1990s influenced the philosophical direction of the group's music on Beats, Rhymes and Life.

Beats, Rhymes and Life, the group's fourth album, was released on July 30, 1996, supported by the singles "1nce Again" and "Stressed Out". It was recorded during the turbulent East Coast–West Coast hip-hop rivalry, with the tracks "Get a Hold", "Keeping It Moving" and "Baby Phife's Return" referring to it. The Ummah's production style, a minimalist R&B and jazz-infused sound, was a departure from the group's previous albums. Jay Dee, a big fan of A Tribe Called Quest, contributed five beats to the album, including both singles. Lyrically, the album featured a less playful, more philosophical approach by the group. Consequence, Q-Tip's cousin, and an aspiring rapper, was present on six songs. Phife Dawg later stated that this period was when he began to lose interest in the group:

I really felt like with Midnight Marauders I came into my own. By the time when Beats, Rhymes and Life came out I started feelin' like I didn't fit in any more. Q-Tip and Ali had converted to Islam and I didn't. Music felt like a job; like I was just doin' it to pay bills. I never want my music to feel like just a job. They would schedule studio time at the last minute. I'd catch a plane from Atlanta to be in New York and when I got to the studio, no one would be there. They would have canceled the session without telling me. Seemed like the management was concerned with other folks not me. But I never lost my confidence.

The album debuted at No. 1 on the Billboard 200 and went gold before the end of the year; it was certified platinum in 1998. Critical reception was divided, but mostly positive; Rolling Stone called the album "near-flawless", while The Source awarded it four mics. Melody Maker felt that it provided "both their best and worst thus far". It was nominated for Best Rap Album and "1nce Again" was nominated for Best Rap Performance by a Duo or Group at the 1997 Grammy Awards.

In 1997, the group was featured on the Fugees single "Rumble in the Jungle", alongside Busta Rhymes and John Forté, from the When We Were Kings soundtrack. They also appeared on the soundtrack Men in Black: The Album, with the song "Same Ol' Thing". In Europe, they released The Jam EP, which included the aforementioned song, "Mardi Gras at Midnight" (featuring Rah Digga) and two songs from Beats, Rhymes and Life, "Get a Hold" and "Jam". That year also saw the first reunion of the three Native Tongues groups since 1989, when Jungle Brothers invited A Tribe Called Quest and De La Soul to guest on "How Ya Want It We Got It", a song from their album Raw Deluxe.

A month before The Love Movement was released on September 29, 1998, the group announced that it would be their final album. The group cited their frustration with Jive as a significant factor in the breakup. The album, which was centered on the theme of love, was promoted by the single "Find a Way", a song that "innocently wonders about the point at which friendship spills over into sex". Musically, the album saw the return of The Ummah's stripped-down production style from Beats, Rhymes and Life. Guest appearances by Busta Rhymes, Redman and Noreaga helped to balance the subdued tone of the album.

The Love Movement was certified gold on November 1, 1998, just over a month after its release. Critical reception was mostly positive; Rolling Stone remarked that "the mature, accomplished niceness of The Love Movement proves that the Tribe still have the skills – they're just short on thrills." The album was nominated for Best Rap Album at the 1999 Grammy Awards.

=== 1999–2005: Solo projects and brief return to recording ===
Under the management of Violator, Q-Tip launched a successful solo career, which saw two Billboard Hot 100 hits, "Vivrant Thing" and "Breathe and Stop", and the release of the gold-certified album Amplified in late 1999. The album featured production by Q-Tip, Jay Dee and DJ Scratch. Despite receiving mostly positive reviews, the album was criticized by the hip-hop community for its mainstream sound. The most notable of Q-Tip's critics was Phife Dawg, who took his former partner to task on his solo album Ventilation: Da LP, released in 2000. The Hi-Tek-produced lead single, "Flawless", contained the lines "Go 'head, play yourself with them ho-like hooks / sing ballads if it's all about the Maxwell look". Ventilation included production by Jay Dee and Pete Rock.

Teaming up with two other artists from former groups, Raphael Saadiq of Tony! Toni! Toné! and Dawn Robinson of En Vogue, Muhammad's next project was Lucy Pearl. The group scored two hit singles with "Dance Tonight" and "Don't Mess with My Man", from their self-titled album, which was certified gold a few months after its release in 2000. Following a dispute between Saadiq and Robinson, the latter left the group and was replaced by Joi; however, this new incarnation would only last for the remainder of touring.

In 2001, Q-Tip changed directions and recorded Kamaal the Abstract, an album which saw him in the role of singer and bandleader. Unlike his work with A Tribe Called Quest, or his previous solo work, Kamaal was constructed around live music and abstract song concepts. Arista Records refused to release the album, doubting its commercial potential, resulting in Q-Tip leaving the label. The following year, he recorded the song "What Lies Beneath" for the Soundbombing III compilation, in which he responded to Phife Dawg's comments on "Flawless".

In 2003, Q-Tip and Phife Dawg put aside their differences and A Tribe Called Quest briefly returned to the studio, recording the song "I C U (Doin' It)", featuring Erykah Badu. It was intended to be the first single from the Violator compilation, V3: The Good, The Bad & The Ugly, however, the album was not released. Undeterred by the shelving of Kamaal the Abstract, Q-Tip recorded Open in late 2003, planning to release it the next year. It featured contributions from André 3000, Common and D'Angelo. However, his label, DreamWorks Records, got bought out by Universal Music Group, which eventually led to Open also getting shelved.

On August 27, 2004, A Tribe Called Quest headlined the Street Scene music festival in San Diego. Muhammad focused on developing a stable of artists, most of whom were showcased on his debut solo album, Shaheedullah and Stereotypes, released later that year. In 2005, the group received the Founders Award at the Billboard R&B/Hip-Hop Awards in Atlanta.

=== 2006–2013: Reunion and touring ===
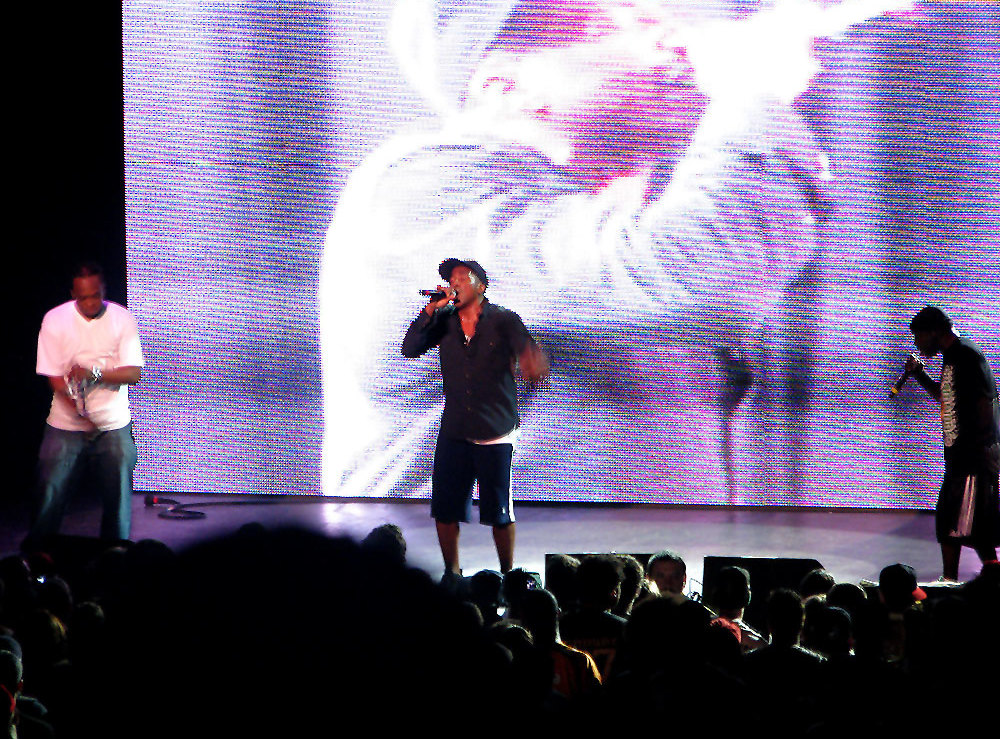
A Tribe Called Quest in 2009

In 2006, the group reunited as a touring band, in part, to help Phife Dawg with his mounting medical expenses. They co-headlined that year's Bumbershoot festival in Seattle and performed several sold-out concerts in the U.S., Canada and Japan. The group also appeared on the 2K Sports Bounce Tour, promoting the NBA 2K7 video game, with a Dan the Automator remix of their song "Lyrics to Go" appearing on the game's soundtrack. According to Phife Dawg at the time, A Tribe Called Quest planned to release an album, as they owed Jive one more in their six-album contract. Speaking about the possibility of a new album showing up that year, Phife Dawg said:

Man, we was only 18–19 when we first got started. [When] we broke up we were still like 28. Now we are 35–36. It'd be real different being in the studio. It would be real interesting to see where Q-Tip is. It would all be on a much higher level. But we are all into such different stuff from way back then. We'd need at least a solid month to work on something. Trying to get all of us together for that much time ... I don't see that happening.

In 2007, A Tribe Called Quest was honored at the 4th VH1 Hip Hop Honors, with a tribute performance by Busta Rhymes, Common, Lupe Fiasco and Pharrell Williams. The group was named the headlining act for the 2008 Rock the Bells tour. That year, Phife Dawg received a kidney transplant from his wife. In late 2008, Q-Tip released his long-awaited second album, The Renaissance, on Universal Motown Records. After being shelved for seven years, Kamaal the Abstract was finally released in 2009, on Battery Records.

The group co-headlined the 2010 Rock the Bells tour. Phife Dawg planned to release his follow-up album, Songs in the Key of Phife: Volume 1 (Cheryl's Big Son), that year; however, his health issues delayed the release of the album. The group was the subject of the 2011 documentary, Beats, Rhymes & Life: The Travels of A Tribe Called Quest, directed by Michael Rapaport. In 2012, Q-Tip signed to Kanye West's GOOD Music label and prepared the release of his new album, The Last Zulu, which later became heavily delayed. At the 2012 BET Hip Hop Awards, the group took part in a tribute performance for former manager Chris Lighty, who had recently died.

In 2013, the group performed at a handful of select festivals throughout the summer, including Yahoo! Wireless in London, Splash! in Germany, OpenAir Frauenfeld in Switzerland, and H2O Music Festival in Los Angeles. In November 2013, two of the four New York shows for West's Yeezus Tour featured A Tribe Called Quest as supporting acts. According to statements made by Q-Tip at the time, these were intended to be A Tribe Called Quest's final performances.

=== 2015–2017: We Got It from Here, death of Phife Dawg, and final tour ===
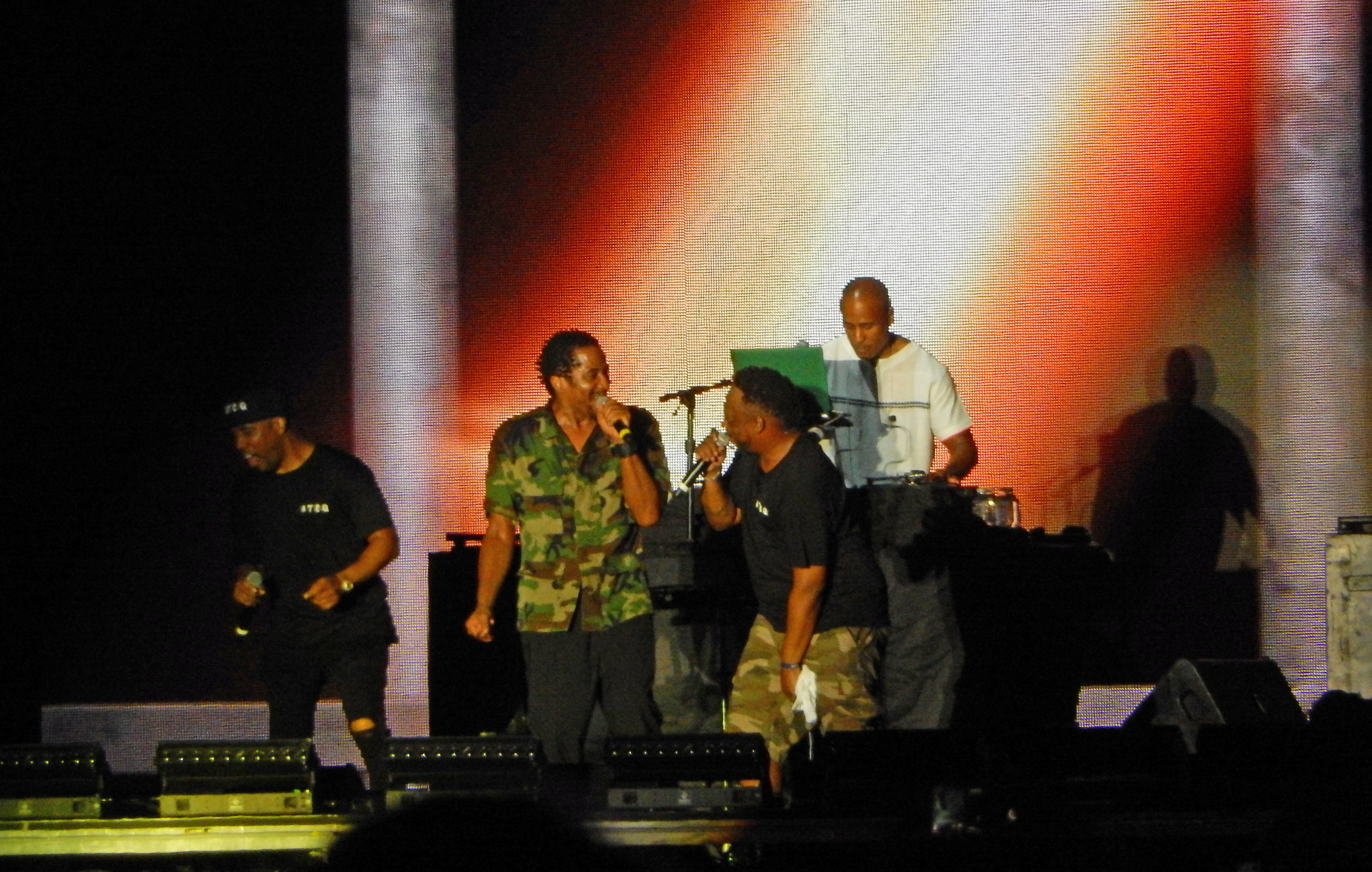
Members of A Tribe Called Quest performing on their final tour in 2017

On November 13, 2015, A Tribe Called Quest reunited to perform on The Tonight Show Starring Jimmy Fallon. That day, the group reissued People's Instinctive Travels and the Paths of Rhythm, in commemoration of its 25th anniversary. The reissue included remixes by Pharrell Williams, J. Cole and CeeLo Green. In addition, they participated in an AMA on Reddit, where users asked the group questions. On the night of their Tonight Show appearance, the same night of the terrorist attacks in Paris, the group felt "charged" and put aside their differences, deciding to record a new album, We Got It from Here... Thank You 4 Your Service, in secrecy. Muhammad was unable to attend recording sessions for the album, as he was producing the Luke Cage soundtrack with Adrian Younge at the time.

Phife Dawg died on March 22, 2016, due to complications relating to diabetes. The album was incomplete when Phife Dawg died, but the surviving members continued to work on it following his death. That August, Epic Records CEO L.A. Reid revealed that the label would be releasing a new A Tribe Called Quest album in the near future. We Got It from Here... Thank You 4 Your Service was subsequently announced in October, with a release date of November 11, 2016; it became the group's second album to debut at No. 1 on the Billboard 200. The day after its release, the group appeared on Saturday Night Live and performed in front of a mural of Phife Dawg.

We Got It from Here featured guest appearances by André 3000, Kendrick Lamar, Jack White, Elton John, Kanye West, Anderson .Paak, Talib Kweli, Consequence and Busta Rhymes. Promoted by the hit single "We the People....", which opposed Donald Trump's presidential campaign, the album received widespread acclaim from critics. Lyrically, Rolling Stone believed that the group "maintain the attitude of the Bohemian everydude funkonauts" that inspired many prominent hip-hop artists. AllMusic praised the album's "visionary and pleasingly weird production", which drew from several different genres and sample sources. Speaking with Billboard, Q-Tip revealed plans for the group to do a final world tour, to promote the album and honor Phife Dawg, before permanently disbanding. It was also announced that a new Phife Dawg solo album, Forever, mostly completed before his death, would be released in the near future; the album was released in 2022.

On February 12, 2017, A Tribe Called Quest performed alongside Anderson .Paak, Busta Rhymes and Consequence at the 59th Annual Grammy Awards. Later that month, the group won the award for best International Group at the 2017 Brit Awards. On May 22, 2017, We Got It from Here achieved gold certification, making all six of the group's albums RIAA-certified. The group performed at a number of festivals throughout the summer; they performed their final concert on September 9, 2017, at Bestival in Dorset, England. After disbanding, a short film for the album's opening track, "The Space Program", was released on March 29, 2018, and billed as the group's final video.

== Legacy ==
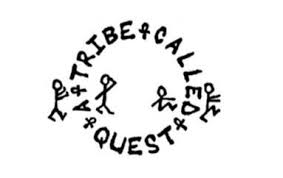
A Tribe Called Quest logo

AllMusic critic John Bush called A Tribe Called Quest "without question the most intelligent, artistic rap group during the 1990s", further stating that the group "jump-started and perfected the hip-hop alternative to hardcore and gangsta rap." At a time when James Brown drum breaks and P-Funk basslines dominated hip-hop production, the group successfully bridged the gap between jazz and hip-hop, incorporating bebop and hard bop samples and recording with double bassist Ron Carter. The group's production influenced their contemporaries, thus changing the sound of hip-hop; Dr. Dre produced his highly regarded debut The Chronic after being inspired by The Low End Theory, and Pete Rock stated, "There were times when I would walk into a record store and see Tip sitting on the floor with his glasses on, going through albums, looking for beats ... I was like, 'This guy is serious.' Being around [the group] made me step up and become even more serious than I was." Elton John regarded them as "the seminal hip-hop band of all-time".

Lyrically, A Tribe Called Quest has been regarded for addressing many social issues through Q-Tip's philosophical viewpoints and Phife Dawg's everyman perspectives. People's Instinctive Travels and the Paths of Rhythm influenced several notable hip-hop artists; Scarface asserted that it "really made me want to rap", and Pharrell Williams expressed that it was "the turning point [which] made me see that music was art." Kierna Mayo, former editor-in-chief of Ebony, said that The Low End Theory and Midnight Marauders "gave birth to neo-everything.... That entire class of D'Angelo, Erykah Badu, Maxwell, and Lauryn Hill—and moving on to André 3000, Kanye West, and Talib Kweli—everything that is left of everything begins with Tribe." The group has also been credited for helping launch the solo careers of Busta Rhymes, J Dilla and Consequence. The Roots drummer Ahmir Thompson's stage name "Questlove" was inspired by A Tribe Called Quest, whom he cited as his favorite group, stating, "They're my Beatles." The group's name serves as the inspiration for the name of electronic music group A Tribe Called Red, now known as The Halluci Nation.

In 2003, The Low End Theory was ranked 153rd on Rolling Stone's 500 Greatest Albums of All Time. In a revised 2020 list, its ranking moved up to 43rd, and Midnight Marauders was added to the list at 201st. The group's single "Can I Kick It?" was ranked 292nd on the 2021 revision of Rolling Stone's 500 Greatest Songs of All Time. In 2022, The Low End Theory was selected by the Library of Congress for preservation in the National Recording Registry. In 2024, A Tribe Called Quest was inducted into the Rock and Roll Hall of Fame.

== Members ==
- Q-Tip – vocals, production (1985–1998, 2006–2013, 2015–2017)
- Phife Dawg – vocals (1985–1998, 2006–2013, 2015–2016; died 2016)
- Ali Shaheed Muhammad – turntables, co-production (1985–1998, 2006–2013, 2015–2017)
- Jarobi White – vocals (1985–1991, 2006–2013, 2015–2017)

== Discography ==
Studio albums

- People's Instinctive Travels and the Paths of Rhythm (1990)
- The Low End Theory (1991)
- Midnight Marauders (1993)
- Beats, Rhymes and Life (1996)
- The Love Movement (1998)
- We Got It from Here... Thank You 4 Your Service (2016)

== Awards and nominations ==
=== Billboard R&B/Hip-Hop Awards ===
Year	Nominee / work	Award	Result
2005	A Tribe Called Quest	Founders Award	Won

=== Brit Awards ===
Year	Nominee / work	Award	Result
2017	A Tribe Called Quest	International Group	Won

=== Grammy Awards ===
Year	Nominee / work	Award	Result
1997	Beats, Rhymes and Life	Best Rap Album	Nominated
1997	"1nce Again"	Best Rap Performance by a Duo or Group	Nominated
1999	The Love Movement	Best Rap Album	Nominated
2012	Beats, Rhymes & Life: The Travels of A Tribe Called Quest	Best Long Form Music Video	Nominated

=== Rock and Roll Hall of Fame ===
Year	Nominee / work	Award	Result
2022	Performer	Rock and Roll Hall of Fame	Nominated
2023	Performer	Rock and Roll Hall of Fame	Nominated
2024	Performer	Rock and Roll Hall of Fame	Inducted

=== The Source Awards ===
Year	Nominee / work	Award	Result
1994	A Tribe Called Quest	Group of the Year	Won

== Filmography ==
- Beats, Rhymes & Life: The Travels of A Tribe Called Quest (2011)

== Apparel collaborations ==
- In celebration of People's Instinctive Travels' 25th anniversary in 2015, Stüssy worked with A Tribe Called Quest to create a line featuring hats, sweaters and t-shirts of classic photos, lyrics and their iconic logo.
- Teaming up with longtime collaborator Pharrell Williams, the group partnered with Billionaire Boys Club to make "The Space Program" capsule in 2018.
- Paying tribute to the rap group, Vans made a line of footwear in 2018, in honor of their album artwork and lyrics.
- In 2022, Peloton announced a collaboration with A Tribe Called Quest, which included a line of apparel.
- In 2009, Jordan Brand released ATCQ Jordan 1 special colorway, this sneaker gets its inspiration from A Tribe Called Quest's cover art from the album Midnight Marauders.
