= We Got It from Here... Thank You 4 Your Service =

Studio album by A Tribe Called Quest
- Released: November 11, 2016
- Recorded: November 2015 – October 2016
- Studio: The AbLab in New Jersey
- Genres: East Coast hip-hop; jazz rap
- Length: 60:20
- Label: Epic
- Producers: A Tribe Called Quest (exec.); Q-Tip; Blair Wells (co.)

A Tribe Called Quest chronology
The Love Movement (1998)	We Got It from Here... Thank You 4 Your Service (2016)

Singles from We Got It from Here... Thank You 4 Your Service
- 1. "We the People...." Released: November 17, 2016; 2. "Dis Generation" Released: February 10, 2017

We Got It from Here... Thank You 4 Your Service (stylized as We got it from Here... Thank You 4 Your service) is the sixth and final studio album by American hip-hop group A Tribe Called Quest. It was released on November 11, 2016, by Epic Records.

Released 18 years after its predecessor The Love Movement, the album was recorded at the AbLab, the New Jersey home studio of group member Q-Tip. The recording featured guest appearances from André 3000, Kendrick Lamar, Jack White, Elton John, Kanye West, Anderson .Paak, Talib Kweli, Consequence, and Busta Rhymes. It was one of the final recorded appearances of group member Phife Dawg, who died in March 2016 from complications of diabetes.

We Got It from Here... became A Tribe Called Quest's second album to chart atop the Billboard 200. It was also a widespread critical success, named by many music publications as one of 2016's ten best albums. The following year, the album was certified gold by the Recording Industry Association of America (RIAA), having sold at least 500,000 album-equivalent units.

== Background ==
After The Love Movement, A Tribe Called Quest split up due to relationship issues between group members, effectively rendering The Love Movement as the supposed final album. For years, Tribe denied that any new material was recorded, or even planned, although they reunited briefly to play several shows during Kanye West's Yeezus Tour in 2013. On November 13, 2015, the group performed on The Tonight Show Starring Jimmy Fallon. Feeling "charged", the group put aside their differences, and decided to record the album in secrecy. Group member Q-Tip said that because of The Tonight Show appearance, "I knew if we were connecting with that kind of energy in a performance, it would be easy to go back to the studio." Phife Dawg's mother said her son "thought they might be able to make a five-song EP and that would be it. He never thought they’d have enough for a whole album."

== Recording, production and composition ==
=== Recording and production ===
The album was recorded for nearly a year at Q-Tip's home studio, the AbLab in New Jersey; the name was derived from "Abstract", one of the rapper's monikers. The studio had been designed with his longtime engineer Blair Wells as a "dream project" that "took years to complete", according to Consequence, the rapper's cousin. The studio was stocked with analog recording equipment, including preamplifiers used on recordings done by Jimi Hendrix, Blondie, and the Ramones, as well as a tape recorder that once belonged to Frank Zappa.

Q-Tip and Phife Dawg spent four months together working on the album; group member and DJ Ali Shaheed Muhammad was unable to co-produce with Q-Tip, as he was producing the Luke Cage soundtrack with Adrian Younge at the time. Q-Tip and Phife Dawg talked extensively about adhering to but not being limited by their group's musical roots. "We knew we had to keep the thread but also push it forward", Q-Tip later said. "With the beats, he was always quick to be like thumbs-up, thumbs-down. He was usually right dead on." In the early stages of making the album, Q-Tip drew inspiration from the rock records of the Stooges and Iggy Pop. "I just love it", he later said. "I think you can hear the rock in our record too."

Phife Dawg traveled to New Jersey by plane from his home, where he was receiving dialysis treatment three times a week for diabetes. The rest of his time was spent staying at a hotel near Q-Tip's home with his manager Dion "Rasta Root" Liverpool and recording the album during the evening. As Liverpool recalled, "every evening he'd go down to the house, and he and Tip would spend hours in there vibing and coming up with lines. Seeing them together in the studio joking, coming up with ideas, disagreeing, vibing, and trading vocals, it was pretty incredible. It was like watching a unicorn." Q-Tip later said he felt like they were "kids again". On March 22, 2016, Phife Dawg died at his home from complications with diabetes. Q-Tip went on to finish the album.

The album's production was credited to Q-Tip, with Wells given co-producer credit. Scratching credits on the album are attributed to DJ Scratch. The recording featured guest contributions from André 3000, Kendrick Lamar, Jack White, Elton John, Kanye West, Anderson .Paak, Talib Kweli, and A Tribe Called Quest's most frequent collaborators Consequence and Busta Rhymes. The album's title had been chosen by Phife Dawg, and although the other members did not understand its meaning, they kept it in place after his death. Q-Tip has stated that it is the group's last album.

=== Composition ===
We Got It from Here... Thank You 4 Your Service is an East Coast hip-hop and jazz rap album influenced by conscious rap. Lyrically, the album features political commentary.

=== Songs ===
The album's first track, "The Space Program", is a metaphor for gentrification, with calls for unity among minorities.

== Release and sales ==
We Got It from Here… Thank You 4 Your Service was released by Epic Records on November 11, 2016. The following day, A Tribe Called Quest appeared as the musical guest on the sketch comedy show Saturday Night Live, where they performed "We the People...." and "The Space Program". On November 20, the album debuted at number one on the Billboard 200, earning 135,000 album-equivalent units, with 112,000 of that figure being pure album sales. It became A Tribe Called Quest's second number one album, and their first since 1996, marking the longest time between number one albums for a hip-hop act. On May 22, 2017, it was certified Gold by the Recording Industry Association of America (RIAA), indicating sales of at least 500,000 album-equivalent units. With this, all of the group's studio albums have received an RIAA certification.

== Critical reception ==
Professional ratings
Aggregate scores
Source	Rating
AnyDecentMusic?	8.4/10
Metacritic	91/100
Review scores
Source	Rating
AllMusic	5/5 stars
The A.V. Club	B+
Entertainment Weekly	B+
The Guardian	4/5 stars
The Independent	4/5 stars
The Irish Times	4/5 stars
Pitchfork	9.0/10
Record Collector	5/5 stars
Rolling Stone	4/5 stars
Vice (Expert Witness)	A+

We Got It from Here... Thank You 4 Your Service was met with widespread critical acclaim. At Metacritic, which assigns a weighted average score out of 100 to reviews from mainstream publications, the album received an average score of 91, based on 26 reviews; it was the year's best-reviewed hip-hop album and fourth best-reviewed album overall, according to the website.

Reviewing the album for Entertainment Weekly in November 2016, Ray Rahman said the album "vividly demonstrate[s] the group's unassailable greatness and continued relevance". Christopher R. Weingarten of Rolling Stone believed that "in both delivery and content", A Tribe Called Quest "maintain the attitude of the Bohemian everydude funkonauts that inspired Kanye West, Andre 3000 and Kendrick Lamar (who all appear here)". In Spin, Brian Josephs praised how the group "worked with the understanding that black music at its finest conversed with ancestry while pointing toward future possibilities in resistance against the racist forces that run parallel." According to Michael Madden from Consequence of Sound, the album exhibits "the classic Tribe sound: a warm and crisp confluence of East Coast hip-hop, jazz, and more, all mixed and mastered impeccably", while Clayton Purdom of The A.V. Club believed the music had more in common with Q-Tip's 2008 solo album The Renaissance than with the group's previous work; he called We Got It from Here... "a sinuous sound collage pulling much more from ’90s and ’00s R&B than it does Native Tongues boom-bap".

Critic Robert Christgau hailed the album as a "triumph" in his review for Vice, writing that the record "represents both their bond and the conscious black humanism they felt sure the nation was ready for ... urging us to love each other as much as we can as we achieve a happiness it's our duty to reaccess if we're to battle as all we can be." He rated it an A-plus. He later said he "rashly awarded that grade in the wake of Donald Trump's electoral coup", but nevertheless went on to name it as the tenth best album of the decade. In The Observer, Kitty Empire wrote that "as the album enters its final third, some focus is lost, but the first two-thirds take no prisoners either lyrically or musically."

=== Accolades ===
At the end of 2016, We Got It from Here... was named one of the year's best albums by music publications; according to Metacritic, it was the eighth most ranked record on critics' top-10 lists. Four critics named it the best album of 2016, including Annie Mac from BBC Radio 1. It was ranked third by Complex; fourth by Billboard, Paste, Q, Slant Magazine, and Spin; fifth by Clash; sixth by The Independent and State; seventh by Pitchfork; eighth by Fact; and tenth by Esquire. New York Times chief critic Jon Pareles ranked We Got It from Here... third on his own year-end list. Christgau named it 2016's best album in his ballot for The Village Voice's annual Pazz & Jop critics poll and later the tenth best album of the 2010s in a decade-end list. Pitchfork ranked We Got It from Here... at number 44 on its decade-end list of "The 200 Best Albums of the 2010s".

== Track listing ==
- All tracks produced by Q-Tip and co-produced by Blair Wells.

Side A
No.	Title	Writer(s)	Vocals	Length
1.	"The Space Program"	Kamaal Fareed; Malik Izaak Taylor; Jarobi White	Q-Tip; Phife; Jarobi	5:40
2.	"We the People...."	Fareed; Taylor; Terrance Butler; Anthony Iommi; John Osbourne; William Ward	Q-Tip; Phife	2:52
3.	"Whateva Will Be"	Fareed; Taylor; Jarobi White; Dexter Mills; Winston Jones	Q-Tip; Phife; Jarobi; Consequence	2:52
4.	"Solid Wall of Sound"	Fareed; Taylor; Trevor Smith; John White	Q-Tip; Phife; Busta Rhymes; Jack White; Elton John	3:43
5.	"Dis Generation"	Fareed; Taylor; Jarobi White; Smith; Headley Bennett; Huford Brown; Lloyd Ferguson; Robert Lyn; Jackie Mittoo; Leroy Sibbles; Fitzroy Simpson	Q-Tip; Phife; Jarobi; Busta Rhymes	3:33
6.	"Kids..."	Fareed; André Benjamin	Q-Tip; André 3000	3:48
7.	"Melatonin"	Fareed; Marsha Ambrosius; Masayuki Hirano; Louis Cato	Q-Tip; Ambrosius; Abbey Smith	4:44
8.	"Enough!!"	Fareed; Jarobi White	Q-Tip; Jarobi	3:20

Side B
No.	Title	Writer(s)	Vocals	Length
1.	"Mobius"	Fareed; Smith; Mills; Kerry Minnear; Derek Shulman; Phillip Shulman; Raymond Shulman	Q-Tip; Busta Rhymes; Consequence	2:51
2.	"Black Spasmodic"	Fareed; Taylor	Q-Tip; Phife; Consequence	3:03
3.	"The Killing Season"	Fareed; Jarobi White; Mills; Talib Greene	Q-Tip; Jarobi; Consequence; Talib Kweli; Kanye West	2:43
4.	"Lost Somebody"	Fareed; Jarobi White; Holger Schüring; Michael Karoli; Jaki Liebezeit; Irmin Schmidt; Kenji Suzuki	Q-Tip; Jarobi; Katia Cadet	4:18
5.	"Movin Backwards"	Fareed; Jarobi White; Brandon Anderson	Q-Tip; Jarobi; Anderson .Paak	4:41
6.	"Conrad Tokyo"	Fareed; Taylor; Kendrick Duckworth	Phife; Kendrick Lamar	3:31
7.	"Ego"	Fareed; John White	Q-Tip	3:17
8.	"The Donald"	Fareed	Q-Tip; Phife; Busta Rhymes; Cadet	5:22
Total length:				60:20

=== Sample credits ===
- "The Space Program" contains samples from the films Willie Dynamite and Willy Wonka and the Chocolate Factory
- "We the People...." contains a sample of "Behind the Wall of Sleep" by Black Sabbath.
- "Whateva Will Be" contains samples of "Promised Land" by Nairobi Sisters.
- "Solid Wall of Sound" contains a sample of "Bennie and the Jets" by Elton John.
- "Dis Generation" contains samples of "Pass the Dutchie" by Musical Youth and "Ruido de magia" by Invisible.
- "Mobius" contains a portion of the composition "Prologue" by Gentle Giant, written by Kerry Minnear, Derek Shulman, Phillip Shulman and Raymond Shulman.
- "Lost Somebody" contains a sample of "Halleluhwah" by Can.
- "Movin Backwards" contains a sample of "The Touch of Your Lips" by The Emotions.
- "Ego" contains a sample of "Requiem for Soprano, Mezzo-Soprano, 2 Mixed Choirs and Orchestra" by György Ligeti.

== Personnel ==
Credits are adapted from the album's liner notes.

=== A Tribe Called Quest ===
- Q-Tip – vocals (tracks 1–13, 15, 16), bass (tracks 2, 4, 6, 8–13, 15, 16), drums (tracks 1, 3, 4, 6, 7, 13), keyboards (tracks 2, 5, 11), drum programming (tracks 2, 5, 7, 14)
- Phife – vocals (tracks 1–5, 10, 14, 16)
- Jarobi White – vocals (tracks 1, 3, 5, 8, 11–13)

=== Additional musicians ===
- Marsha Ambrosius – vocals (track 7)
- André 3000 – vocals (track 6)
- Casey Benjamin – keyboards (tracks 2, 6, 13), Fender Rhodes (tracks 7), organ (track 9), piano (track 15)
- Kris Bowers – piano (track 12)
- Busta Rhymes – vocals (tracks 4, 5, 9, 16)
- Katia Cadet – vocals (tracks 12, 16)
- Louis Cato – bass (tracks 1, 15), guitar (tracks 11, 16), additional bass (track 7)
- Mark Colenburg – additional drums (track 7)
- Consequence – vocals (track 3, 9, 10, 11)
- Masayuki "BIGYUKI" Hirano – keyboards (tracks 1, 4, 6, 8, 9, 11, 16), synthesizer (track 7)
- Elton John – vocals (track 4), piano (track 4)
- Talib Kweli – vocals (track 11)
- Kendrick Lamar – vocals (track 14)
- Anderson .Paak – vocals (track 13)
- Chris Parks – guitar (track 12)
- Chris Sholar – guitar (tracks 1, 7, 12, 13, 15), acoustic guitar (track 9)
- Yebba (Abbey Smith) – vocals (track 7)
- George "DJ Scratch" Spivey – scratches (tracks 8, 15, 16)
- Thaddaeus Tribbett – bass (track 7)
- Blair Wells – guitar (track 9)
- Kanye West – vocals (track 11)
- Jack White – guitar (tracks 15, 16), vocals (track 4), acoustic guitar (track 4)

=== Production ===
- A Tribe Called Quest – executive production
- Q-Tip – production, recording, mixing
- Blair Wells – co-production, recording, mixing
- Gloria Kaba – assistant engineer
- Dave Kennedy – mixing (tracks 1, 2, 4, 6–8, 12)
- Vlado Meller – mastering
- Jeremy Lubsey – mastering assistant
- Michael Starita – additional vocal recording (track 5)
- Laura Gonzalez – assistant engineer (track 5)
- Robert Kirby – assistant engineer (track 5)

=== Release ===
- Tracey Waples – production consultation
- Thom Skarzynski – product manager
- Richard Prince – album cover design
- Anita Marisa Boriboon – creative director, album packaging art direction, design

== Charts ==
=== Weekly charts ===
Chart (2016–17)	Peak position
Australian Albums (ARIA)	13
Austrian Albums (Ö3 Austria)	18
Belgian Albums (Ultratop Flanders)	18
Belgian Albums (Ultratop Wallonia)	104
Canadian Albums (Billboard)	3
Dutch Albums (Album Top 100)	16
Finnish Albums (Suomen virallinen lista)	10
French Albums (SNEP)	75
German Albums (Offizielle Top 100)	14
Irish Albums (IRMA)	24
New Zealand Albums (RMNZ)	13
Norwegian Albums (VG-lista)	31
Scottish Albums (Official Charts)	39
Swedish Albums (Sverigetopplistan)	31
Swiss Albums (Schweizer Hitparade)	12
UK Albums (Official Charts)	24
UK R&B Albums (Official Charts)	1
US Billboard 200	1
US Top R&B/Hip-Hop Albums (Billboard)	1

=== Year-end charts ===
Chart (2017)	Position
Australian Urban Albums (ARIA)	100
Belgian Albums (Ultratop Flanders)	123
US Billboard 200	94
US Top R&B/Hip-Hop Albums (Billboard)	42

== Certifications ==
Region	Certification	Certified units/sales
United Kingdom (BPI)	Silver	60,000^{‡}
United States (RIAA)	Gold	500,000^{‡}
^{‡} Sales+streaming figures based on certification alone.
