= Jarobi White =

American rapper (born 1971)

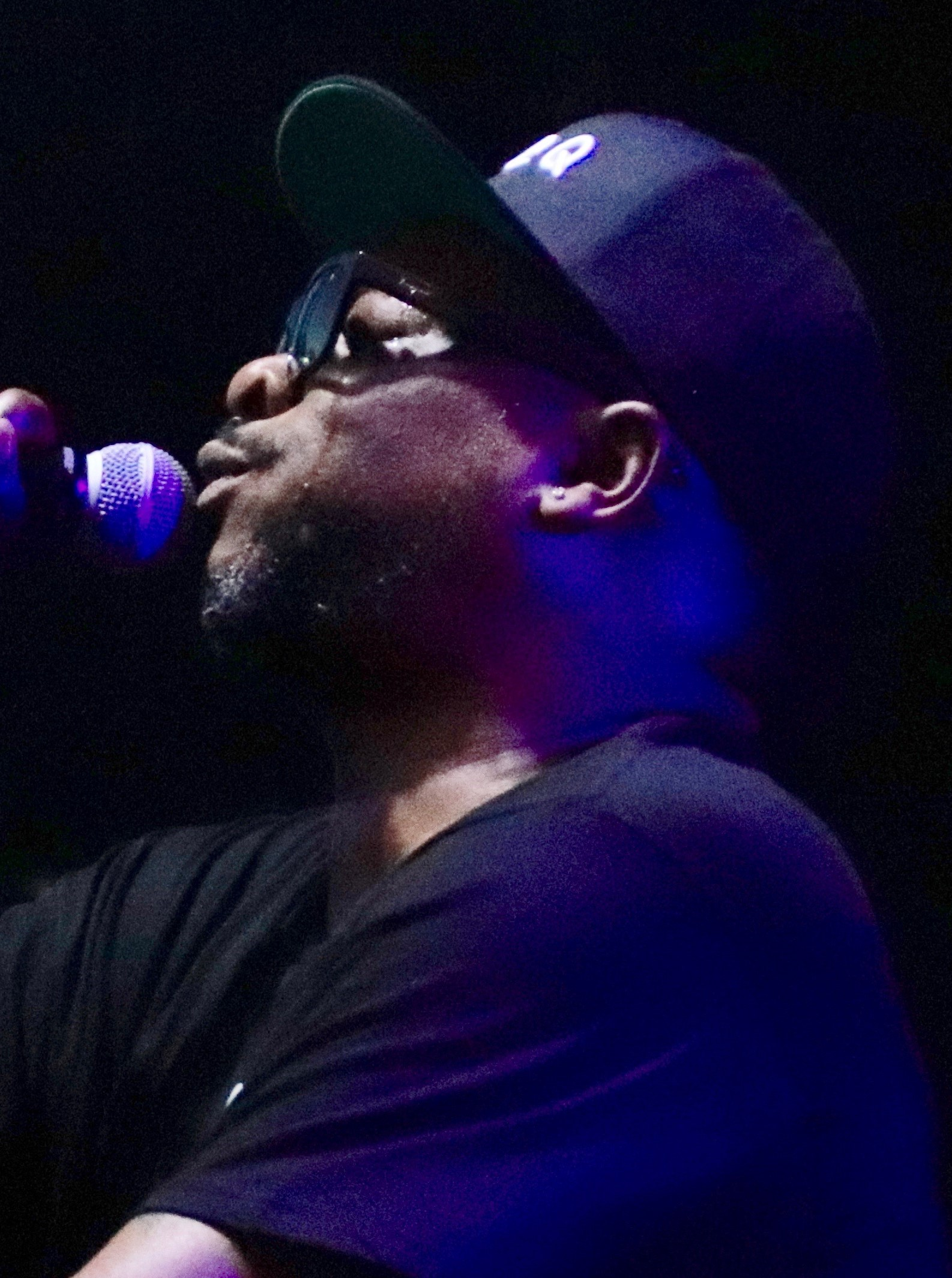
- White performing at Pitchfork Music Festival in 2017

Background information
- Born: July 1, 1971 (age 55); Queens, New York City, U.S.
- Genres: East Coast hip hop
- Occupations: Rapper; chef
- Years active: 1985–present
- Labels: Jive; Epic
- Formerly of: A Tribe Called Quest

Jarobi White (/dʒəˈroʊbi/; born July 1, 1971) is an American rapper and chef, best known as a founding member of hip hop group A Tribe Called Quest, alongside Q-Tip, Phife Dawg, and Ali Shaheed Muhammad. He left the group after the release of their debut album, People's Instinctive Travels and the Paths of Rhythm (1990), in order to pursue culinary arts, before returning for their last album, 2016's We Got It from Here... Thank You 4 Your Service. In the early 2010s, Jarobi formed evitaN with Dres, formerly of Black Sheep. Their first album, Speed of Life, was released in October 2012.

== Career ==
White joined A Tribe Called Quest in the late 1980s as a part-time member. Although he did not rhyme on the albums, he came up with the idea for "I Left My Wallet in El Segundo", which became a single off the group's first album. He also contributed to versions of the songs "Push It Along", "Youthful Expression", and "Can I Kick It?", and appeared in five of the 13 music videos the group produced. He left the group in 1991 to attend culinary school, though he continued to produce songs with DJ Rasta Root and bandmate Phife Dawg until the latter's death in 2016.

He had appeared only on one album, People's Instinctive Travels and the Paths of Rhythm, until returning for the last album in 2016. He had verses recorded for the Tribe's second album, The Low End Theory, but he left the group during the recording sessions and his verses did not make the final cut. He was mentioned in a skit on Midnight Marauders—the members of the group are listed followed by the phrase "A, E, I, O, U and sometimes Y," with the final letter referring to the fact that White was only an occasional member. He was also mentioned on Phife Dawg's solo album Ventilation: Da LP.

As a part of the Native Tongues crew, White appeared on "Pease Porridge" by De La Soul, on its 1991 album De La Soul Is Dead, which features several other Native Tongues emcees as well.

In 2006, White joined A Tribe Called Quest on stage during its performance at the Bumbershoot festival. He is also the manager of Washington D.C.–based rapper Head-Roc.

He was honored along with the rest of A Tribe Called Quest in VH1's fourth annual Hip Hop Honors. In August 2010, Jarobi joined the other three members of A Tribe Called Quest on stage for the Rock the Bells concert festival. In 2016, he returned to appear on the final A Tribe Called Quest album, We Got It from Here... Thank You 4 Your Service.

In 2024, White was inducted into the Rock and Roll Hall of Fame, as a member of A Tribe Called Quest.

He supported Kamala Harris' 2024 presidential campaign.

== Discography ==
- 1990: People's Instinctive Travels and the Paths of Rhythm (with A Tribe Called Quest)
- 2012: Speed of Life (with Dres as evitaN)
- 2016: We Got It from Here... Thank You 4 Your Service (with A Tribe Called Quest)
