= List of songs recorded by Busta Rhymes =

List of songs recorded by Busta Rhymes

== Songs ==
Key
†	Indicates single release
‡	Indicates promotional single release
*	Indicates an unreleased song
•	Indicates uncredited appearance by Busta Rhymes
#	Indicates a skit

Title	Other performer(s)	Producer(s)	Album	Year	Ref(s).
"Abandon Ship" ‡	Rampage	Busta Rhymes	The Coming	1996	
"Against All Odds"	Flipmode Squad	Jamal	Extinction Level Event: The Final World Front	1998	
"All Night"	None	Swizz Beatz	Anarchy	2000	
"Anarchy"	None	Nottz	Anarchy	2000	
"Bladow!!"	None	Scott Storch	Anarchy	2000	
"The Body Rock"	Rampage; Puff Daddy; Mase	Puff Daddy	Extinction Level Event: The Final World Front	1998	
"The Burial Song" (Outro) #	None	DJ Scratch	Extinction Level Event: The Final World Front	1998	
"C'mon All My Niggaz, C'mon All My Bitches"	None	DJ Scratch	Anarchy	2000	
"The Coming" (Intro) #	None	Rick St. Hilaire; DJ Scratch	The Coming	1996	
"Coming Off" ‡	None	DJ Scratch	Non-album promotional single	1997	
"The Current State of Anarchy" (Outro) #	None	None	Anarchy	2000	
"Dangerous" †	None	Rashad Smith	When Disaster Strikes...	1997	
"Do It Like Never Before" ‡	None	Rockwilder	Non-album promotional single	1998	
"Do It to Death"	None	Rockwilder	Extinction Level Event: The Final World Front	1998	
"Do My Thing" †	None	DJ Scratch	The Coming	1996	
"Do the Bus a Bus" ‡	None	DJ Scratch	Extinction Level Event: The Final World Front	1998	
"The End of the World" (Outro) #	None	Rick St. Hilaire	The Coming	1996	
"Enjoy da Ride"	None	J Dilla	Anarchy	2000	
"Everybody Rise" ‡	None	Nottz	Extinction Level Event: The Final World Front	1998	
"Everything Remains Raw" ‡	None	Easy Mo Bee	The Coming	1996	
"Extinction Level Event (The Song Of Salvation)"	None	Nottz	Extinction Level Event: The Final World Front	1998	
"The Finish Line"	None	DJ Scratch	The Coming	1996	
"Fire" †	None	Busta Rhymes	Anarchy	2000	
"Flipmode Squad Meets Def Squad"	Jamal; Redman; Keith Murray; Rampage; Lord Have Mercy	The Vibe Chemist Backspin	The Coming	1996	
"Get High Tonight"	None	DJ Scratch	When Disaster Strikes...	1997	
"Get Off My Block"	Lord Have Mercy	DJ Scratch	When Disaster Strikes...	1997	
"Get Out!!" †	None	Busta Rhymes	Anarchy	2000	
"Gimme Some More" †	None	DJ Scratch	Extinction Level Event: The Final World Front	1998	
"The Heist"	Raekwon; Ghostface Killah; Roc Marciano	Large Professor	Anarchy	2000	
"Here We Go Again"	Flipmode Squad	Just Blaze	Anarchy	2000	
"Hot Fudge"	None	The Vibe Chemist Backspin	The Coming	1996	
"Hot Shit Makin' Ya Bounce"	None	D-Dot; Nashiem Myrick	Extinction Level Event: The Final World Front	1998	
"How Much We Grew"	None	DJ Shok	Anarchy	2000	
"Ill Vibe" ‡	Q-Tip	The Ummah (Q-Tip)	The Coming	1996	
"Intro" #	None	Busta Rhymes; Omar Glover; DJ Scratch	When Disaster Strikes...	1997	
"It's a Party" †	Zhané	Easy Mo Bee	The Coming	1996	
"It's All Good"	None	Latief	When Disaster Strikes...	1997	
"Iz They Wildin Wit Us & Gettin' Rowdy Wit Us"	Mystikal	Darrell "Delite" Allamby; Kenny "Flav" Dickerson	Extinction Level Event: The Final World Front	1998	
"Just Give It to Me Raw"	None	Swizz Beatz	Extinction Level Event: The Final World Front	1998	
"Keep It Movin'"	Leaders of the New School	The Ummah (J Dilla)	The Coming	1996	
"Keepin' It Tight"	None	Armando Colon; Rashad Smith	Extinction Level Event: The Final World Front	1998	
"Live It Up"	None	J Dilla	Anarchy	2000	
"Make Noise"	Lenny Kravitz	Rockwilder	Anarchy	2000	
"One" †	Erykah Badu	Rockwilder	When Disaster Strikes...	1997	
"Outro" #	None	None	Anarchy	2000	
"Party Is Goin' on Over Here" †	None	DJ Scratch	Extinction Level Event: The Final World Front	1998	
"Preparation for the Final World Front" (Outro) #	None	DJ Scratch	When Disaster Strikes...	1997	
"Put Your Hands Where My Eyes Could See" †	None	Shamello; Buddah; Epitome (co.)	When Disaster Strikes...	1997	
"Ready for War"	M.O.P.	Busta Rhymes	Anarchy	2000	
"Rhymes Galore" ‡	None	Rashad Smith	When Disaster Strikes...	1997	
"Salute da Gods!!"	None	DJ Scratch	Anarchy	2000	
"Show Me What You Got"	None	J Dilla	Anarchy	2000	
"So Hardcore"	None	The Ummah (J Dilla)	When Disaster Strikes...	1997	
"Still Shining"	None	The Ummah (J Dilla)	The Coming	1996	
"Street Shit"	None	Just Blaze	Anarchy	2000	
"Survival Hungry"	None	DJ Scratch	When Disaster Strikes...	1997	
"Take It Off"	None	Haas G	Extinction Level Event: The Final World Front	1998	
"Tear Da Roof Off" †	None	Swizz Beatz	Extinction Level Event: The Final World Front	1998	
"There's Not a Problem My Squad Can't Fix"	Jamal	Busta Rhymes	When Disaster Strikes...	1997	
"There's Only One Year Left!!!" (Intro) #	None	DJ Mr. Stanneke	Extinction Level Event: The Final World Front	1998	
"Things We Be Doin' for Money, Part 1"	None	Easy Mo Bee	When Disaster Strikes...	1997	
"Things We Be Doin' for Money, Part 2"	Rampage; Anthony Hamilton; The Chosen Generation	8-Off; Clarence Dorsey (co.)	When Disaster Strikes...	1997	
"This Means War!!"	Ozzy Osbourne	Busta Rhymes	Extinction Level Event: The Final World Front	1998	
"A Trip Out of Town"	None	Nottz	Anarchy	2000	
"Turn It Up"	None	Busta Rhymes	When Disaster Strikes...	1997	
"Turn It Up (Remix) / Fire It Up" †	None	Busta Rhymes; Spliff Star (co.)	When Disaster Strikes... and Can't Hardly Wait: Music From The Motion Picture	1998	
"We Comin' Through"	None	DJ Scratch	Anarchy	2000	
"We Could Take It Outside"	Flipmode Squad	DJ Scratch	When Disaster Strikes...	1997	
"We Put It Down for Y'all"	None	Swizz Beatz	Anarchy	2000	
"What the Fuck You Want!!"	None	Diamond D	Extinction Level Event: The Final World Front	1998	
"What's It Gonna Be?!" †	Janet Jackson	Darrell "Delite" Allamby	Extinction Level Event: The Final World Front	1998	
"When Disaster Strikes"	None	DJ Scratch	When Disaster Strikes...	1997	
"Where We Are About to Take It"	None	Nottz	Extinction Level Event: The Final World Front	1998	
"Why We Die"	DMX; Jay-Z	P. Killer for Trackz	Anarchy	2000	
"The Whole World Lookin' at Me"	None	DJ Scratch	When Disaster Strikes...	1997	
"Woo-Hah!! Got You All in Check" †	None	Busta Rhymes; Rashad Smith	The Coming	1996	
"You Won't Tell, I Won't Tell" ‡	Greg Nice	Armando Colon; Rashad Smith	Non-album promotional single	1997	
