= Turn It Up (Remix) / Fire It Up =

1997 single by Busta Rhymes

Single by Busta Rhymes

from the album When Disaster Strikes... and Can't Hardly Wait: Music From The Motion Picture
- B-side: "Rhymes Galore"
- Released: May 15, 1998
- Recorded: 1997
- Studio: Soundtrack Studios, New York City
- Genre: Hip hop; R&B
- Length: 3:55
- Label: Flipmode; Elektra
- Songwriter: Trevor Smith
- Producers: Busta Rhymes; Spliff Star (co.)

Busta Rhymes singles chronology
"Victory" (1998)	"Turn It Up (Remix) / Fire It Up" (1998)	"Everybody on the Line Outside" (1998)

Music video
- "Turn It Up (Remix) / Fire It Up" on YouTube

"Turn It Up (Remix) / Fire It Up" is a song by American rapper Busta Rhymes. It was released as the fourth and final single from his second studio album, When Disaster Strikes... (1997), and as the second single from the Can't Hardly Wait soundtrack on May 15, 1998, by Rhymes' own Flipmode Entertainment and Elektra Records. The song was written and produced by Rhymes himself, and contains co-production by fellow Flipmode Squad member and Busta's hype man Spliff Star.

The original version of the song, "Turn It Up", was an album track on When Disaster Strikes and almost completely different from the remix version, sampling soul singer Al Green's song "Love and Happiness". However, when issued as the third official single from When Disaster Strikes in the spring of 1998 under a new title "Turn It Up (remix) / Fire It Up", the remix had now contained a sample of the theme from 1980s TV series Knight Rider, and added R&B elements to the hip-hop-centric track.

The song, nonetheless, became Busta's third top-ten hit on the Billboard Hot 100, reaching number ten. It also became a hit on the rap (#1), dance (#2), and R&B charts (#7). Internationally, the single was a major success, reaching number two in the United Kingdom and number three in Canada. The lyrics mostly center around music technology and erotic dancing. Alabama producer, DJ Krish Moodbidri and DJ Malika helped the song gain more popularity by playing it at all his gigs. The song was also sampled by Panjabi MC for his breakout single "Mundian To Bach Ke".

== Original version ==
"Turn It Up"

Song by Busta Rhymes

from the album When Disaster Strikes
- Released: September 16, 1997
- Studio: Soundtrack Studios, New York City
- Genre: Hip hop
- Length: 4:11
- Label: Flipmode; Elektra
- Songwriters: Trevor Smith; Al Green
- Producer: Busta Rhymes

"Turn It Up" is a song by American rapper Busta Rhymes, released as part of his second studio album When Disaster Strikes. The song was written and produced by Rhymes, and recorded at Soundtrack Studios, based in New York City. Since the song contains a sample of soul singer Al Green's song "Love and Happiness", he is also credited as a songwriter on "Turn It Up".

=== Composition ===
"Turn It Up" was composed in 4/4 time and the key of E major, with a tempo of 91 beats per minute. It has a duration time of four minutes and eleven seconds.

== Remix ==
=== Composition ===
"Turn It Up (Remix) / Fire It Up" was composed in 4/4 time and the key of D major, with a tempo of 104 beats per minute. It has a duration time of three minutes and fifty-eight seconds. The Al Green sample is replaced with a sample from the 1980s television series Knight Rider.

=== Critical reception ===
A reviewer from Music Week named the song Single of the Week, writing, "'Turn It Up' would have seemed the most unlikely of Busta Rhymes' singles to have crossover success but it looks set for just that thanks to heavy radio rotation on Radio One which has so far put it on its B-list." James Hyman from the Record Mirror Dance Update gave it five out of five and named it Tune of the Week, adding, "In the LP version, Busta samples Al Green's 'Love and Happiness' as a refrain for an overall slinky, shutfling rap track. But it's game over when 'Fire It Up' uses the hook from the 'Knight Rider' TV theme to come up with a raucous rap-raging winner that only someone such as Busta could pull off so effectively."

=== Commercial performance ===
==== United States of America ====
Upon its release, the single charted at number 10 on the Billboard Hot 100, becoming Rhymes' third top-ten hit on the chart, following "Woo-Hah!! Got You All in Check" from The Coming (1996) and "Dangerous", the second single from When Disaster Strikes... (1997). It also charted at number 38 on the Rhythmic Airplay chart, number 7 on the Hot R&B/Hip-Hop Songs chart, and number 2 on the Dance Singles Sales chart, and peaked at the top of the Hot Rap Songs chart. The song would eventually be certified Gold by the Recording Industry Association of America (RIAA) for equivalent sales of 700,000 units in the United States. By the end of 1998, the single was positioned at number 73 on the Billboard Hot 100 and was positioned at number 75 on the Hot R&B Singles chart.

==== Other English-speaking countries ====
In the United Kingdom, the single charted and number 2 on the UK singles chart, and was blocked from reaching the top position by Run-DMC and Jason Nevins' remix of "It's Like That". It did, however, reach the top of the UK Dance Singles Chart and the UK Hip Hop and R&B Singles Chart. It would eventually be certified Silver by the British Phonographic Industry (BPI) for equivalent sales of 200,000 units in the country. By the end of 1998, the single was positioned at number 50 on the UK singles chart and was positioned at number 11 on the UK Urban Chart.

In Australia, the single charted at number 88 on the ARIA Charts. In Canada, the single charted at number 8 on the Canadian Dance/Urban chart and peaked at number 3 on the Canadian Hot 100. In New Zealand, the single topped the Official Aotearoa Music Charts and was certified Platinum by Recorded Music New Zealand (RMNZ) for equivalent sales of 10,000 units in the country. By the end of 1998, the single was positioned at number 10 on the Official Aotearoa Music Charts.

==== Europe ====
In Austria, the single charted at number 13 on the Ö3 Austria Top 40. In Belgium, the single charted at number 36 on the Ultratop 50 chart in Wallonia and peaked at number 31 on the same chart in Flanders. In France, the single charted at number 58 on the SNEP chart. In Finland, the single charted at number 2 on the Suomen virallinen lista chart. in Germany, the single charted at number 7 on the GfK Entertainment charts. By the end of 1998, the single was positioned at number 66 on the Media Control chart. In the Netherlands, the single charted at number 3 on both the Dutch Top 40 chart and the Dutch Single Top 100 chart. By the end of 1998, the single was positioned at number 87 on the Dutch Top 40 and was positioned at number 80 on the Dutch Single Top 100 chart. In Scotland, the single charted at number 4 on the Scottish Singles Chart. In Sweden, the single charted at number 30 on the Sverigetopplistan chart. In Switzerland, the single charted at number 6 on the Schweizer Hitparade.

=== Music video ===
The video features Busta in a post-apocalyptic future, fighting a genetically engineered warrior and taking down a totalitarian dictatorship.

=== Track listing ===
==== A-side ====
1. "Turn It Up / Fire It Up" (Clean version) – 3:58
2. "Turn It Up / Fire It Up" (Dirty version) – 3:58
3. "Turn It Up / Fire It Up" (Instrumental) – 3:58

==== B-side ====
1. "Rhymes Galore" (LP Version Clean) – 2:33
2. "Rhymes Galore" (LP Version Dirty) – 2:33
3. "Rhymes Galore" (Instrumental) – 2:33

=== Charts ===
==== Weekly charts ====
Chart (1998)	Peak position
Australia (ARIA)	88
Austria (Ö3 Austria Top 40)	13
Belgium (Ultratop 50 Flanders)	31
Belgium (Ultratop 50 Wallonia)	36
Canada (Nielsen SoundScan)	3
Canada Dance/Urban (RPM)	8
Europe (Eurochart Hot 100)	13
France (SNEP)	58
Finland (Suomen virallinen lista)	2
Germany (GfK)	7
Iceland (Íslenski Listinn Topp 40)	3
Ireland (IRMA)	6
Netherlands (Dutch Top 40)	3
Netherlands (Single Top 100)	3
New Zealand (Recorded Music NZ)	1
Scottish Singles Sales (Official Charts)	4
Sweden (Sverigetopplistan)	30
Switzerland (Schweizer Hitparade)	6
UK Singles (Official Charts)	2
UK Dance (Official Charts)	1
UK Hip Hop/R&B (Official Charts)	1
US Billboard Hot 100	10
US Dance Singles Sales (Billboard)	2
US Hot R&B/Hip-Hop Songs (Billboard)	7
US Hot Rap Songs (Billboard)	1
US Rhythmic Airplay (Billboard)	38

==== Year-end charts ====
Chart (1998)	Position
Europe (Eurochart Hot 100)	13
Germany (Media Control)	66
Netherlands (Dutch Top 40)	87
Netherlands (Single Top 100)	80
New Zealand (RIANZ)	10
UK Singles (OCC)	50
UK Urban (Music Week)	11
US Billboard Hot 100	73
US Hot R&B Singles (Billboard)	75
US Hot Rap Singles (Billboard)	18

=== Certifications ===
Region	Certification	Certified units/sales
New Zealand (RMNZ)	Platinum	10,000^{*}
United Kingdom (BPI)	Silver	200,000^{^}
United States (RIAA)	Gold	700,000
^{*} Sales figures based on certification alone.^{^} Shipments figures based on certification alone.
