= Anarchy (Busta Rhymes album) =

Studio album by Busta Rhymes
- Released: June 20, 2000
- Recorded: 1999–2000
- Studios: Metalworks Studios, Mississauga, Canada
- Genre: Hip hop
- Length: 78:19
- Labels: Flipmode Iz da Squad!! 2000; Flipmode; Violator; Elektra
- Producers: DJ Scratch; Jay Dee; Nottz; Swizz Beatz; Scott Storch; Just Blaze; Busta Rhymes; DJ Shok; Rockwilder; Large Professor; P. Killer Trackz

Busta Rhymes chronology
Extinction Level Event: The Final World Front (1998)	Anarchy (2000)	Genesis (2001)

Singles from Anarchy
- 1. "Get Out!!" Released: June 3, 2000; 2. "Fire" Released: July 29, 2000

Professional ratings
Review scores
Source	Rating
AllMusic	3/5 stars
Christgau's Consumer Guide	(neither)
Entertainment Weekly	C−
The Guardian	2/5 stars
NME	3.5/5 stars
The Phoenix	2.5/4 stars
RapReviews	6/10
Rolling Stone	3/5 stars
USA Today	3.5/4 stars
Yakima Herald	4/5 stars

Anarchy is the fourth studio album by American rapper and record producer Busta Rhymes, released on June 20, 2000, by Flipmode Records and Elektra Records. It comes after the release of The Coming, When Disaster Strikes and Extinction Level Event (Final World Front). The album debuted at number 4 on the Billboard 200 with first-week sales of 164,000 copies. The album would later be certified Platinum by the RIAA. This was Busta's final album with Elektra Records.

== Track listing ==
Credits adapted from the album's liner notes.

No.	Title	Writer(s)	Producer(s)	Length
1.	"Intro: The Current State of Anarchy"			2:27
2.	"Salute da Gods!!"	Trevor Smith; George Spivey; Thom Bell; Linda Creed	DJ Scratch	3:47
3.	"Enjoy da Ride"	T. Smith; James Yancey	Jay Dee	3:37
4.	"We Put It Down for Y'all"	T. Smith; Kasseem Dean	Swizz Beatz	3:30
5.	"Bladow!!"	T. Smith; Scott Storch	Scott Storch	3:40
6.	"Street Shit"	T. Smith; Justin Smith	Just Blaze	3:54
7.	"Live It Up"	T. Smith; J. Yancey	Jay Dee	3:42
8.	"Fire"	T. Smith; Nickolas Ashford; Valerie Simpson	Busta Rhymes	2:50
9.	"All Night"	T. Smith; K. Dean	Swizz Beatz	3:44
10.	"Show Me What You Got"	T. Smith; J. Yancey; Lætitia Sadier; Tim Gane	Jay Dee	3:43
11.	"Get Out!!"	T. Smith; Dominick Lamb; Darryl Sloan; Frank Loesser	Nottz	3:04
12.	"The Heist" (featuring Raekwon, Ghostface Killah and Roc Marciano)	T. Smith; Rahkeim Meyer; Dennis Coles; Corey Woods	Large Professor	4:17
13.	"A Trip Out of Town"	T. Smith; D. Lamb; D. Sloan; Eugene Raskin	Nottz	5:25
14.	"How Much We Grew"	T. Smith; Michael Gomez	DJ Shok	4:55
15.	"Here We Go Again" (featuring The Flipmode Squad)	T. Smith; Roger McNair; Rashia Fisher; William Lewis; Leroy Jones; J. Smith	Just Blaze	3:29
16.	"We Comin' Through"	T. Smith; G. Spivey	DJ Scratch	3:00
17.	"C'mon All My Niggaz, C'mon All My Bitches"	T. Smith; G. Spivey	DJ Scratch	2:55
18.	"Make Noise" (featuring Lenny Kravitz)	T. Smith; Dana Stinson	Rockwilder	3:18
19.	"Ready for War" (featuring M.O.P)	T. Smith	Busta Rhymes	4:18
20.	"Why We Die" (featuring DMX and Jay-Z)	T. Smith; Earl Simmons; Shawn Carter	P. Killer for Trackz	4:01
21.	"Anarchy"	T. Smith; D. Lamb; D. Sloan	Nottz	4:13
22.	"Outro"			0:46

Sample credits

- "Salute da Gods!!" contains a sample from "Betcha by Golly Wow!", written by Thom Bell and Linda Creed, performed by Ferrante & Teicher
- "Enjoy da Ride" contains a sample from "Dream Suite" by Dreams.
- "Fire" embodies portions of "Surrender", written by Nickolas Ashford and Valerie Simpson.
- "Show Me What You Got" contains a sample from "Come and Play in the Milky Night", written by Lætitia Sadier and Tim Gane, performed by Stereolab.
- "Get Out!!" contains a sample from "The Ugly Duckling", written by Frank Loesser, performed by the Richard Wolfe Children's Chorus.
- "A Trip Out of Town" contains a sample from "Those Were the Days" written by Eugene Raskin.
- "Ready for War" contains a sample from "Can’t It Wait Until Tomorrow" performed by Diana Ross.

== Charts ==
=== Weekly charts ===
Chart (2000)	Peak position
Dutch Albums (Album Top 100)	87
French Albums (SNEP)	54
German Albums (Offizielle Top 100)	63
New Zealand Albums (RMNZ)	50
Swiss Albums (Schweizer Hitparade)	65
UK Albums (Official Charts)	38
UK R&B Albums (Official Charts)	7
US Billboard 200	4
US Top R&B/Hip-Hop Albums (Billboard)	1

=== Year-end charts ===
Chart (2000)	Position
US Billboard 200	157
US Top R&B/Hip-Hop Albums (Billboard)	54

== Certifications ==
Region	Certification	Certified units/sales
United States (RIAA)	Platinum	1,000,000^{^}
^{^} Shipments figures based on certification alone.
