= The Stanton Session =

The Stanton Session is a 2001 mix album by the Bristol-based breakbeat duo Stanton Warriors. It contains three tracks by them which all charted on the UK Singles Chart: "Da Virus", "Da Antidote" and "Can You Feel It/Everybody Come On". The latter is a mashup by the duo which was a No. 13 UK hit.

== Track listing ==
1. "Intro" - Stanton Warriors - 0:55
2. "Jump n' Shout" (Stanton Warriors Remix) - Basement Jaxx - 4:53
3. "Distraction"/"Has It Come to This" - Jammin, The Streets/DJ Zinc - 4:39
4. "Can You Feel It/Everybody Come On" - Mr. Reds, DJ Skribble - 3:20
5. "Action" - Stanton Warriors - 2:30
6. "Move It with Your Mind" - Plump DJs - 2:08
7. "Bass Tone" - Sole Fusion - 2:51
8. "Good Old Love" - Biological - 3:20
9. "The Phantom" - Versions Excursions - 5:57
10. "Da Virus" - Stanton Warriors - 4:37
11. "Be Bop" - Jeremy Sylvester - 2:58
12. "Gyromancer" (False Prophet Mix) - PMT- 5:50
13. "Me and Spoonice" (Blue Effect Mix) - Spoon Wizard - 4:15
14. "Right Here" - Stanton Warriors - 4:18
15. "Da Antidote" - Stanton Warriors - 4:00
16. "Runnin" - T Power - 4:16
17. "Stone Cold" - Groove Chronicles - 4:26
