= Stanton Warriors =

British DJ and production duo

- Origin: Bristol, England
- Genres: Breakbeat, UK garage, house
- Labels: Punks, Fabric, V2, XL, Skint, Central Station (Universal Music), Nest HQ
- Members: Dominic Butler; Mark Yardley
- Website: StantonWarriors.com

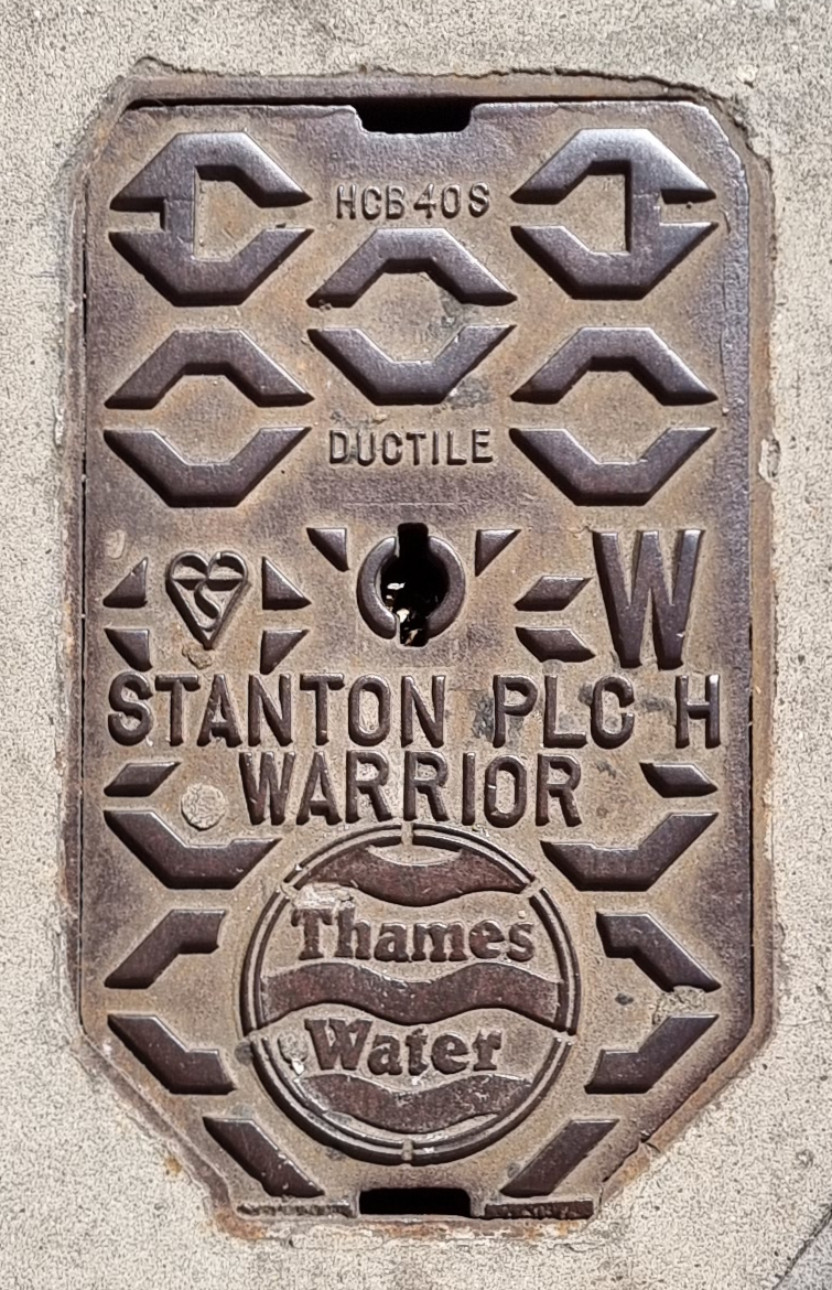
A Stanton Ironworks "Warrior" on a London street

Stanton Warriors are a British DJ and production duo consisting of Dominic Butler and Mark Yardley. Originally from the West Country, the duo have performed internationally with their infamous Stanton Sessions parties in Europe, North America, Asia and Australia. Their name was taken from a manhole cover, made by Stanton Ironworks. Stanton record player needles are popular with DJs for their ability to scratch records.

The Stanton Warriors' third mix album was released in the UK on 27 October 2008, entitled Stanton Session Vol. 3, which is their best-seller to date, and received 5 out of 5 from iDJ. This was also released in a limited run, deluxe edition manhole cover tin pack.

The graffiti style artwork (and their SW logo) seen on many of their releases and merchandise is the work of several renowned graffiti artists, SheOne and Rough, the latter of which won a design award for the artwork on the Stanton Warrior's single, "Da Antidote".

The Stantons have release free promotional DJ sets available for download via their website, which also features live video footage of their gigs. Now based in West London, they run a successful record label, Punks, from their recording studio.

== Selected discography ==
=== Albums and EPs ===
- 1997: Headz of State EP (with Deeper Cut)
- 1997: Deeper Cut/Headz of State EP
- 2001: The Stanton Session
- 2006: The Stanton Sessions Vol. 2 / The Lost Files
- 2006: Fabric Live 30
- 2007: Remixes (Skint) – (compilation album of Stanton Warrior's remixes of other artists)
- 2008: The Stanton Sessions Vol. 3
- 2011: The Warriors – UK No. 186
- 2013: Sessions IV
- 2014: The Bones EP
- 2015: Rebel Bass
- 2015: Keep It Movin' EP
- 2016: Sound of Punks
- 2019: Rise
- 2024: The Stanton Sessions Vol. 5

=== Singles ===
- 2000: "Da Virus" – UK No. 91 (2004)
- 2001: "Da Antidote" – UK No. 69
- 2003: "Break Me with You / Reckless Dub" – UK No. 124
- 2003: "Everybody Come On (Can U Feel It)" (Stanton Warriors Remix) – Mr Reds vs DJ Skribble – UK No. 13
- 2004: "Slanty" – UK No. 93
- 2004: "Adventures in Success" – UK No. 93
- 2006: "Get 'Em High" (feat. Sway) – UK No. 189
- 2009: "Precinct"
- 2011: "Turn Me Up Some"
- 2013: "Cut Me Up"
- 2014: "Loving Me Wrong"
- 2015: "The One"
- 2016: "Bounce"
- 2017: "Walking"
- 2017: "Feel This Way" (feat. Grove)
- 2017: "Under the Lights"
- 2017: "Keep on Doing"
- 2017: "Colima"
- 2018: "Pop Ya Cork (Remixes)"
- 2018: "Pop Ya Cork (Technasia Remix)" (feat. Twista)
- 2019: "What You Got Now"
- 2019: "They Follow" (feat. Stush & Foreign Beggars)
- 2019: "What You Got Now" (feat. Taiki Nulight)
- 2019: "Up2U" (Huxley Remix) (feat. Sian Evans)
- 2019: "Up2U" (feat. Sian Evans)
- 2019: "Up2U" (Rene Lavice Rooftop Remix) (feat. Sian Evans)
- 2019: "Up2U" (Apollo Remixes) (feat. Sian Evans)
- 2020: "Green Light" (Majestic Remix) (feat. Ami Carmine)
- 2020: "Green Light" (Unorthodox Remix) (feat. Ami Carmine)
- 2020: "Somali Funk"
- 2020: "Time"
- 2021: "Jump" (feat. Knytro & Deadly)
- 2021: "Down On"
- 2024: "Afrodisiac" (Stanton Warriors & Skool of Thought)
- 2024: "Bronx Posse" (Stanton Warriors & Skool of Thought)
- 2024: "Bring Me Down" (Riordan & Stanton Warriors)
- 2024: "Gonna Be" (Stanton Warriors & Jem Haynes)
- 2024: "Catch the Sky" (Stanton Warriors & Zero B)

=== Remixes ===
- Basement Jaxx – "Bingo Bango" (Stanton Warriors Remix)
- Fatboy Slim – "Demons" (Stanton Warriors Remix)
- Basement Jaxx – "Where's Your Head At" (Stanton Warriors Remix)
- The Streets – "Has It Come To This" (Stanton Warriors Remix)
- Azzido Da Bass – "Dooms Night" (Stanton Warriors Remix)
- Mylo – "Drop The Pressure" (Stanton Warriors Remix) (Punks)
- Deekline & Ed Solo – "Hands Up" (Stanton Warriors Remix)
- Claude Von Stroke – "Who's Afraid of Detroit" (Stanton Warriors Remix)
- Cosmos – "Take Me With You" (Stanton Warriors 'Break Me with You' Remix) (Punks)
- Booka Shade – "Mandarine Girl" (Stanton Warriors Remix)
- Gorillaz – "Feel Good Inc" (Stanton Warriors Remix)
- Gabrielle – "Falling" (Stanton Warriors Vocal Mix / Stanton Warriors Dub Mix)
- Brighton Port Authority – "Toe Jam" (Stanton Warriors Remix)
- Alter Ego – "Rocker" (Stanton Warriors Remix)
- Goose – "Bring It On" (Stanton Warriors Remix)
- Apollo 440 – "Dude Descending a Staircase" (Stanton Warriors Remix)
- Tim Deluxe – "It Just Won't Do" (Stanton Warriors Remix)
- Beginnerz – "Reckless Girl" (Stanton Warriors Remix)
- Plump DJs – "Shifting Gears" (Stanton Warriors Remix) (Finger Lickin' Records)
- Eurythmics – "Here Comes The Rain Again" (Stanton Warriors Remix)
- Frankie Valli and The Four Seasons – "Beggin'" (Stanton Warriors Remix)' (CDR)
- DJ Mehdi – "Signatune" (Stanton Warriors remix) – Ed Banger
- Digitalism – "Zdarlight" (Stanton Warriors remix) – Virgin
- Chemical Brothers – "Saturate" (Stanton Warriors mix)
- Yo Majesty – "Club Action" (Stanton Warriors Remix)
- DJ Skribble vs Stanton Warriors – "Everybody Come On"
- The Black Eyed Peas – "The Time" (Stanton Warriors Remix)
- MIA – "Internet Connection" (Stanton Warriors Remix)
- Tensnake – "Coma Cat" (Stanton Warriors Re-Bump)
- Daft Punk – "Derezzed" (Stanton Warriors Tron Punk Re-Bounce)
- Boys Noize – "Yeah" (Stanton Warriors Re-Bump)
- Big Boi – "Shutterbug" (Stanton Warriors Re-F*ck)
- Jay Z feat. Kanye West – "N!**@s in Paris" (Stanton Warriors Remix)
- Julio Bashmore – "Au Seve" (Stanton Warriors Re-Bash)

== Music videos ==
In August 2013, Vice's music blog Thump premiered the video for "Cut Me Up". Shot in Los Angeles, the video is a character vignette of a fictional gang of skaters named the Stanton Warriors. Much has been made over its presentation of the role reversal position of the city's gang problem. It premiered on MTV in September. The video was directed by Edward John Drake.
