= One (Busta Rhymes song) =

1998 single by Busta Rhymes

Single by Busta Rhymes featuring Erykah Badu

from the album When Disaster Strikes...
- B-side: "Rhymes Galore"
- Released: July 7, 1998
- Studio: Soundtrack Studios, New York City; Sound Techniques, Boston, Massachusetts
- Genre: Hip hop; R&B; neo soul
- Length: 4:24
- Label: Flipmode; Elektra
- Songwriter(s): Trevor Smith; Erica Wright; Dana Stinson; Stevland Morris
- Producer(s): Rockwilder

Busta Rhymes singles chronology
"Everybody on the Line Outside" (1998)	"One" (1998)	"Cha Cha Cha" (1998)

Erykah Badu singles chronology
"All Night Long" (1998)	"One" (1998)	"You Got Me" (1999)

"One" is a song by American rapper Busta Rhymes featuring American singer Erykah Badu. It was released as the third single from Rhymes' second studio album When Disaster Strikes... on July 7, 1998, by Flipmode Entertainment and Elektra Records. The song was written by Rhymes, Badu and its producer Rockwilder. Since the song contains a sample of Stevie Wonder's 1976 song "Love's in Need of Love Today", he is also credited as a songwriter on "One". The song also contains an interpolation of American rock band Tom Tom Club's 1981 song "Genius of Love".

Peaking at number 23 on the UK Singles Chart and at number 17 on the official New Zealand Chart, the song proved to be a moderate success. But ultimately, no music video was shot.

== Composition ==
"One" was composed in 4/4 time and the key of F♯ major, with a tempo of 88 beats per minute. It has a duration time of four minutes and twenty-four seconds.

== Track listing ==
No.	Title	Writer(s)	Producer(s)	Length
1.	"One" (featuring Erykah Badu)	Trevor Smith; Erica Wright; Dana Stinson; Stevland Morris	Rockwilder	4:23
2.	"Rhymes Galore"	Smith; Rashad Smith; Rufus Thomas; Jo Bridges; Mack Rice; Tom Nixon	Rashad Smith	2:33
3.	"Rhymes Galore" (instrumental)		Rashad Smith	2:33

== Charts ==
Chart (1998)	Peak position
New Zealand (Recorded Music NZ)	17
UK Singles (OCC)	23
