= Everybody Come On =

1999 single by DJ Skribble

Single by DJ Skribble featuring Busta Rhymes, Rampage, Spliff, Consequence and Ed Lover

from the album Traffic Jams
- Released: 1999
- Genre: Hip hop
- Label: Warlock; FFRR
- Songwriters: Scott Ialacci; Trevor Smith; Roger McNair; William Lewis; Dexter Raymond Mills; James Roberts; Rashad Smith; Kenneth Gamble; Leon Huff
- Producers: DJ Skribble; Anthony Acid; Rashad Smith; Armando Colon

DJ Skribble singles chronology
"Everybody Come On" (1999)	"Bah Dah Bing, Bah Dah Boom" (1999)

Busta Rhymes singles chronology
"What's It Gonna Be?!" (1999)	"Everybody Come On" (1999)	"Get Out!!" (2000)

Rampage singles chronology
"Take It There" (1998)	"Everybody Come On" (1999)	"Come Get It" (1999)

Spliff singles chronology
"Cha Cha Cha" (1998)	"Everybody Come On" (1999)	"I Know What You Want" (2003)

Consequence singles chronology
"Queens Get the Money" (1997)	"Everybody Come On" (1999)	"Turn Ya Self In" (2003)

Ed Lover singles chronology
"For the Love of You" (1995)	"Everybody Come On" (1999)

"Everybody Come On" is a song by American DJ and producer DJ Skribble featuring American rappers Busta Rhymes, Rampage and Spliff, all of the Flipmode Squad, along with fellow rappers Consequence and Ed Lover.

== Track listings ==
12" single
A1. "Everybody Come On" (NMCB 12")
A2. "Everybody Come On" (original TV track edit)
B1. "Everybody Come On" (original 12")
B2. "Everybody Come On" (NMCB clean edit)

UK CD maxi-single

1. "Everybody Come On" (NMCB radio edit)
2. "Everybody Come On" (original radio edit)
3. "Everybody Come On" (Stripe remix edit)
4. "Everybody Come On" (NMCB 12" mix)

== Other releases ==
Also in 1999, a UK garage remix of the track was released by English duo Stanton Warriors on the Fifty First Recordings label.

== 2003 version ==
"Everybody Come On (Can U Feel It)"

Single by Mr Reds vs. DJ Skribble
- Released: 16 June 2003
- Genre: UK garage
- Label: FFRR
- Songwriters: Kenneth Gamble, Leon Huff, Scott Ialacci, William A. Lewis. Roger McNair, Dexter Raymond Mills, James E Roberts, Rashad Smith, Trevor Smith
- Producer: Stanton Warriors

"Everybody Come On (Can U Feel It)" is a 2003 single by Mr Reds vs. DJ Skribble. Produced by English duo Stanton Warriors, the song is a mashup using the vocals from "Everybody Come On" by DJ Skribble and the instrumental backing track of "Can You Feel It" by Mr Reds. This version was a top 20 hit in the UK, peaking at No. 13 on the UK Singles Chart in mid-2003.

=== Track listing ===
UK CD single

1. "Everybody Come On (Can U Feel It)" (Stanton Warriors remix)
2. "Everybody Come On" - DJ Skribble (NMCB clean edit)
3. "Can U Feel It" - Mr Reds
4. Video
