= It's a Party (song) =

1996 single by Busta Rhymes featuring Zhané

Single by Busta Rhymes featuring Zhané

from the album The Coming
- A-side: It's a Party (AllStar Remix)
- B-side: Ill Vibe
- Released: 1996
- Recorded: Summer 1995
- Studio: Soundtrack Studios, New York City
- Genre: East Coast hip hop; R&B
- Length: 5:53; 4:38 (single)
- Label: Flipmode; Elektra
- Songwriters: Trevor Smith; Rene Neufville
- Producer: Easy Mo Bee

Busta Rhymes singles chronology
"Woo-Hah!! Got You All in Check (The World Wide Remix)" (1996)	"It's a Party" (1996)	"Wild for da Night" (1996)

Zhané singles chronology
"Vibe" (1994)	"It's a Party" (1996)	"4 More" (1997)

Music video
- "It's a Party" on YouTube

"It's a Party" is a song by American rapper Busta Rhymes featuring American R&B duo Zhané. It was released as the second single from Rhymes' debut studio album The Coming in 1996, by Flipmode Entertainment and Elektra Records. The song was written by Rhymes and Zhané member Rene Neufville, and produced by Easy Mo Bee. Peaking at number 52 on the US Billboard Hot 100, it was a moderate success. The song was released as a double A-side single with several remixes and the album cut "Ill Vibe" featuring fellow rapper Q-Tip, which also appears on The Coming, as its B-side.

== Background ==
After former group Leaders of the New School broke up, Rhymes had problems with recording a full album on his own. Rhymes called up A Tribe Called Quest-member and mentor Q-Tip asking for help. After seven months of frustration, he finally came up with the idea that would become the skit after "It's a Party".

"It's a Party" marks the second collaboration between Busta Rhymes and producer Easy Mo Bee after he previously produced the remix to Craig Mack's "Flava in Ya Ear" and 1995 single "The Points". The song precessed Rhymes' collaborations with Janet Jackson on "What's It Gonna Be?!" and Mariah Carey on "I Know What You Want".

== Composition ==
"It's a Party" was composed in 4/4 time and the key of F minor, with a tempo of 178 beats per minute. It has a duration time of five minutes and fifty-three seconds.

== Critical reception ==
Daryl McIntosh of Albumism noted that the song shows that Busta Rhymes "could entertain more than just the 'hard-knocks' at the party [and] now captur[es] the ladies' attention". He added that "the late-night gem added a new chapter to the growing legend of Busta Rhymes".

== Music video ==
The official music video for "It's a Party" was directed by Marcus Raboy and depicts Busta Rhymes and Zhané at a party. Flipmode-members Spliff Star and Rampage, as well as Beastie Boys member MCA make cameo appearances.

== Track listing ==
=== United States 12" single ===
Side A
No.	Title	Writer(s)	Producer(s)	Length
1.	"It's a Party" (LP Version featuring Zhané)	Trevor Smith; Rene Neufville	Easy Mo Bee	4:38
2.	"It's a Party (AllStar Remix)" (featuring SWV)	Smith; Melissa Elliott	Allen "Allstar" Gordon	4:10
3.	"It's a Party (The Ummah Remix)" (featuring Zhané)	Smith; Neufville	The Ummah (Jay Dee)	4:17
4.	"It's a Party" (LP Version Instrumental)		Easy Mo Bee	4:40
5.	"It's a Party (AllStar Remix)" (Instrumental)		Allen "Allstar" Gordon	4:32
6.	"It's a Party (AllStar Remix)" (Acapella featuring SWV)	Smith; Elliott		4:03

Side B
No.	Title	Writer(s)	Producer(s)	Length
1.	"Ill Vibe" (LP Version featuring Q-Tip)	Smith; Kamaal Fareed	The Ummah (Q-Tip)	3:40
2.	"Ill Vibe (The Ummah Remix)" (featuring Q-Tip)	Smith; Kamaal Fareed	The Ummah (Jay Dee)	3:38
3.	"Ill Vibe" (LP Version Instrumental)		The Ummah (Q-Tip)	3:41
4.	"Ill Vibe (The Ummah Remix)" (Instrumental)		The Ummah (Jay Dee)	4:17
5.	"Ill Vibe" (Acapella featuring Q-Tip)	Smith; Harvey		3:05
Total length:				44:41

=== United Kingdom 12" single ===
Side A
No.	Title	Writer(s)	Producer(s)	Length
1.	"It's a Party (Soul Inside Radio Mix)" (featuring Zhané)	Trevor Smith; Rene Neufville	Dodge	4:24
2.	"It's a Party (Soul Inside Work Permit Mix)" (featuring Zhané)	Smith; Neufville	Dodge	4:24

Side B
No.	Title	Writer(s)	Producer(s)	Length
1.	"It's a Party (AllStar Remix)" (featuring SWV)	Smith; Melissa Elliott	Allen "Allstar" Gordon	4:10
2.	"It's a Party (The Ummah Remix)" (featuring Zhané)	Smith; Neufville	The Ummah (Jay Dee)	4:16
Total length:				17:14

=== United Kingdom CD single ===
No.	Title	Writer(s)	Producer(s)	Length
1.	"It's a Party (Soul Inside Radio Mix)" (featuring Zhané)	Trevor Smith; Rene Neufville	Dodge	4:24
2.	"It's a Party" (LP Radio Edit featuring Zhané)	Smith; Neufville	Easy Mo Bee	4:26
3.	"It's a Party (Soul Inside Work Permit Mix)" (featuring Zhané)	Smith; Neufville	Dodge	4:24
4.	"It's a Party (The Ummah Remix)" (featuring Zhané)	Smith; Neufville	The Ummah (Jay Dee)	4:16
5.	"It's a Party" (Acapella Clean Version featuring Zhané)	Smith; Neufville		4:27
6.	"It's a Party (AllStar Remix)" (featuring SWV)	Smith; Melissa Elliott	Allen "Allstar" Gordon	4:10
Total length:				26:07

== Charts ==
Chart (1996)	Peak position
New Zealand (Recorded Music NZ)	34
Scottish Singles Sales (Official Charts)	75
UK Hip Hop/R&B (Official Charts)	4
UK Singles (Official Charts)	23
US Billboard Hot 100	52
US Dance Singles Sales (Billboard)	7
US Hot R&B/Hip-Hop Songs (Billboard)	27
US Hot Rap Songs (Billboard)	7
US Cash Box Top 100	44
