= The New Groove: The Blue Note Remix Project =

Compilation album by various artists
- Released: 1996
- Genre: Jazz
- Label: Blue Note

The New Groove: The Blue Note Remix Project is a 1996 Blue Note Records remix-compilation, released on that label. The AllMusic reviewer wrote: "almost all of the tracks work well, pointing out the direct lines connecting the groovy hipness of jazz with the best of modern hip-hop".

Professional ratings
Review scores
Source	Rating
Allmusic	4/5 stars
Los Angeles Times	3.5/4 stars

== Track listing ==
1. "Kofi" - Donald Byrd remixed by The Angel
2. "Hummin'" - Cannonball Adderley remixed by Large Professor
3. Living for the City" - Noel Pointer remixed by DJ Smash
4. "Listen Here" - Gene Harris remixed by Guru
5. "Friends and Strangers" - Ronnie Laws remixed by The LG Experience
6. "Down Here on the Ground" - Grant Green remixed by The Ummah
7. "Summer Song" - Ronnie Foster remixed by Diamond D
8. "Move Your Hand" - Dr. Lonnie Smith remixed by Michael Franti
9. "Sophisticated Hippie" -Horace Silver remixed by Easy Mo Bee
10. "Montara" - Bobby Hutcherson remixed by The Roots
11. "Mixed Feelings" [The New Groove] - Jacky Terrasson remixed by The Angel
