= When Disaster Strikes... =

Studio album by Busta Rhymes
- Released: September 16, 1997
- Studios: Soundtrack Studios, New York City; Daddy's House Studios, New York City; Sound Techniques, Boston, Massachusetts
- Genre: Hip hop
- Length: 76:07
- Labels: Flipmode; Violator; Elektra
- Producers: 8-Off; Buddah; Busta Rhymes; Clarence Dorsey; DJ Scratch; Easy Mo Bee; Epitome; Latief; Omar Glover; Rashad Smith; Rockwilder; Sean "Puffy" Combs; Shamello; Spliff Star; The Ummah

Busta Rhymes chronology
| The Coming (1996) | When Disaster Strikes... (1997) | The Imperial (1998) |

Busta Rhymes solo chronology
| The Coming (1996) | When Disaster Strikes... (1997) | Extinction Level Event: The Final World Front (1998) |

Singles from When Disaster Strikes
- 1. "Put Your Hands Where My Eyes Could See" Released: August 12, 1997; 2. "Dangerous" Released: November 18, 1997; 3. "Turn It Up (Remix) / Fire It Up" Released: May 15, 1998; 4. "One" Released: July 7, 1998

Professional ratings
Review scores
| Source | Rating |
|---|---|
| AllMusic | 4.5/5 stars |
| Christgau's Consumer Guide | (choice cut) |
| Entertainment Weekly | B |
| NME | 7/10 |
| Pitchfork | 8.2/10 (2008); 7.5/10 (2022) |
| RapReviews | 9/10 |
| Rolling Stone | 3/5 stars |
| The Rolling Stone Album Guide | 3.5/5 stars |
| The Source | 4/5 stars |
| Spin | 5/10 |

When Disaster Strikes... is the second studio album by American rapper and record producer Busta Rhymes, released by Elektra on September 16, 1997. The album follows the same theme as The Coming, the apocalypse. The album, upon its release, received mostly positive reviews, debuted at number three on the official US Billboard 200 album chart, and peaked at the top spot on the Top R&B Albums chart.

The album was supported by three singles: "Put Your Hands Where My Eyes Could See", "Dangerous", and "Turn It Up" – the latter two which found chart success on the US Billboard Hot 100 chart. The album's lead single, "Put Your Hands Where My Eyes Can See" (notable for its music video that lampooned the 1988 film Coming to America) earned a nomination for a Grammy Award for Best Rap Solo Performance at the 40th Grammy Awards in 1998. The album was certified platinum by the RIAA. Its second single, "Dangerous", earned Rhymes a third consecutive nomination for Best Rap Solo Performance at the 41st Grammy Awards the following year.

== Background ==
Busta Rhymes dedicated the album to late friend and fellow rapper the Notorious B.I.G., who had been an inspiration in the making of the album.

== Commercial performance ==
When Disaster Strikes... debuted at number three on the US Billboard 200 chart, selling 165,000 copies in its first week. This became Busta Rhymes's second US top-ten debut on the chart. On October 9, 1997, the album was certified platinum by the Recording Industry Association of America (RIAA) for shipments of over one million copies in the United States.

== Legacy ==
Fellow rapper and friend Talib Kweli included When Disaster Strikes in his list of the 100 best hip hop albums of all time.

For the 20th anniversary of the album, Busta Rhymes said he’s very pleased about “When Disaster Strikes“:

“I feel extremely great about that album. I feel great about all of my albums, and particularly that album. It was my sophomore jinx album where everybody was like, ‘We don’t wanna hear another album if he doesn’t switch it up,’ ‘Can he do it again?’ All of that talk was happening. But that album solidified my legacy.“

== Track listing ==
When Disaster Strikes... track listing
| No. | Title | Writer(s) | Producer(s) | Length |
|---|---|---|---|---|
| 1. | "Intro" | Trevor Smith | Busta Rhymes; Omar Glover; DJ Scratch | 4:45 |
| 2. | "The Whole World Lookin' at Me" | T. Smith; George Spivey | DJ Scratch | 3:26 |
| 3. | "Survival Hungry" | T. Smith; Spivey | DJ Scratch | 3:26 |
| 4. | "When Disaster Strikes" | T. Smith; Spivey | DJ Scratch | 3:25 |
| 5. | "So Hardcore" | T. Smith; James Yancey | The Ummah (Jay Dee) | 4:51 |
| 6. | "Get High Tonight" | T. Smith; Spivey; Harry Wayne Casey | DJ Scratch | 3:51 |
| 7. | "Turn It Up" | T. Smith; Al Green | Busta Rhymes | 4:11 |
| 8. | "Put Your Hands Where My Eyes Could See" | T. Smith; Darrol Durant; Roger Munroe | Shamello; Buddah; Epitome^{[a]} | 3:14 |
| 9. | "It's All Good" | T. Smith; Anthony Long | Latief | 3:02 |
| 10. | "There's Not a Problem My Squad Can't Fix" (featuring Jamal) | T. Smith; Jamal Phillips; Michael Cleveland | Busta Rhymes | 5:56 |
| 11. | "We Could Take It Outside" (featuring the Flipmode Squad) | T. Smith; Roger McNair; Cleveland Delaney Jr.; William Lewis; Wayne Notise; Leroy Jones^{[b]}; Rashia Fisher; Spivey; Alan Bergmann; Marilyn Bergmann; Michel Legrand | DJ Scratch | 4:47 |
| 12. | "Rhymes Galore" | T. Smith; Rashad Smith; Rufus Thomas; Jo Bridges; Mack Rice; Tom Nixon | Rashad Smith | 2:33 |
| 13. | "Things We Be Doin' for Money, Part 1" | T. Smith | Easy Mo Bee | 3:18 |
| 14. | "Things We Be Doin' for Money, Part 2" (featuring Rampage, Anthony Hamilton, and the Chosen Generation) | T. Smith; Angel Aguilar; Carl Dorsey | 8-Off; Clarence Dorsey^{[a]} | 4:56 |
| 15. | "One" (featuring Erykah Badu) | T. Smith; Erica Wright; Dana Stinson; Stevland Morris | Rockwilder | 4:38 |
| 16. | "Dangerous" | T. Smith; R. Smith; Henry Stone; Freddy Stonewall | Rashad Smith | 3:37 |
| 17. | "The Body Rock" (featuring Rampage, Sean "Puffy" Combs, and Mase) | T. Smith; Sean Combs | Sean "Puffy" Combs | 5:33 |
| 18. | "Get Off My Block" (featuring Lord Have Mercy) | T. Smith; Notise | DJ Scratch | 3:58 |
| 19. | "Preparation for the Final World Front (Outro)" | T. Smith | DJ Scratch | 2:31 |

=== Notes ===
- ^{^[a]} signifies a co-producer
- ^{^[b]} signifies an uncredited contribution
- On North American pressings of the album, "It's All Good" is excluded from the tracklist.
- A 1998 European re-issue replaces "Survival Hungry" with "Turn It Up (Remix) / Fire It Up" at track 3.

== Charts ==
=== Weekly charts ===
Weekly chart performance for When Disaster Strikes...
| Chart (1997) | Peak position |
|---|---|
| Dutch Albums (Album Top 100) | 73 |
| German Albums (Offizielle Top 100) | 62 |
| UK Albums (Official Charts) | 34 |
| US Billboard 200 | 3 |
| US Top R&B/Hip-Hop Albums (Billboard) | 1 |

2023 weekly chart performance for When Disaster Strikes...
| Chart (2023) | Peak position |
|---|---|
| Hungarian Physical Albums (MAHASZ) | 13 |

=== Year-end charts ===
1997 year-end chart performance for When Disaster Strikes...
| Chart (1997) | Position |
|---|---|
| US Billboard 200 | 96 |
| US Top R&B/Hip-Hop Albums (Billboard) | 26 |

1998 year-end chart performance for When Disaster Strikes...
| Chart (1998) | Position |
|---|---|
| US Billboard 200 | 96 |
| US Top R&B/Hip-Hop Albums (Billboard) | 46 |

== Certifications ==
Certifications for When Disaster Strikes...
| Region | Certification | Certified units/sales |
|---|---|---|
| United Kingdom (BPI) | Gold | 100,000^{^} |
| United States (RIAA) | Platinum | 1,000,000^{^} |
^{^} Shipments figures based on certification alone.

== See also ==
- List of number-one R&B albums of 1997 (U.S.)
