= Get Out!! =

2000 single by Busta Rhymes

Single by Busta Rhymes

from the album Anarchy
- Released: June 3, 2000
- Recorded: 1999–2000
- Genre: Hip hop
- Length: 3:04
- Label: Flipmode; Elektra
- Songwriters: Trevor Smith; Dominick Lamb; Darryl Sloan; Frank Loesser
- Producer: Nottz

Busta Rhymes singles chronology
"Everybody Come On" (1999)	"Get Out!!" (2000)	"Fire" (2000)

Music video
- "Get Out!!" on YouTube

"Get Out!!" is a song by American rapper Busta Rhymes. It was released as the lead single from his fourth studio album Anarchy on June 3, 2000, by Flipmode Entertainment and Elektra Records. The song peaked at number 35 on the US Hot R&B/Hip-Hop Songs chart, number 57 on the UK Singles Chart, while failing to chart on the Billboard Hot 100.

== Composition ==
"Get Out!!" was composed in 4/4 time and the key of F♯ minor, with a tempo of 91 beats per minute. It has a duration time of three minutes and four seconds.

== Charts ==
Chart (2000)	Peak position
UK Singles (Official Charts)	57
US Hot R&B/Hip-Hop Songs (Billboard)	35
US Bubbling Under Hot 100 (Billboard)	18
