= Fire (Busta Rhymes song) =

2000 single by Busta Rhymes

Single by Busta Rhymes

from the album Anarchy
- Released: July 29, 2000
- Recorded: 1999–2000
- Genre: Hip hop
- Length: 2:49
- Label: Flipmode; Elektra
- Songwriters: Trevor Smith; Nickolas Ashford; Valerie Simpson
- Producer: Busta Rhymes

Busta Rhymes singles chronology
"Get Out!!" (2000)	"Fire" (2000)	"What It Is" (2001)

Music video
- "Fire" on YouTube

"Fire" is a song by American rapper Busta Rhymes. It was released as the second single from his fourth studio album Anarchy on July 29, 2000, by Flipmode Entertainment and Elektra Records. The song peaked at number 67 on the US Hot R&B/Hip-Hop Songs chart, number 60 on the UK Singles Chart, while failing to chart on the Billboard Hot 100.

== Composition ==
"Fire" was composed in 4/4 time and the key of C♯ major, with a tempo of 93 beats per minute. It has a duration time of two minutes and forty-nine seconds.

== Charts ==
Chart (2000)	Peak position
UK Singles (Official Charts)	60
US Hot R&B/Hip-Hop Songs (Billboard)	67
US Hot Rap Songs (Billboard)	7
