= Do My Thing =

1997 single by Busta Rhymes

Single by Busta Rhymes

from the album The Coming
- Released: 1997
- Recorded: Summer 1995
- Studio: Soundtrack Studios, New York City
- Genre: Hip hop
- Length: 4:00; 3:39 (streaming version)
- Label: Flipmode; Elektra
- Songwriters: Trevor Smith Jr.; George Spivey
- Producer: DJ Scratch

Busta Rhymes singles chronology
"Rumble in the Jungle" (1997)	"Do My Thing" (1997)	"Put Your Hands Where My Eyes Could See" (1997)

"Do My Thing" is a song by American rapper Busta Rhymes. It was released as the third and last single from his debut studio album The Coming in 1997, by Flipmode Entertainment and Elektra Records. The song was written by Rhymes and producer DJ Scratch. Originally released as a promotional single in 1996 along with "Abandon Ship", which also appears on The Coming, the song was then issued as the third and last single from the album in the United Kingdom in 1997, where it peaked at number 39 on the UK Singles Chart.

== Composition ==
"Do My Thing" was composed in 4/4 time and the key of B minor, with a tempo of 82 beats per minute. It has a duration of four minutes.

== Critical reception ==
"Do My Thing" received positive reception with Daryl McIntosh of Albumism highlighting that the song along with the following song on The Coming, "Everything Remains Raw", "provide no distractions and illuminate how Busta's humor and knowledge can seep through a track while simultaneously highlighting his great rhyming".

== Charts ==
Chart (1997)	Peak position
UK Singles (OCC)	39
