= Woo-Hah!! Got You All in Check =

1996 single by Busta Rhymes

- US single version cover

Single by Busta Rhymes

from the album The Coming
- B-side: "Woo-Hah!! Got You All in Check" (remixes); "Everything Remains Raw"
- Released: 1996
- Recorded: Summer 1995
- Studio: The Music Palace, New York City
- Genre: Hip hop
- Length: 4:31
- Label: Flipmode; Elektra
- Songwriters: Trevor Smith; Rashad Smith
- Producers: Busta Rhymes; Rashad Smith

Busta Rhymes singles chronology
"The Points" (1995)	"Woo-Hah!! Got You All in Check" (1996)	"Woo-Hah!! Got You All in Check (The World Wide Remix)" (1996)

Music video
- "Woo Hah!! Got You All in Check" on YouTube

"Woo-Hah!! Got You All in Check" is a song by American rapper Busta Rhymes. It was released in 1996, by Flipmode Entertainment and Elektra Records as his debut solo single and the lead single from his debut studio album, The Coming (1996). The song was both written and produced by Rhymes and Rashad Smith. It contains additional vocals by Flipmode Squad member and Rhymes' cousin Rampage, credited as Rampage the Last Boy Scout. A critical and commercial success, "Woo-Hah!! Got You All in Check" peaked at number eight on the Billboard Hot 100. Outside of the United States, "Woo-Hah!! Got You All in Check" peaked within the top ten of the charts in New Zealand and the United Kingdom. In the United States, the song was released with several remixes of the song and "Everything Remains Raw", also appearing on The Coming, as its B-side. The single received a nomination for Best Rap Solo Performance at the 39th Grammy Awards, losing to "Hey Lover" by LL Cool J. In addition, its music video, directed by Hype Williams, received a nomination for Breakthrough Video at the 1996 MTV Video Music Awards.

Viewed as a classic, it has since become one of Rhymes' most famous and beloved songs. In 2008, it was ranked number 56 on VH1's "100 Greatest Songs of Hip Hop".

== Background ==
In a studio session with Rampage and record producer Rashad Smith, Smith went through his record collection and found a 1968 instrumental song titled "Space" from the Woman Is Sweeter soundtrack by Galt MacDermot. Rhymes told him that he wanted to use the sample for himself, and to put the record away and save it for him. Eventually Smith and Busta produced the instrumental for the song using the sample, but Rhymes could not come up with any lyrics. However, seven months later, as Rhymes listened to the Sugarhill Gang's 1980 song "8th Wonder", he found new inspiration through the lyric "Woo-Hah! Got them all in check", which he went on to interpolate as part of the chorus.

Rhymes reused parts of the lyrics from a freestyle battle he did in 1994 with rapper Ol' Dirty Bastard, who would later feature on the remix version of the song. While working on the song, Rhymes was also inspired by singer and record producer George Clinton and aesthetic influences from dancehall, reimagining the cadences of toasters he heard growing up in a Jamaican household and a community of Caribbean immigrants.

== Composition and lyrics ==
"Woo-Hah!! Got You All in Check" was composed in 4/4 time and the key of C♯ major, with a tempo of 92 beats per minute. It has a duration time of four minutes and thirty-one seconds. The song features "cleverly-written" lyrics with a "manic delivery" over an "infectious" instrumental. For each of the three verses, the last word in each lyric rhymes with one another.

Furthermore, Rhymes references his then-two year old son T'ziah Wood-Smith. ("Yes, I catch wreck and that's word on my seed").

== Critical reception ==
Neil Kulkarni from Melody Maker named "Woo-Hah!! Got You All in Check" Single of the Week, writing, "This is getting mad playlisting in the US right now, and it could be the record to bring East Coast hip hop bombing back to the charts over here. Formerly of the wicked Leaders of The New School, Busta's brilliantly hoarse delivery keeps up an incredible flow on this track, recalling the freestyle genius of Mad Skillz or Lord Finesse. But what makes huge crossover so inevitable is the most insanely catchy cartoon loop and a chorus destines to permanently scar the mind and enter the hip hop lexicon of dancefloor-detonating classics." In December 1996, Melody Maker ranked it number 48 in their list of "Singles of the Year". James Hyman from Music Week's RM Dance Update rated the song five out of five, adding, "Imagine the inane style of Biz Markie mixed up with a pinch of Leaders Of The New School, Ol' Dirty Bastard (who appears on one mix) plus phat production from the likes of DJ Scratch (EPMD) & J.D. (Pharcyde, De La Soul, A Tribe Called Quest, Slum Village) and you simply have the most boisterous, most infectious and freshest rap single of the year." Retrospectively, Daryl McIntosh of Albumism wrote that "Busta Rhymes cemented himself as a household name, by helping to add new dimensions to both the look and sound of hip-hop. […] Busta was even more energetic than we had seen and heard on “Scenario” and the "Flava in Ya Ear" reworking. His rhymes […] jumped through the speakers to connect with listeners, who still regard the rhymes as an all-time go-to quotable."

== Music video ==
The official music video for "Woo-Hah!! Got You All in Check" was directed by American director Hype Williams and designed by visual artist and designer Ron Norsworthy. It begins with the first few lyrics and part of the hook of the songs B-side Everything Remains Raw, and features cameos from Spliff Star, Q-Tip and Ali Shaheed Muhammad of A Tribe Called Quest, Consequence, Onyx, and Jam Master Jay. The music video has become one of his most popular and very influential in both the hip hop and pop culture.

Daryl McIntosh of Albumism called the music video "equally entertaining [as the song], as Busta was dressed in bright colors to correspond with vibrant backgrounds, which was a welcome break from the gloomier imagery that prevailed during the 'grimey era'".

== Track listing ==
=== United Kingdom 12-inch single ===
Side A
No.	Title	Writer(s)	Producer(s)	Length
1.	"Woo-Hah!! Got You All in Check" (Album Radio Edit)	Trevor Smith; Rashad Smith	Busta Rhymes; Rashad Smith	4:41
2.	"Woo-Hah!! Got You All in Check (Fila Mix 3)"	Smith; Smith	Fila Brazillia	4:55
3.	"Woo-Hah!! Got You All in Check (The DJ Scratch Albany Projects Remix)" (Radio Edit)	Smith; Smith	DJ Scratch	4:10

Side B
No.	Title	Writer(s)	Producer(s)	Length
1.	"Woo-Hah!! Got You All in Check (Origin Unknown Mix)"	Smith; Smith	Origin Unknown	6:44
2.	"Woo-Hah!! Got You All in Check (Fila Mix 4)"	Smith; Smith	Fila Brazillia	6:39
4.	"Woo-Hah!! Got You All in Check (The Jay-Dee Other Shit Remix)" (Radio Edit)	Smith; Smith	The Ummah (Jay Dee)	4:10
Total length:				31:19

=== United States 12-inch single ===
Side A
No.	Title	Writer(s)	Producer(s)	Length
1.	"Woo-Hah!! Got You All in Check" (Album Version)	Trevor Smith; Rashad Smith	Busta Rhymes; Rashad Smith	4:40
2.	"Woo-Hah!! Got You All in Check (The World Wide Remix)" (featuring Ol' Dirty Bastard)	Smith; Russell Jones; Smith	Busta Rhymes; Rashad Smith	4:25
3.	"Woo-Hah!! Got You All in Check (The Jay-Dee Bounce Remix)"	Smith; Smith	The Ummah (Jay Dee)	4:42
4.	"Woo-Hah!! Got You All in Check (The DJ Scratch Albany Projects Remix)"	Smith; Smith	DJ Scratch	4:48

Side B
No.	Title	Writer(s)	Producer(s)	Length
1.	"Everything Remains Raw" (Album Version)	Smith; Osten Harvey Jr.	Easy Mo Bee	3:43
2.	"Woo-Hah!! Got You All in Check (The World Wide Remix)" (Instrumental)		Busta Rhymes; Rashad Smith	4:18
3.	"Woo-Hah!! Got You All in Check (The Jay-Dee Bounce Remix)" (Instrumental)		The Ummah (Jay Dee)	4:42
4.	"Woo-Hah!! Got You All in Check (The Jay-Dee Other Shit Remix)"	Smith; Smith	The Ummah (Jay Dee)	4:42
5.	"Everything Remains Raw" (Album Version Instrumental)		Easy Mo Bee	2:38
Total length:				38:38

=== United States CD single ===
No.	Title	Writer(s)	Producer(s)	Length
1.	"Woo-Hah!! Got You All in Check"	Trevor Smith; Rashad Smith	Busta Rhymes; Rashad Smith	4:40
2.	"Woo-Hah!! Got You All in Check (The World Wide Remix)" (featuring Ol' Dirty Bastard)	Smith; Russell Jones; Smith	Busta Rhymes; Rashad Smith	4:25
3.	"Woo-Hah!! Got You All in Check (The Jay-Dee Bounce Remix)"	Smith; Smith	The Ummah (Jay Dee)	4:42
4.	"Woo-Hah!! Got You All in Check (The DJ Scratch Albany Projects Remix)"	Smith; Smith	DJ Scratch	4:48
5.	"Everything Remains Raw"	Smith; Osten Harvey Jr.	Easy Mo Bee	3:43
6.	"Woo-Hah!! Got You All in Check (The World Wide Remix)" (Instrumental)		Busta Rhymes; Rashad Smith	4:18
7.	"Woo-Hah!! Got You All in Check (The Jay-Dee Bounce Remix)" (Instrumental)		The Ummah (Jay Dee)	4:42
8.	"Woo-Hah!! Got You All in Check (The Jay-Dee Other Shit Remix)"	Smith; Smith	The Ummah (Jay Dee)	4:42
9.	"Everything Remains Raw" (Instrumental)		Easy Mo Bee	3:37
Total length:				39:37

== The World Wide Remix ==
"Woo-Hah!! Got You All in Check (The World Wide Remix)"

Single by Busta Rhymes featuring Ol' Dirty Bastard
- A-side: "Woo-Hah!! Got You All in Check"
- B-side: "Everything Remains Raw"
- Released: February 27, 1996
- Recorded: 1995–1996
- Studio: The Music Palace, Long Island
- Genre: Alternative hip-hop
- Length: 4:25
- Label: Flipmode; Elektra
- Songwriters: Trevor Smith; Russell Jones; Rashad Smith
- Producers: Busta Rhymes; Rashad Smith

Busta Rhymes singles chronology
"Woo-Hah!! Got You All in Check" (1996)	"Woo-Hah!! Got You All in Check (The World Wide Remix)" (1996)	"It's a Party" (1996)

Ol' Dirty Bastard singles chronology
"Shimmy Shimmy Ya" (1995)	"Woo-Hah!! Got You All in Check (The World Wide Remix)" (1996)	"Hip Hop Drunkies" (1997)

Music video
- "Woo Hah!! Got You All in Check (The World Wide Remix)" on YouTube

"The World Wide Remix" to "Woo-Hah!! Got You All in Check" features American rapper Ol' Dirty Bastard and was released as the B-Side to the United States release of the song. It was written by Busta Rhymes, Ol' Dirty Bastard and Rashad Smith and produced by Rhymes and Smith. It features a new beat and new verses, plus a re-worked chorus. Although the song was originally not included on any album it is part of the 25th Anniversary Super Deluxe Edition of The Coming.

=== Background ===
Rhymes and ODB were very close friends and often hung out which led the collaboration to happen naturally. They later went on to collaborate on songs such as Where's Your Money? in 2005 and Slow Flow in 2020, both released posthumously after ODB's death in 2004, with the latter containing sampled vocals from him.

=== Composition ===
"The World Wide Remix" to "Woo-Hah!! Got You All in Check" was written by its original contributors, Busta Rhymes and Rashad Smith alongside Ol' Dirty Bastard and produced by the first two. It is composed in 4/4 time and the key of C Minor, with a tempo of 89 beats per minute. It has a duration time of four minutes and twenty-five seconds.

=== Music video ===
The official music video for "The World Wide Remix" was directed by Michael Lucero and features the two rappers as they wear straitjackets and are imprisoned in a padded room.

== Charts ==
=== Weekly charts ===
Chart (1996)	Peak position
Australia (ARIA)	96
Germany (GfK)	42
Netherlands (Dutch Top 40)	27
Netherlands (Single Top 100)	20
New Zealand (Recorded Music NZ)	9
Scottish Singles Sales (Official Charts)	36
Sweden (Sverigetopplistan)	13
UK Singles (Official Charts)	8
UK Dance (Official Charts)	3
UK Hip Hop/R&B (Official Charts)	2
UK Club Chart (Music Week)	37
US Billboard Hot 100	8
US Dance Singles Sales (Billboard)	1
US Hot R&B/Hip-Hop Songs (Billboard)	6
US Hot Rap Singles (Billboard)	1
US Rhythmic Airplay (Billboard)	24
US Cash Box Top 100	7

=== Year-end charts ===
Chart (1996)	Position
New Zealand (Recorded Music NZ)	39
US Billboard Hot 100	57
US Hot Rap Singles (Billboard)	8

== Certifications ==
Region	Certification	Certified units/sales
United States (RIAA)	Platinum	1,000,000
