= Rockwilder =

American producer and songwriter (born 1971)

- Also known as: Rockwilder
- Born: Dana Stinson; February 2, 1971 (age 55)
- Origin: New York City, U.S.
- Genres: R&B; hip hop
- Occupations: Record producer; songwriter
- Years active: 1993–present
- Labels: Muzic Park; Universal; F-5 Productions, Inc.

Dana Stinson (born February 2, 1971), more commonly known as Rockwilder, is an American hip hop producer and songwriter best known for his work with Redman, Jay-Z, LL Cool J, Busta Rhymes, Xzibit, and Janet Jackson. He has appeared on every Redman studio album since 1994.

== Biography ==
Stinson began his career in 1993, working with close friend Redman in New York City. He contributed intro song "Bobyahead2dis" to his classic 1994 sophomore album Dare Iz a Darkside, while also producing numerous Redman album tracks, songs for Redman-endorsed proteges, and productions for other collaborators, such as Method Man, Busta Rhymes, and Erick Sermon. In 1997, he produced third single "One" for Busta Rhymes and Erykah Badu from 1997 album When Disaster Strikes.... He later produced Method Man and Redman's 1999 single "Da Rockwilder", which became a rap staple after peaking in the top 15 of the Billboard Hot Rap Songs chart. He ended the 1990s decade producing songs for Jay-Z's Vol. 3... Life and Times of S. Carter, including lead single and top 10 rap hit "Do It Again".

By 2000, Stinson's production duties began to branch out from the genre of hip-hop, as his productions were sought after by crossover R&B artists seeking additional radio airplay from hip-hop fused formats including: Janet Jackson (co-writing and producing six songs from 2001 album All For You, including final airplay single "Come On Get Up", explicit album cut "Warmth" from 2004 album Damita Jo, as well as various radio edits and single remixes); Maxwell (various mixes of lead single "Get to Know Ya" from 2001 album Now); Bell Biv DeVoe (lead single "Da Hot Shit (Aight)" from 2001 comeback album BBD); Mary J. Blige ("Keep It Moving" from 2001 album No More Drama); Christina Aguilera (Stripped lead single "Dirrty" and the Grammy-winning 2001 Moulin Rouge! soundtrack remake of "Lady Marmalade"); Pink ("Get the Party Started/Sweet Dreams", the B-side to lead single "Get the Party Started" from 2001 sophomore album, Missundaztood); Me’Shell NdegeOcello (remix to lead single "Pocketbook" from acclaimed 2002 album Cookie: The Anthropological Mixtape); Solange ("Wonderland" from 2002 debut album Solo Star); Mya ("Why You Gotta Look So Good?" from 2003 album Moodring); Kelis (hit European single "In Public" featuring Nas from 2003 album Tasty); Destiny's Child (a Missy Elliott remix of hit single "Bootylicious" to promote 2001 projects Carmen: A Hip Hopera and This Is the Remix, as well as "If" and "Free" from 2004 album Destiny Fulfilled); and various productions for Kelly Rowland, Musiq Soulchild, and Tyrese.

== Selected songwriting credits ==
Non-produced songwriting contributions.

Title	Year	Artist	Album
"Doves in the Wind" (featuring Kendrick Lamar)	2017	SZA	Ctrl
"Self Righteous"	2020	Bryson Tiller	Trapsoul (Deluxe Edition)

== Awards and nominations ==
Year	Ceremony	Award	Result	Ref
2001	BMI Urban Awards	2000-2001 Top Producers Award	Won	
