= The Coming =

Studio album by Busta Rhymes
- Released: March 26, 1996
- Recorded: 1994–95
- Studio: Soundtrack Studios, New York City; The Music Palace, New York City; Nipskab Lab, New York City
- Genre: East Coast hip-hop
- Length: 63:50
- Label: Flipmode; Violator; Elektra
- Producer: Busta Rhymes; DJ Scratch; Easy Mo Bee; Rashad Smith; Rick St. Hilaire; The Ummah; The Vibe Chemist Backspin

Busta Rhymes chronology
T.I.M.E. (The Inner Mind's Eye) (1993)	The Coming (1996)	When Disaster Strikes... (1997)

Busta Rhymes solo chronology
The Coming (1996)	When Disaster Strikes... (1997)

Singles from The Coming
- 1. "Woo-Hah!! Got You All in Check" Released: January 7, 1996; 2. "It's a Party" Released: June 25, 1996; 3. "Do My Thing" Released: 1997

The Coming is the debut studio album by the American rapper and record producer Busta Rhymes. It was released on March 26, 1996, by Flipmode Entertainment and Elektra Records. The album contains contributions by the Def Squad members Redman, Keith Murray, and Jamal; as well as Q-Tip, Zhané, Leaders of the New School, and several Flipmode Squad members. It was produced by DJ Scratch, Easy Mo Bee, and the Ummah, among others. It serves as Rhymes's first solo album after the breakup of Leaders of the New School two years prior, and his first full-length project after numerous guest appearances on other songs with artists such as A Tribe Called Quest, the Notorious B.I.G., Heavy D and the Boyz, and Mary J. Blige.

The album reached number six on the Billboard 200 chart. Although, according to the Recording Industry Association of America (RIAA), The Coming was certified platinum on January 13, 1999, Rhymes has stated that the album went platinum within the same year of its release. The lead single, "Woo-Hah!! Got You All in Check" reached number eight on the Billboard Hot 100 chart in 1996, and earned Rhymes his first nomination for Best Rap Solo Performance at the 39th Grammy Awards. The second single, "It's a Party" (featuring Zhané) would also make the chart, peaking at number 52. In commemoration of its 25th anniversary, a super deluxe edition of The Coming featuring remixes, instrumentals and acapellas was released to all streaming platforms on April 16, 2021, by Rhino.

== Background and recording ==
"I was like the first artist to really start rhyming on everyone else's record. And I was doing that because it was a quick way to feed my kid. That's what was going on until, you know, I got to a place where I felt comfortable enough with doing a solo album."

– Busta Rhymes, on his many guest appearances

The Coming serves as Busta Rhymes's first solo album after the break up of his former group Leaders of the New School. As his group had just broken up and he had his first son, he needed a source of income to provide a secure life for his son. He then got offered an Elektra Records solo deal by Dante Ross and Chris Lighty but was hesitant about accepting the deal due to his concerns regarding if he would be able to captivate listeners for the length of an entire album by himself. To get more comfortable with recording without his former group Leaders of the New School, he then appeared on numerous other artists' records. He did so to experiment with and find his own sound. His guest appearances at the time included A Tribe Called Quest's "Oh My God" and Craig Mack's "Flava in Ya Ear (Remix)", among others. Rhymes contributed hugely to the ongoing trend of guest appearances in hip hop.

The initial recording sessions began in late 1994 in Los Angeles, where Rhymes was shooting for the movie Higher Learning, directed by John Singleton. When shooting ended, he also flew to Atlanta where he worked with record producer Dallas Austin in his new recording studio D.A.R.P. (Dallas Austin Recording Projects). Rhymes was worried about his responsibility and the future of his family, unsure whether he was capable of making a debut that would serve as the foundation of his solo career. Back in New York City, he moved between three recording studios, The Music Palace, Chung King Studios and Soundtrack Studios, to record music. After he sourced beats, he would write solely in the studio, afraid to lose lines or ideas for flows. Everything, including arrangements, concepts, choruses and verses, was written down on paper. Most of the time, he worked alone in the studio, with no one to hype him up before or after he got in the booth.

"He was creating a sound that nobody else was doing. I loved it, and it reminded me of that hard-slapping, creative way of sampling records that Q-Tip was already doing, and Large Professor, Pete Rock, and Preemo. But he sounded closer to Q-Tip more than anybody else. Tip was one of my favorite producers at the time, and Dilla sounded like a young, iller version of Q-Tip. That was it. I just fell in love with his work."

– Busta Rhymes, on frequent collaborator J Dilla

Up until this point, Rhymes had problems with recording a full album on his own and sought help from his frequent collaborator, the rapper Q-Tip. Rhymes was mentored by Q-Tip, who gave him advice, motivated him and played a role in choosing the direction for the album. With his help and after several months of frustration, he finally came up with the idea that would become the skit after "It's a Party". In 1995, Q-Tip also introduced Rhymes to the then-unknown record producer J Dilla, who was known as Jay Dee at the time and had his biggest credits on the hip hop group the Pharcyde's second studio album Labcabincalifornia. Dilla went on to produce two tracks on the album, "Still Shining" and "Keep It Movin'", as well as numerous other tracks by Rhymes in the following years.

Rhymes recorded a track for the album called "The Ugliest" with the rapper the Notorious B.I.G. over a beat by Dilla. The rappers Method Man and Nas were also set to appear on the track which because of scheduling conflict did not come about. Because of subliminal disses about 2Pac by Biggie, the song was ultimately not included on the album. Biggie's verse would later be reused on "Dangerous MC's", a posse cut on the posthumously released 1999 album Born Again, also featuring Rhymes, Mark Curry and Snoop Dogg, while the song itself was released in a new form on Rhymes' 2003 mixtape "Surrender".

Rhymes dedicated the album to the memory of his first and late son, Tahiem Jr, and friends Ratto, Big Joe and Love.

== Concept and title ==
Describing the concept of the album's title, Busta Rhymes said, "The Coming, I just felt, was such a general yet specific statement that the level of meaning is so powerful... The coming of what? When is it coming? How is it coming? Where is it coming from? Why is it coming?"

=== Cover art ===
The cover art of The Coming was shot by Dean Karr. It displays a framed image of Rhymes with his mouth stretched wide, screaming. His locks are fanned out wildly behind his head with a white dove perched above him. The cover art is blurred and foggy.

== Music and lyrics ==
As Rhymes was not comfortable with including lyrics about his personal life and struggles, the album was very short on autobiographical or personal topics and lyrics.

The "epic," "extended and extremely busy" intro of The Coming contains two beat change ups and "commentary on wack rappers and the state of the rap game" from Rhymes. Rhymes "dedicates [the last] portion [of the song] to all the 'niggas that keep falling', as a clever ODB vocal snippet plays behind him, emulating the sound of a man screaming as he falls from extremely high heights to his death." The appearances of Flipmode Squad members Lord Have Mercy and Rampage on the track have been described as a "cartoonishly monstrous prologue". The "first real song" on the album, "Do My Thing", features a "funky, heavy-bass beat" by producer DJ Scratch. Rhymes' verses on the track have been described as "ridiculously witty." The track ends with a short skit that "re-iterates how Busta feels about wack rappers," as Rhymes can be heard "whipping" somebody for "talking shit," and copying his lyrics. The skit has been removed from digital versions of the album. The "grimy, nocturnal" instrumental with "heavy drums" of "Everything Remains Raw" was produced by Easy Mo Bee. Many of Rhymes' lyrics on the track were previously used on his freestyle on Funkmaster Flex's 1995 mixtape The Mix Tape, Volume 1: 60 Minutes of Funk. Both the previous track, "Do My Thing", and "Everything Remains Raw" have been said to "provide no distractions and illuminate how Busta's humor and knowledge can seep through a track while simultaneously highlighting his great rhyming".

Over the "energetic, stripped-down instrumental" of "Abandon Ship" produced by Rhymes, he and his cousin Rampage "showcase their chemistry on the mic with one hyped-up, razor-sharp lyric after another". The song's refrain has been described as "catchy-as-hell." After "Abandon Ship" ends, an excerpt of Galt MacDermot 1969 song "Space", which gets sampled on the following track, can be heard. This interlude "helps to bring the energy down from 'Abandon Ship'". The fifth track and lead single "Woo-Hah!! Got You All in Check" features "cleverly-written" lyrics with a "manic delivery" over an "infectious" instrumental by Rhymes and Rashad Smith. Rhymes builds the chorus around a line from the 1980 Sugar Hill Gang song "8th Wonder". For each of the three verses, the last word in each lyric rhymes with one another. The "groovy," "clearly tailor-made for radio airplay" instrumental for R&B crossover "It's a Party" was produced by Easy Mo Bee and features R&B duo Zhané, who "provide some smooth, seductive lyrics [...], while Busta plays the guy who lyrically flirts with them in-between their short verses and chorus". The song is followed by a skit featuring a "quick throw away verse," as most of the verse contains Rhymes ad libbing, and multiple shoutouts to Saddam Hussein. The skit was the first track recorded for the album and has been removed from digital versions of the album.

The "dark jazz textured backdrop" of "Hot Fudge" produced by the Vibe Chemist Backspin finds Rhymes "calming down just enough to sound sinister and slightly scary". The song is followed by a skit about a Jamaican woman getting oral sex, "with no intentions of paying her sexual partner back the one she owes him." The "moody" and "nocturnal" instrumental of "Ill Vibe" was produced by the featured Q-Tip. The chemistry between Rhymes and Q-Tip has been described as similar to that of Method Man and Redman. In the next track, "Flipmode Squad Meets Def Squad", the Def Squad members Jamal, Redman and Keith Murray engage against the Flipmode Squad members Rampage, Lord Have Mercy and Rhymes in a rap battle with no chorus or hook over a backdrop produced by the Vibe Chemist Backspin. The song is Rhymes' "attempt to create another memorable posse record on par with 'Scenario' by A Tribe Called Quest featuring Leaders of the New School (the group Rhymes was a part of), and [...] 'Headbanger' (by the Hit Squad, the group from which the Def Squad emerged)" and serves "as the formal introduction" of Rhymes' Flipmode Squad.

The "spacey, synth-assisted production" of "Still Shining" by producer J Dilla goes right "into a short but sweet acknowledgment of Busta's own lyrical talents as an MC." The chorus interpolates one of Rhymes' lines on the remix of A Tribe Called Quest's "Scenario". In an interlude between "Still Shining" and the following track "Keep It Movin'", Rhymes "verbally scar[es] the shit out of his LONS [Leaders of the New School] peers to get themselves out of their retirement comfort zone to get to the studio." The "bluesy" instrumental of "The Finish Line" was produced by DJ Scratch. The song contains Rhymes rapping about the untrue lifestyle of a man and explains how it "will soon lead to his demise." In the outro, "The End of the World", Rhymes re-uses one of the beats from the intro and uses it to "show gratitude to his supporting fans and offers up a few parting words about using your time wisely." The track is followed by a short skit in which a man can be heard, "who's apparently on his death bed full of regret for not using his time wisely and accomplishing all things he wanted out of life. Then [...] the man slips into death, travels through the 'dark tunnel' [...] [as a] portion of the medieval classic "O Fortuna" plays, while a distorted devilish voice laughs, which suggests that the regretful man went to hell." The outro has been described as "putting a super dark ending on what was mostly a light-hearted listen."

== Singles ==
"Woo-Hah!! Got You All in Check" was released as the first official single from The Coming on January 7, 1996. In the United States, the song was released on February 27, 1996, and included a notable remix version featuring Ol' Dirty Bastard. Rhymes' cousin, the Flipmode Squad member Rampage, contributes additional vocals to the standard version and is credited as an official guest artist on some releases of the song. The song reached the top ten in the charts of the United Kingdom, United States and New Zealand, and also charted in Sweden, the Netherlands, Scotland, Germany and Australia.

"It's a Party", featuring the American R&B duo Zhané, was released as the second official single from the album on June 25, 1996. Upon its release, the single peaked at number 52 on the Billboard Hot 100 in the United States and peaked at number 4 on the Hip-Hop Singles Chart in the United Kingdom. It also charted at number 7 on both the Dance Singles Sales and Hot Rap Songs charts in the US, and also charted in New Zealand, Scotland, and the United Kingdom. "Do My Thing" was released as the third and last official single from the album in 1997, outside of the United States. The song was previously issued as a promotional single. In the United Kingdom, it peaked at number 39 on the UK singles chart.

=== Promotional singles ===
"Everything Remains Raw" was released as the first promotional single from The Coming on February 27, 1996, as the B-side to the album's lead single "Woo-Hah!! Got You All in Check. "Do My Thing" and "Abandon Ship" featuring Rampage the Last Boy Scout were released together as the second and third promotional singles from the album in 1996. "Do My Thing" would later be released as an official single from the album. "Ill Vibe" featuring the American rapper Q-Tip was released as the fourth and last promotional single from the album on June 25, 1996, as the B-side to the album's second single "It's a Party" featuring Zhané.

== Critical reception ==
Professional ratings
Review scores
Source	Rating
AllMusic	4.5/5 stars
Christgau's Consumer Guide	(choice cut)
Entertainment Weekly	B+
Muzik	5/5 stars
Q	3/5 stars
The Rolling Stone Album Guide	3.5/5 stars
The Source	4/5

The Coming was met with generally positive reviews upon its release. Daryl McIntosh of Albumism wrote that "the heart and soul of the album is found on songs where Busta doesn't have to stand out amongst a large group [...] like "Everything Remains Raw", [...] and "Do My Thing". [They] provide no distractions and illuminate how Busta's humor and knowledge can seep through a track while simultaneously highlighting his great rhyming ability." He added that "The Coming did everything you could ask for from a debut album," and went on to say that "The Coming was one of the all-time great debut LPs in hip-hop. Busta's first verse, first single, and first album all stand as testaments to the fact that he is one of hip-hop's elite artists and the perennial main event.

== Commercial performance ==
Upon its release, the album charted at number 6 on the Billboard 200, alongside topping the Top R&B/Hip-Hop Albums chart. It would eventually be certified Platinum by the Recording Industry Association of America (RIAA) for equivalent sales of 1,000,000 units in the United States. By the end of 1996, the album was positioned at number 105 on the Billboard 200 and number 23 on the Top R&B/Hip-Hop Albums chart. In Canada, although the album did not chart, it would eventually be certified Gold by Music Canada(MC) for equivalent sales of 50,000 units in the country. In Germany, the album charted at number 80 on the Offizielle Top 100. In Sweden, the album charted at number 39 on the Sverigetopplistan chart. In the United Kingdom, the album charted at number 48 on the UK Albums Chart.

== Track listing ==
Credits adapted from the album's liner notes.

No.	Title	Writer(s)	Producer(s)	Length
1.	"The Coming (Intro)"	Trevor Smith; Rick St. Hilaire; George Spivey	St. Hilaire; DJ Scratch	4:32
2.	"Do My Thing"	T. Smith; Spivey	DJ Scratch	4:00
3.	"Everything Remains Raw"	T. Smith; Osten Harvey, Jr.	Easy Mo Bee	3:41
4.	"Abandon Ship" (featuring Rampage the Last Boy Scout)	T. Smith; Roger "Rampage the Last Boy Scout" McNair	Busta Rhymes	6:02
5.	"Woo-Hah!! Got You All in Check"	T. Smith; Rashad Smith	Busta Rhymes; R. Smith	4:31
6.	"It's a Party" (featuring Zhané)	T. Smith; Renee Neufville	Easy Mo Bee	5:53
7.	"Hot Fudge"	T. Smith; Marlon "The Vibe Chemist Backspin" King	The Vibe Chemist Backspin	5:09
8.	"Ill Vibe" (featuring Q-Tip)	T. Smith; Kamaal Fareed	The Ummah (Q-Tip)	3:29
9.	"Flipmode Squad Meets Def Squad" (featuring Jamal, Redman, Keith Murray, Rampage the Last Boy Scout, and Lord Have Mercy)	T. Smith; Jamal Phillips; Reggie Noble; Keith Murray; McNair; Wayne "Lord Have Mercy" Notise; King	The Vibe Chemist Backspin	8:10
10.	"Still Shining"	T. Smith; James "Jay Dee" Yancey	The Ummah (Jay Dee)	2:57
11.	"Keep It Movin'" (featuring Dinco, Milo, and Charlie Brown)	T. Smith; James "Dinco" Jackson; Sheldon "Milo" Scott; Bryan Higgins; Yancey	The Ummah (Jay Dee)	7:32
12.	"The Finish Line"	T. Smith; Spivey	DJ Scratch	5:06
13.	"The End of the World (Outro)"	T. Smith; St. Hilaire	St. Hilaire	2:48
Total length:				63:50

=== Note ===
- On some releases, Rampage the Last Boy Scout is credited as an official guest artist on "Woo-Hah!! Got You All in Check".

=== Sample credits ===
- "The Coming (Intro)" contains a sample of "Goin' Down", written and performed by Ol' Dirty Bastard.
- "Everything Remains Raw" and "Abandon Ship" contains samples of "(Don't Want No) Woman", written by Lee Michaels, Bartholomew Smith-Frost, Percy Mayfield, and Ray Charles, as performed by Lee Michaels; and contains samples of "Space", written and performed by Galt MacDermot.
- "Woo-Hah!! Got You All in Check" contains a sample of "Space", written and performed by Galt MacDermot; and an interpolation of "8th Wonder", written by Cheryl Cook, Clifton Chase, Guy O'Brien, Michael Wright, Ronald LaPread, and Sylvia Robinson, as performed by the Sugarhill Gang.
- "It's a Party" contains samples of "Fun", written by Regi Hargis and performed by Brick; and "Hydra", written by Grover Washington Jr., Brandon Barnes, and Brian McKnight, as performed by Grover Washington Jr.
- "Ill Vibe" contains a sample of "Dizzy", written by Tommy Roe and Freddy Weller, as performed by Hugo Montenegro.
- "Flipmode Squad Meets Def Squad" contains interpolations of "Rated 'R'", written by Reginald Noble and James Brown, as performed by Redman; and "Lick the Balls", written by Eric Sadler, James Boxley III, and Ricky Walters, as performed by Slick Rick.
- "Still Shining" contains a sample of "Where Is Love", written by Lionel Bart, as performed by Cal Tjader; and an interpolation of "Scenario (Remix)", written by Kamaal Fareed, Bryan Higgins, James Jackson, Ali Shaheed Muhammad, Trevor Smith, and Malik Taylor, as performed by A Tribe Called Quest featuring Kid Hood and Leaders of the New School.
- "Keep It Movin'" contains samples of "Recess", written and performed by Eddie Harris; and "Ecstasy", written and performed by Ohio Players.
- "The Finish Line'" contains a sample of "Street Scene: Dark Alleys", written and performed by Arif Mardin.
- "The End of the World (Outro)" contains samples of "Fanfare for the Common Man", written by Aaron Copland; and "O Fortuna", written by Carl Orff.

== Personnel ==
=== Performance ===
- Busta Rhymes – lead vocals
- Rampage the Last Boy Scout – guest vocals (tracks 4, 9), additional vocals (tracks 1, 5), skit vocals (track 11)
- Zhané – guest vocals (track 6)
- Q-Tip – guest vocals (track 8)
- Jamal – guest vocals (track 9)
- Redman – guest vocals (track 9)
- Keith Murray – guest vocals (track 9)
- Lord Have Mercy – guest vocals (track 9), additional vocals (track 1)
- Dinco D – guest vocals (track 11 as part of the Leaders of the New School)
- Milo – guest vocals (track 11 as part of the Leaders of the New School)
- Charlie Brown – guest vocals (track 11 as part of the Leaders of the New School)
- Spliff Star – skit vocals (track 13)
- Wade Thoren – skit vocals (track 13)

=== Technical ===
- Tom Coyne – mastering
- Rick St. Hilaire – mixing (tracks 1, 3, 5, 11, 13), recording (tracks 1, 3–5, 9, 11, 13)
- Busta Rhymes – mixing, arrangement (tracks 2, 4, 7, 9, 11, 12)
- DJ Scratch – mixing, arrangement (track 2, 12)
- Easy Mo Bee – mixing, arrangement (tracks 3, 6)
- Andy Blakelock – mixing (track 4), recording (track 6)
- The Vibe Chemist Backspin – mixing, recording, arrangement (track 7)
- Q-Tip – mixing, arrangement (track 8)
- Jay Dee – mixing, arrangement (track 10)
- Peter Darmi – mixing (track 10), recording (tracks 2, 8, 10, 12)
- Mike Scielzi – recording assistance (tracks 2, 4, 6, 10, 12)
- Vinnie Nicoletti – recording assistance (tracks 3–5, 9, 11)

== Charts ==
=== Weekly charts ===
Chart (1996)	Peak position
German Albums (Offizielle Top 100)	80
Swedish Albums (Sverigetopplistan)	39
UK Albums (OCC)	48
US Billboard 200	6
US Top R&B/Hip-Hop Albums (Billboard)	1

=== Year-end charts ===
Chart (1996)	Position
US Billboard 200	105
US Top R&B/Hip-Hop Albums (Billboard)	23

== Certifications ==
Region	Certification	Certified units/sales
Canada (Music Canada)	Gold	50,000^{^}
United States (RIAA)	Platinum	1,000,000^{^}
^{^} Shipments figures based on certification alone.

== See also ==
- List of Billboard number-one R&B albums of 1996
