= Dangerous (Busta Rhymes song) =

1997 single by Busta Rhymes

Single by Busta Rhymes

from the album When Disaster Strikes...
- B-side: "You Won't Tell, I Won't Tell "; "Coming Off"
- Released: November 18, 1997
- Recorded: 1997
- Studio: Soundtrack Studios, New York City
- Genre: Hip hop
- Length: 3:37
- Label: Flipmode; Elektra
- Songwriters: Trevor Smith; Rashad Smith; Henry Stone; Freddy Stonewall
- Producer: Rashad Smith

Busta Rhymes singles chronology
"Put Your Hands Where My Eyes Could See" (1997)	"Dangerous" (1997)	"Curious" (1998)

Music video
- "Dangerous" on YouTube

"Dangerous" is a song by American rapper Busta Rhymes. It was released as the second single from his second studio album When Disaster Strikes... on November 18, 1997, by Flipmode Entertainment and Elektra Records. The song was written by Rhymes and its producer Rashad Smith. Since the song contains a sample of the Extra T's 1982 song "E.T. Boogie", two of the song's writers, Henry Stone and Freddy Stonewall, are also credited as songwriters on "Dangerous".

Peaking at #9 on the Billboard Hot 100, it was nominated for the Grammy Award for Best Rap Solo Performance at the 41st Grammy Awards in 1999, but lost to "Gettin' Jiggy wit It" by Will Smith. The video was directed by Hype Williams.

== Composition and lyrics ==
"Dangerous" was composed in 4/4 time and the key of B-minor, with a tempo of 103 beats per minute. It has a duration time of three minutes and thirty-seven seconds. The chorus of the song (This is serious/We could make you delirious/You should have a healthy fear of us/'Cuz too much of us is dangerous) was taken from a 1980s PSA produced by Kids Corner Ltd of Colorado Springs, Colorado that warned children about the danger of loose prescription medications, called We’re Not Candy. The rhythm track was sampled from the 1982 song "E.T. Boogie" by the Extra T's.

== Music video ==
The video, directed by Hype Williams, takes several cues from Lethal Weapon with Busta made to look like Mel Gibson (Riggs) and Spliff Star to look like Gary Busey (Mr. Joshua). The second verse also references the scene where Riggs is electrocuted, and ends with a confrontation between Busta and himself, this time dressed as Sho'nuff from The Last Dragon.

== Formats and track listings ==
These are the formats and track listings of major single releases of "Dangerous".

- CD single
1. "Dangerous" (album version)
2. "Dangerous" (instrumental)
3. "Dangerous" (a cappella)
4. "You Won't Tell, I Won't Tell" (unavailable on album)
5. "Coming Off" (unavailable on album)
6. "You Won't Tell, I Won't Tell" (instrumental)
7. "Coming Off" (instrumental)
- UK CD single
1. "Dangerous" (album version)
2. "Dangerous" (Soul Society remix)
3. "Dangerous" (album dirty version)
4. "Dangerous" (Natural Born Chillers remix)

== Credits and personnel ==
- Vocals: Busta Rhymes, Rachelle Weston
- Audio mixing: Dominick Barbera, Busta Rhymes, DJ Scratch, Vinny Nicoletti
- Mixing assistant: Rich Tapper, Floyd Nixon
- Engineer: Vinny Nicoletti
- Assistant engineers: Tom Passetti, Dave Raythatha

== Charts and certifications ==
=== Weekly charts ===
Chart (1997–1998)	Peak position
Australia (ARIA)	92
Germany (GfK)	65
Netherlands (Single Top 100)	84
New Zealand (Recorded Music NZ)	33
Scotland Singles (OCC)	71
UK Singles (OCC)	32
UK Dance (OCC)	6
UK Hip Hop/R&B (OCC)	5
US Billboard Hot 100	9
US Dance Singles Sales (Billboard)	1
US Hot R&B/Hip-Hop Songs (Billboard)	4
US Hot Rap Songs (Billboard)	1
US Rhythmic Airplay (Billboard)	31

=== Year-end charts ===
Chart (1997)	Position
UK Urban (Music Week)	35

Chart (1998)	Position
US Billboard Hot 100	80
US Hot R&B/Hip-Hop Songs (Billboard)	40

=== Certifications ===
Region	Certification	Certified units/sales
United States (RIAA)	Gold	600,000
