= DJ Skribble =

American DJ and remixer

- Born: Scott Ialacci; October 10, 1968 (age 58); Elmont, New York, U.S.
- Genre: Hip-hop
- Occupations: Record producer; disc jockey; mixing engineer
- Years active: 1989–present
- Labels: MCA; Warlock
- Formerly of: Young Black Teenagers

Scott Ialacci, professionally known as DJ Skribble (born October 10, 1968) is an American DJ, producer, remixer, and radio personality.

In the early 1990s, he teamed up with Kamron, ATA, Firstborn and Tommy Never in Young Black Teenagers, who released two albums before splitting up.

In 1996, he worked with Bill Irwin on the musical Hip Hop Wonderland. He also worked on Wyclef Jean's first album, as well as with another Fugee, Lauryn Hill.

Skribble released several mix albums, including two volumes of Traffic Jams, two volumes of MDMA, Essential Dance 2000 (on Atlantic Records), Essential Spring Break and Skribble's House (both on London-Sire Records) and Perfecto Presents: DJ Skribble (on ThriveDance/Perfecto Records).

Skribble also worked on MTV's The Grind, Total Request Live, Spring Break, Hip Hop Night and the Millennium Special Live. He has appeared several times on various radio and television shows, and appeared in the 2000 film Turn It Up, credited as 'DJ'. Skribble was also a judge for the 8th annual Independent Music Awards to support independent artists. Skribble was also a host for a short time in 2000 along with co-hosts Rebecca Budig, Michael Cole and Tazz for one of the WWF's wrestling television programs, WWF Sunday Night Heat when it premiered on MTV in October of that year in WWF New York.

In 2001 he appeared in the music video for I'm a Slave 4 U by Britney Spears.

Skribble appeared on New York City radio stations such as Hot 97 for two years and worked for WKTU for over eleven years. He is currently a resident DJ at the MGM Grand Hotel and Casino in Las Vegas.

== Discography ==
=== Albums ===
- Traffic Jams (1997)
- MDMA, Vol. 1 (1998)
- MDMA, Vol. 2 (1999)
- Traffic Jams 2000 (1999)
- Essential Dance 2000 (2000)
- Essential Spring Break - Summer 2001 (2001)
- Essential Presents: Skribble's House (2001)
- MDMA: Reloaded (2004)
- Perfecto Presents: DJ Skribble (2005)

=== Mixed compilations ===
- Best of Dance Mix USA, Vol. 1 (1997)
- Best of Dance Mix USA, Vol. 2 (1998)
- The Real Hip-Hop: Best of D&D Studios, Vol. 1 (1999)
- Reddlite Continuous Mix (2000)
- Ministry of Sound: American Anthems (2003)
- ThriveMix 03 (2007)
- ThriveMix 04 (2007)
- ThriveMix Presents: Total Dance 2008 (2007)
- Total Club Hits (2008)
- ThriveMix 5 (2008)
- Total Club Hits 2 (2009)
- Total Club Hits 3 (2009)
- ThriveMix Presents: Dance Nation: The Ultimate Party Mix! (2010)
- The New Dance Mix USA, Vol. 3: In the Club (2013)

=== Singles/EPs ===
- "Everybody Come On" (1999)
- "Latino Pride"

=== Selected remixes ===
- "My Man" - Alexis
- "Slow Down 2000 (No Doubt)" - Boot Camp Clik
- "Must be the Music" - Big Punisher & Cuban Link
- "Born in the U.S.A." - Bruce Springsteen
- "No Competition" - Common
- "Treat Me Right" - Craig Mack
- "Your Heart" - Cyberslam
- "All Night Long" - Danny P & Fatman Scoop
- "I Love This Way" - Eden's Crush
- "Ride Away" - Flipmode Squad
- "Play That Beat Mr. DJ" - Gang Starr
- "It's Not Over" - Grace
- "East Coast Boy and West Coast Girl" - Grand Puba
- "Higher & Higher" - GTS
- "I Need Your Love" - Jana
- "I'll House You 1998" - Jungle Brothers
- "I'll Do Anything" - K-7
- "Keep It Tight" - Lauryn Hill
- "Never Leave You (Uh Oooh, Uh Oooh)" - Lumidee
- "She's Like the Wind" - Lumidee & Tony Sunshine
- "Love Is All We Need (Remix)" - Mary J. Blige
- "This Is For My People" - Missy Elliott
- "I'm Not In Love" - Olive
- "Most Girls" - Pink
- "You Can't Stop the Pras" - Prakazrel
- "The Dream" - Run D.M.C.
- "Gotta Tell You" - Samantha Mumba
- "Feel It" - Three 6 Mafia, Flo Rida, Sean Kingston & Tiësto
- "Whatever You Like" - T.I. & Dave Navarro
- "DisneyRemixMania Megamix" - Various Artists
- "Innovation" - Vinyl Life
- "Dare" - Willa Ford
- "Fresh Interlude" - Wyclef Jean
- "The Streets Are Like A Jungle" - Wyclef Jean
- "We No Speak Americano" - Yolanda Be Cool & DCUP
