= The Ummah =

American band

- Left to right: Q-Tip, Jay Dee, Ali Shaheed Muhammad

Background information
- Origin: New York City, U.S. Detroit, Michigan, U.S.
- Genres: Hip hop
- Years active: 1996–2000
- Label: Freelance
- Members: Q-Tip; Jay Dee (deceased); Ali Shaheed Muhammad

The Ummah was a music production collective, composed of members Q-Tip and Ali Shaheed Muhammad of A Tribe Called Quest, and the late Jay Dee (also known as J Dilla) of the Detroit-based group Slum Village. Occasional members included Raphael Saadiq, and D'Angelo. In addition to producing nearly the entirety of A Tribe Called Quest's fourth and fifth albums, the Ummah provided backing tracks and remixes for a notable array of hip hop and contemporary R&B artists, including Busta Rhymes, Whitney Houston, Keith Murray, the Brand New Heavies, Michael Jackson, Janet Jackson, and Jon B. The group was so named because two of its members (Tip and Ali) are devout Muslims. The word "ummah" is Arabic for "community", "nation", or "brotherhood". Generally, the term refers to the global Muslim population.

== Biography ==
=== Background ===
The collective took shape around 1995; veteran keyboardist Amp Fiddler introduced Jay Dee (who at the time was shopping for a deal for his group) to Q-Tip during the 1994 Lollapalooza. Tip was impressed enough by Jay Dee's soulful productions to invite him as an addition to Tribe's music-production team, which until then consisted of Tip and occasionally Ali Shaheed.

=== Production work ===
According to Q-Tip, productions credited to the Ummah were made individually by its members. Thus, the contributing member was given a songwriting credit for their work.

Its first work, Beats, Rhymes and Life, was criticized for moving away from the group's earlier, denser, and bottom heavy sound exemplified by tracks such as "Scenario" and "Oh My God." The new sound, which now leaned towards a more laid-back and polished tone, would be embraced a little more with the release of Tribe's "Find a Way" from its fifth album, The Love Movement, although the album itself received a lukewarm reception, and no second proper single or video was released.

Following this and the split of A Tribe Called Quest, Q-Tip and Jay Dee continued to collaborate under the Ummah moniker, producing all of Tip's solo album Amplified, with the exception of two tracks from DJ Scratch. For several reasons, including label complications, Tip's solo career became largely inactive while Jay Dee and D'Angelo went on to form the Soulquarians with other like-minded artists. Although A Tribe Called Quest briefly reunited to release "ICU (Doin' It)" in 2003, the Ummah did not collaborate again after that, and Jay Dee's death on February 10, 2006 from complications of Lupus ended the project definitively.

Despite the well-known projects and collaborations the collective did, people would erroneously assume that The Ummah was another name, or perhaps even an alter-ego of Q-Tip. As a result, many contributions by J Dilla would go overlooked and unnoticed. Looking back at the collective's formation and history, in an interview, Q-Tip stated:

That word (Ummah) means brotherhood. But the problem with The Ummah and even now with me with Tribe ... With Ummah, just because I was the face, people would automatically assume sometimes, like with that "Sometimes" remix, that I produced it or that I did the beat when it was Dilla. So people would get confused sometimes over that and think that just because I'm the face of it, if it says The Ummah it means that I did it or credited it as such. And that wasn't the case. So he (Dilla) wanted to make sure that he got known for what he did ... It's the same thing for Tribe right now, a lot of people still think that Ali did those first 3 albums because he was the DJ ... So I can empathize with where Dilla was at because I was at the same place you know?!? My whole idea I think it was a great idea to represent a unit. But from poor management to not really understanding the ramifications of it, it didn't work to that (great idea) necessarily. Still in all I think we all were able to make some good music ... I saw some people say that I didn't do the "Get Down" remix, the Craig Mack shit. People were saying Dilla did that but I did that. Then people were saying that I did "Breathe & Stop" but Dilla did that. And they were saying Dilla did "Vivrant Thing" but I did that. You know it's just all mixed up.

== Discography ==
=== Albums ===
- A Tribe Called Quest, Beats, Rhymes and Life (Jive, 1996) – RIAA certification: Platinum
- A Tribe Called Quest, The Love Movement (Jive, 1998) – RIAA certification: Gold
- Q-Tip, Amplified (Arista, 1999) – RIAA certification: Gold

=== Selected production ===
==== 1996 ====
- Busta Rhymes - "Ill Vibe", "Still Shining", "Keep It Movin'"
  - The Coming
- Busta Rhymes - "It's a Party (The Ummah Remix)"; "Ill Vibe (The Ummah Remix)"
  - 12"/CD single
- Grant Green - "Down Here on the Ground (The Ummah Remix)"
  - The New Groove: The Blue Note Remix Project
- The Roots - "Ital (The Universal Side)"
  - Illadelph Halflife
- A Tribe Called Quest & Common - "The Remedy"
  - Get on the Bus (soundtrack)
- - "Peace, Prosperity & Paper"
  - High School High (soundtrack)
- Da Bush Babees - "Gravity", "3 MCs"
  - Gravity
- Keith Murray - "Dangerous Ground"; "The Rhyme (Remix)"
  - Enigma
- Phife Dawg & Rodney Hampton - "Game Day"; AZ, Zhane, Ray Buchanan & Scott Galbraith - "When the Cheering Stops"
  - NFL Jam

==== 1997 ====
- A Tribe Called Quest - "Same Ol' Thing"
  - Men in Black: The Album
- - "Mardi Gras at Midnight"
  - The Jam [EP]
- Janet Jackson - "Got 'Til It's Gone (Ummah's Uptown Saturday Night Mix/Jay Dee's Revenge Mix)"
  - 12"/CD single
- Jon B. - "Cool Relax"
  - Cool Relax
- Mariah Carey - Honey
  - Butterfly
- Michael Jackson - "HIStory" (The Ummah Radio Mix/Urban Mix/DJ Mix)
  - 12"/CD single
- Mint Condition - "Let Me Be the One (Ummah Remix featuring Phife/featuring Q-Tip)"
  - 12"/CD single
- Somethin' for the People - "All I Do (Jay Dee's Shhh Remix)"
  - 12"/CD single
- Busta Rhymes - "So Hardcore"
  - When Disaster Strikes...
- Brand New Heavies - "Sometimes (The Ummah Remix)"
  - 12"/CD single
- Crustation - "Purple (ATCQ Edit)"
  - 12"/CD single
- A Tribe Called Quest & Busta Rhymes - "Wild Hot"
  - Rhyme & Reason (soundtrack)

==== 1998 ====
- Jamiroquai - "Deeper Underground (The Ummah Mix)"
  - 12"/CD single
- Funkmaster Flex - "That Shit" (ATCQ & Jay Dee)
  - The Mix Tape, Vol. III
- Q-Tip - "Hey"
  - Slam (soundtrack)

==== 1999 ====
- Heavy D - "I Don't Think So"; "Listen"
  - Heavy

==== 2003 ====
- A Tribe Called Quest - Hits, Rarities & Remixes
  - 17. "The Night He Got Caught"
