= Rashad Smith (producer) =

American hip hop and R&B record producer (born 1972)

- Genres: Hip hop; R&B; pop; world; rock
- Occupations: Record producer; songwriter; disc jockey
- Years active: 1994–present
- Label: Tumblin' Dice Entertainment
- Member of: The Hitmen; Flipmode Squad

Rashad Smith is an American hip hop and R&B record producer.

At the age of 19, he provided beats to Main Source, Eric B. & Rakim and A Tribe Called Quest. He proceeded further into the music business by working directly with Andre Harrell at the newly minted Uptown Records.

He is the cousin of producer and Main Source member K-Cut.

== Production credits ==
- 1993: Mary J. Blige -- "What's the 411 (Remix)?"
- 1994: Billy Lawrence -- "My Heart My Angel" {drum programming}; "Happiness (Tumblin' Dice Remix)"
- 1994: Miss Jones -- ""Don't Front" (8th Street Mob Mix)
- 1994: A Tribe Called Quest -- "Lyrics to Go (Tumblin' Dice Remix)"
- 1994: 7669 -- "Joy (Bad Boy Club Mix)"
- 1994: The Notorious B.I.G. -- "Just Playin' (Dreams)"
- 1994: Craig Mack -- "Makin' Moves with Puff"
- 1994: Mary J. Blige -- "Be Happy (Bad Boy Butter Mix)"
- 1995: The Notorious B.I.G. -- "One More Chance/Stay With Me"
- 1995: LL Cool J – "Doin' It"; "Loungin"; "God Bless"
- 1996: Total -- "Do You Know"; "Someone Like You" (produced with Chucky Thompson)
- 1996: Aaliyah -- "Choosey Lover (Old/New School)"
- 1996: Busta Rhymes -- "Woo-Hah!! Got You All in Check" (produced with Busta Rhymes)
- 1996: 702 -- "Get Down Like That"
- 1996: LL Cool J -- "Doin It Again" from The Nutty Professor (soundtrack)
- 1996: LL Cool J -- "Ain't Nobody" from Beavis & Butthead (soundtrack)
- 1996: Ladae! -- "Party 2Nite (On Line Street Flava)"
- 1996: Keith Sweat -- "Twisted (Tumblin Dice Street Mix-Original Rap)"
- 1996: Nas -- "If I Ruled the World (Imagine That)" (produced with Trackmasters)
- 1996: MC Lyte -- "Cold Rock a Party"; "One on One"; "Druglord Superstar"
- 1996: A Tribe Called Quest -- "The Hop"
- 1996: Salt-N-Pepa -- "Upside Down (Round n Round)" from Space Jam: Music from and Inspired by the Motion Picture
- 1997: En Vogue -- "Whatever (Tumblin' Dice Remix)"
- 1997: Rampage -- "The Night B4 My Shit Drop"; "The Set Up"; "Niggaz Iz Bad"; "Take It to the Streets"
- 1997: Junior M.A.F.I.A. -- "Young Casanovas" (produced with Armando Colon) from How to Be a Player (soundtrack)
- 1997: DJ Skribble -- "Everybody, Come On"; "Must Be the Music" (produced with Armando Colon & Skribble)
- 1997: 98 Degrees - "I Wanna Love You"
- 1997: Shades - "What Would You Do" (produced with Armando Colon)
- 1997: Puff Daddy -- "Do You Know?"; "Young G's"
- 1997: LSG -- "Curious" (produced with Armando Colon & Keith Sweat)
- 1997: Lil' Kim -- "Ladies' Night (Not Tonight Remix)" from Nothing to Lose (soundtrack)
- 1997: Busta Rhymes -- "Rhymes Galore"; "Dangerous"; "You Won't Tell, I Won't Tell"
- 1997: Billy Lawrence -- "Footsteps"
- 1998: Masayo Queen -- "Take Me to Higher (Tumblin' Dice Remix)"
- 1998: SWV -- "I Wanna Be Where You Are" from Hav Plenty (soundtrack)
- 1998: Das EFX -- "Set It Off"; "Rap Scholar"
- 1998: Myron -- "Destiny (Remix)"
- 1998: Miss Jones -- "Won't Stop"
- 1998: Fat Joe -- "Good Times"
- 1998: Busta Rhymes -- "Keeping It Tight"
- 1999: Solé -- "Accurate Math"
- 1999: Slick Rick -- "Trapped in Me"
- 2000: Carl Thomas -- "SupaStar" (produced with Brian Kierulf, Joshua Michael Schwartz)
- 2000: 50 Cent -- "Thug Love"
- 2001: DJ Clue? featuring Mobb Deep -- "The Best of Queens (It's Us)"
- 2001: Big Pun -- "How We Roll (98)"
- 2003: Big Gipp -- "History Mystery"
- 2008: Erykah Badu -- "Real Thang (Remix By Rashad 'Ringo' Smith/Tumblin Dice)"
- 2009: Ghostface Killah – "Baby" (Produced by Austin "Watts" Garrick & Rashad Smith)
