= Monie Love discography =

Monie Love is a British rapper and actress who has released two studio albums, one mixtape, one album as part of a group, one EP, and 14 singles.

== Albums ==
=== Studio albums ===
List of studio albums, with selected chart positions
Title	Album details	Peak chart positions						
Title	Album details	UK	AUS	AUT	SWI	US	US R&B /HH	US Heat.
Down to Earth	Released: October 1990; Label: Warner Bros. (US) Chrysalis/EMI Records (EU); Formats: CD, LP, Cassette, digital download, streaming	30	114	29	32	109	26	—
In a Word or 2	Released: March 1993; Label: Warner Bros. (US) Chrysalis/EMI (EU); Formats: CD, LP, Cassette, digital download, streaming	—	147	—	—	—	75	39
"—" denotes a recording that did not chart or was not released in that territory.

=== Mixtapes ===
List of mixtapes
Title	Album details
Monie Love Presents Sisterhood of the Traveling Mic	Released: June 2010; Label: Coast 2 Coast Mixtapes; Formats: digital download

== EPs ==
List of extended plays
Title	EP details
Heresy (as part of Heresy)	Released: 14 August 2015; Label: Polar Entertainment; Formats: CD, digital download, streaming

=== Promotional EPs ===
List of promotional extended plays
Title	EP details
New Material	Released: 1998; Label: Tommy Boy; Formats: CD
Monie Love	Released: 2000; Label: Love Productions; Formats: LP

== Singles ==
=== As lead artist ===
List of singles, with selected chart positions, showing year released and album name
Title	Year	Peak chart positions										Album
Title	Year	UK	AUS	GER	NED	NZ	SWI	US	US Dance	US R&B	US Rap	Album
"I Can Do This"	1988	37	—	—	18	—	—	—	—	—	—	Down to Earth
"Grandpa's Party"	1989	16	93	—	51	33	—	—	—	—	—	Down to Earth
"Monie in the Middle"	1990	46	—	—	—	—	—	—	7	28	1	Down to Earth
"It's a Shame (My Sister)" (featuring True Image)	1990	12	90	11	9	17	6	26	2	8	1	Down to Earth
"Down to Earth"	1990	31	152	33	29	—	15	—	—	75	30	Down to Earth
"Ring My Bell" (with Adeva)	1991	20	35	25	15	13	8	—	—	—	—	Love or Lust and Down to Earth
"Work It Out"	1991	—	—	—	—	—	—	—	—	—	—	Boyz n the Hood Soundtrack
"Full Term Love"	1992	34	150	—	58	—	—	96	—	47	7	Class Act Soundtrack and In a Word or 2
"Born 2 B.R.E.E.D."	1993	18	98	—	5	21	35	89	1	56	7	In a Word or 2
"In a Word or 2"	1993	33	201	—	—	—	—	—	—	—	—	In a Word or 2
"Never Give Up"	1993	41	193	—	—	—	—	—	—	—	—	In a Word or 2
"Slice of da Pie"	1997	29	—	—	—	—	—	—	—	—	—	Non-album singles
"Divine" (featuring Skyzoo & Tuff)	2021	—	—	—	—	—	—	—	—	—	—	Non-album singles
"1NE People" (featuring Nana Fofie)	2022	—	—	—	—	—	—	—	—	—	—	Non-album singles
"—" denotes releases that did not chart or were not released.

=== As featured artist ===
List of singles as featured artist with selected chart positions, showing year released and album name
Title	Year	Peak chart positions							Album
Title	Year	UK	FRA	ITA	NED	US Dance	US R&B	US Rap	Album
"Free Style" (as member of Jus Badd)	1988	—	—	—	—	—	—	—	Non-album single
"Buddy" (De La Soul featuring Q-Tip, Queen Latifah, Monie Love & Jungle Brothers)	1989	7	—	—	—	27	18	2	3 Feet High and Rising
"She Drives Me Crazy (The Monie Love Mix)" (Fine Young Cannibals featuring Monie Love)	1989	—	—	—	—	—	—	—	The Raw & the Remix
"Ladies First" (Queen Latifah featuring Monie Love)	1989	—	—	—	—	38	64	5	All Hail the Queen
"Doin' Our Own Dang" (Jungle Brothers featuring A Tribe Called Quest, Queen Latifah, Monie Love & De La Soul)	1990	33	—	—	40	—	—	—	Done by the Forces of Nature
"Saturday" (Cunnie Williams featuring Monie Love)	1998	—	35	24	—	—	—	—	Star Hotel
"Where Are They Now (Remix)" (Nas featuring Chip Fu, The Original Spinderella, Das EFX, Dres, EST, Father MC, Lords of the Underground, Mike Gee, Monie Love, Positive K, Redhead Kingpin & Rob Base)	2007	—	—	—	—	—	—	—	Non-album single
"Hip Hop (Remix)" (as member of Heresy)	2015	—	—	—	—	—	—	—	Heresy
"—" denotes releases that did not chart or were not released.

==== As featured artist ====
- "Ladies First" (Queen Latifah featuring Monie Love)
- "My Name Is Not Susan" (Whitney Houston featuring Monie Love) – My Name Is Not Susan (Power Radio Mix With Rap)
