= Jungle Brothers discography =

Catalog of published recordings by the band Jungle Brothers

This article presents the discography of Jungle Brothers, an American hip hop trio composed of Michael Small (Mike Gee) and Nathaniel Hall (Afrika Baby Bam).

== Studio albums ==
List of studio albums, with selected chart positions
Title	Album details	Peak chart positions							
Title	Album details	US R&B /HH	US Heat.	AUS	NED	NZ	UK	UK R&B	UK Ind.
Straight out the Jungle	Released: July, 1988; Label: Warlock; Format: CD, LP, cassette, digital download, streaming	39	—	—	—	—	—	—	—
Done by the Forces of Nature	Released: November 7, 1989; Label: Warner Bros.; Format: CD, LP, cassette, digital download, streaming	46	—	102	84	50	41	—	—
J Beez wit the Remedy	Released: June 22, 1993; Label: Warner Bros.; Format: CD, LP, cassette	52	—	9	—	—	—	—	—
Raw Deluxe	Released: June 3, 1997; Label: Gee Street/V2; Format: CD, LP, cassette	37	12	—	—	—	94	16	19
V.I.P.	Released: January 4, 2000; Label: Gee Street/V2; Format: CD, LP, cassette, digital download	—	50	151	—	—	—	—	22
All That We Do	Released: October 29, 2002; Label: Jungle Brother (US) V2 (JPN); Format: CD, LP, digital download, streaming	—	—	—	—	—	—	—	—
I Got U	Released: March 13, 2006; Label: Rambling; Format: 2x LPs, CD	—	—	—	—	—	—	—	—
Keep It Jungle	Released: April 17, 2020; Label: J Beez/Slamboyant; Format: CD, digital download, streaming	—	—	—	—	—	—	—	—
"—" denotes a recording that did not chart.

=== Mixtapes albums ===
List of mixtapes albums
Title	Album details
Crazy Wisdom Masters	Released: January 14, 2021; Label: self-released; Formats: digital download

=== Compilation albums ===
List of compilation albums
Title	Album details
Beyond This World: Best & Rare	Released: July 11, 2000; Label: Warner Bros.; Formats: CD
This Is... Jungle Brothers	Released: September 13, 2005; Label: Nurture/V2; Formats: 2x CD

=== Remix albums ===
List of remix albums
Title	Album details
Jungllenium Remixes	Released: March 28, 2000; Label: V2; Formats: CD

=== Promotional albums ===
List of compilation albums
Title	Album details
Jungle Brothers Classics (compilation)	Released: 1996; Label: Gee Street; Formats: LP

== EPs ==
List of extended plays
Title	Details
Jungle Brother: The Remixes (remix EP)	Released: 1997; Label: V2; Formats: CD
The Payback EP (Note: "The Payback EP" was released under the alter ego Crazy Wisdom Masters.)	Released: 1999; Label: Black Hoodz; Formats: LP
EP 1 (compilation EP)	Released: March 1, 2005; Label: Simply Vinyl/V2; Formats: LP
EP 2 (compilation EP)	Released: March 1, 2005; Label: Simply Vinyl/V2; Formats: LP
3-Pack (compilation EP)	Released: May 16, 2006; Label: Warlock; Formats: digital download

=== Promotional EPs ===
List of extended plays
Title	Details
Very Important Party (mixtape EP)	Released: 2000; Label: V2; Formats: cassette

== Box sets ==
List of compilation boxs
Title	Details
Raw Deluxe + Off the Hook	Released: 1997; Label: Gee Street; Formats: 2x CDs
Straight out the Jungle + Instrumental Show Tape	Released: 2015; Label: Idlers; Formats: 2x cassettes

== Singles ==
=== As lead artist ===
List of singles with selected chart positions, showing year released and album name
Title	Year	Peak chart positions										Album
Title	Year	US Dance	US R&B	US Rap	AUS	BEL	GER	NED	NZ	SWE	UK	Album
"Jimbrowski" (featuring Kool DJ Red Alert)	1987	—	—	*	—	—	—	—	—	—	—	Straight Out the Jungle
"Because I Got It Like That"	1988	—	—	*	—	—	—	—	—	—	—	Straight Out the Jungle
"On the Run"	1988	—	—	*	—	—	—	—	—	—	—	Straight Out the Jungle
"I'll House You"	1988	— (Note: "I'll House You" did not enter the Dance Club Songs, but peaked at number 46 on the Dance/Electronic Singles Sales.)	—	16	—	—	—	—	—	—	22	Straight Out the Jungle
"Black Is Black"/"Straight out the Jungle" (featuring Q-Tip)	1989	—	—	—	—	—	—	—	—	—	72	Straight Out the Jungle
"Beyond This World"	1989	—	—	—	—	—	—	—	42	—	—	Done by the Forces of Nature
"What 'U' Waitin' '4'?"	1990	13	—	19	146	14	—	10	—	—	35	Done by the Forces of Nature
"Because I Got It Like That (Ultimatum Mix)"	1990	—	—	—	—	—	—	—	—	—	98	Non-album single
"Doin' Our Own Dang" (featuring A Tribe Called Quest, Queen Latifah, Monie Love & De La Soul)	1990	—	—	—	—	—	—	40	—	—	33	Done by the Forces of Nature
"40 Below Trooper"	1993	—	—	2	—	—	—	—	—	—	—	J. Beez wit the Remedy
"On the Road Again (My Jimmy Weighs a Ton)" (featuring Q-Tip)	1993	—	—	—	—	—	—	—	—	—	—	J. Beez wit the Remedy
"Who Could It Be" (as Luciano meets Jungle Brothers)	1995	—	—	—	—	—	—	—	—	—	99	The Rebirth Of Cool Six
"How Ya Want It (We Go It)" (featuring De La Soul)	1996	—	—	—	—	—	—	—	—	—	—	Raw Deluxe
"Brain"	1997	—	76	23	—	—	—	—	—	—	52	Raw Deluxe
"Jungle Brother"	1997	—	—	—	—	—	—	—	—	—	56	Raw Deluxe
"Jungle Brother (Urban Takeover Mix)"	1997	—	—	—	—	—	—	—	—	—	18	Senseless Soundtrack and Jungllenium Remixes
"I'll House You '98"	1998	— (Note: "I'll House You '98" did not enter the Dance Club Songs, but peaked at number 28 on the Dance/Electronic Singles Sales.)	—	—	147	—	—	84	—	—	26	Non-album single
"Because I Got It Like That '98"	1998	—	—	—	109	—	—	68	—	—	32	V.I.P.
"V.I.P."	1999	—	—	—	62	—	—	—	—	40	28	Whatever It Takes Soundtrack, FIFA 2000 Soundtrack and V.I.P.
"Get Down"	1999	—	—	—	169	—	—	—	—	—	52	V.I.P.
"Freakin' You"	2000	—	—	—	272	—	—	—	—	—	70	Bring It On Soundtrack and V.I.P.
"Breathe (Don't Stop)" (as Mr. On vs. Jungle Brothers)	2004	—	—	—	33	30	56	—	—	—	21	Big Brother VIP 3 Soundtrack
"Beats on a String" (as Ali B vs. Jungle Brothers)	2005	—	—	—	—	—	—	—	—	—	—	I Got U
"Funky Magic" (as Skeewiff vs. Jungle Brothers)	2006	—	—	—	—	—	—	—	—	—	—	I Got U
"We Love You JB's"	2006	—	—	—	—	—	—	—	—	—	—	I Got U
"Gimme That" (with Ali B)	2016	—	—	—	—	—	—	—	—	—	—	Non-album singles
"Yeah!"	2019	—	—	—	—	—	—	—	—	—	—	Keep It Jungle
"Black Is Black"/"Straight out the Jungle" (re-release) (featuring Q-Tip)	2021	—	—	—	—	—	—	—	—	—	— (Note: "Black Is Black"/"Straight out the Jungle" did not enter the UK Singles Chart, but peaked at number 59 on the UK Physical Singles Chart.)	Straight Out the Jungle
"Fire" (featuring Bam)	2021	—	—	—	—	—	—	—	—	—	—	Non-album single
"Jimbrowski" (re-release) (featuring Kool DJ Red Alert)	2022	—	—	—	—	—	—	—	—	—	— (Note: "Jimbrowski" did not enter the UK Singles Chart, but peaked at number 47 on the UK Physical Singles Chart.)	Straight Out the Jungle
"Afrokinetic" (with Nickodemus and Mamadou Tangoudia)	2025	—	—	—	—	—	—	—	—	—	—	Non-album single
"—" denotes releases that did not chart or were not released. "*" indicates a chart that did not exist at the time.
