= Beats, Rhymes & Life: The Travels of A Tribe Called Quest =

2011 film by Michael Rapaport

- Theatrical release poster
- Directed by: Michael Rapaport
- Produced by: A Tribe Called Quest; Robert Benavides; Debra Koffler; Eric Matthies; Frank Mele; Edward Parks
- Starring: A Tribe Called Quest
- Cinematography: Robert Benavides
- Edited by: Lenny Mesina
- Music by: Madlib
- Production companies: Rival Pictures; Om Films
- Distributed by: Sony Pictures Classics
- Release date: July 8, 2011
- Running time: 97 minutes
- Country: United States
- Language: English
- Box office: $1.2 million

Beats, Rhymes & Life: The Travels of A Tribe Called Quest is a 2011 documentary film about the music group A Tribe Called Quest, directed by Michael Rapaport. The film was released on July 8, 2011, by Sony Pictures Classics.

== Music ==
Madlib composed the film score, with music supervision by Peanut Butter Wolf and Gary Harris. The other songs featured (in order) are as follows, with all songs performed by A Tribe Called Quest unless stated otherwise:

- "8 Million Stories"
- "We Can Get Down"
- "Can I Kick It?"
- "Third Rock" – performed by Pure Essence
- "Check the Rhime"
- "Death Rap" – performed by Margo's Kool Out Crew
- "Sucker MC's (Krush-Groove 1)" – performed by Run-DMC
- "Mr. Muhammad"
- "Ah Get Up" – performed by James Pants
- "P.S.K. What Does It Mean?" – performed by Schoolly D
- "Strong Island" – performed by JVC-Force
- "Fresh Is the Word" – performed by Mantronix
- "Push It Along"
- "Footprints"
- "Butter"
- "Electric Relaxation"
- "Excursions"
- "Award Tour"
- "Find a Way"
- "He's My DJ (Red Alert)" – performed by Sparky D
- "Youthful Expression"
- "On the Run" – performed by Jungle Brothers
- "Black Is Black" – performed by Jungle Brothers feat. Q-Tip
- "The Promo" – performed by Jungle Brothers feat. Q-Tip
- "Distant Land (Hip Hop Drum Mix)" – performed by Donald Byrd
- "Spinning Wheel" – performed by Lonnie Smith
- "Ham n' Eggs"
- "I Left My Wallet In El Segundo"
- "Bonita Applebum"
- "Ain't Hip to Be Labeled a Hippie" – performed by De La Soul
- "African Cry" – performed by The New Birth
- "Nomusa" – performed by Ndikho Xaba & The Natives
- "Buddy" – performed by De La Soul feat. Q-Tip
- "Jazz (We've Got)"
- "Buggin' Out"
- "Oh My God (Remix)"
- "Lyrics to Go"
- "Inside My Love" – performed by Minnie Ripperton
- "Clap Your Hands"
- "God Lives Through"
- "On Love" – performed by David T Walker
- "Crew"
- "Daylight" – performed by Yesterday's New Quintet
- "Donna" – performed by Phil Hewitt Jazz Ensemble
- "Baby Phife's Return"
- "Margaret Song" – performed by Money Mark
- "Life Is Better" – performed by Q-Tip feat. Norah Jones
- "Stressed Out"
- "The Chase Part 2"
- "Midnight"
- "Get a Hold"

== Reception ==
=== Critical response ===
Beats, Rhymes & Life: The Travels of A Tribe Called Quest has received largely positive reviews from critics with a current 90% "fresh" rating on Rotten Tomatoes based on 62 reviews, with the critics' consensus saying, "This documentary focuses less on the music and more on the personality clashes and in-group tensions to great, compelling effect."

=== Accolades ===
Award	Date of ceremony	Category	Result
Black Reel Awards	February 9, 2012	Outstanding Documentary	Won
Grammy Awards	February 12, 2012	Best Long Form Music Video	Nominated
Producers Guild of America Awards	January 21, 2012	Best Documentary Motion Picture	Won
