= Ring My Bell (Monie Love vs. Adeva song) =

Single by Monie Love vs. Adeva

from the album Love or Lust
- Released: 1991
- Genre: EDM; hip house
- Label: Chrysalis; Cooltempo
- Songwriters: Richie Fermie; Monie Love
- Producer: Richie Fermie

Adeva singles chronology
"Treat Me Right" (1990)	"Ring My Bell" (1991)	"It Should Have Been Me" (1991)

Monie Love singles chronology
"It's a Shame (My Sister)" (1990)	"Ring My Bell" (1991)	"Born 2 B.R.E.E.D." (1993)

Music video
- "Ring My Bell" on YouTube

"Ring My Bell" is a song recorded by British rapper, actress, and radio personality Monie Love and American singer Adeva. Released in March 1991 by Chrysalis and Cooltempo Records as a single, it became a top-10 hit in Finland and Switzerland, and a top-20 hit in Luxembourg, the Netherlands, New Zealand and the UK. Love co-wrote the lyrics with the song's producer Richie Fermie. It was included on Adeva's second album, Love or Lust (1991). The accompanying music video features the singers battling each other in a boxing ring.

== Critical reception ==
Andrew Mueller from Melody Maker wrote, "Subtitled "A Contest Over Twelve Inches", this ostensible clash of the titans pits Monie Love's affected staccato rap against Adeva's oddly tuneless warble and produces a contest roughly as entertaining as any other rock-type collaboration you can think of. That is to say, not very."

== Track listing ==
- 7", UK (1991)
1. "Ring My Bell"
2. "Ring My Bell" (Upper Cut Mix)
- 12", Europe (1991)
1. "Ring My Bell" (Touchdown Mix) — 5:47
2. "Ring My Bell" (Upper Cut Mix) — 4:32
3. "Ring My Bell" (L-Plate Mix) — 8:08
- CD single, Europe (1991)
1. "Ring My Bell"
2. "Ring My Bell" (Touchdown Mix)
3. "Ring My Bell" (Upper Cut Mix)
- CD maxi, Europe (1991)
1. "Ring My Bell" 3:35
2. "Ring My Bell" (Touchdown Mix) — 5:49
3. "Ring My Bell" (Upper Cut Mix) — 4:32

== Charts ==
=== Weekly charts ===
Chart (1991)	Peak position
Australia (ARIA)	35
Belgium (Ultratop 50 Flanders)	44
Europe (Eurochart Hot 100)	36
Finland (Suomen virallinen lista)	7
Germany (Official German Charts)	25
Israel (Israeli Singles Chart)	29
Luxembourg (Radio Luxembourg)	16
Netherlands (Dutch Top 40)	13
Netherlands (Single Top 100)	15
New Zealand (Recorded Music NZ)	13
Switzerland (Schweizer Hitparade)	8
UK Singles (OCC)	20
UK Airplay (Music Week)	32
UK Dance (Music Week)	7
UK Club Chart (Record Mirror)	2

=== Year-end charts ===
Chart (1991)	Position
UK Club Chart (Record Mirror)	7
