= The Bitch Is Back (disambiguation) =

"The Bitch Is Back" is a hard rock song by Elton John, written with Bernie Taupin, from his 1974 album Caribou.

The Bitch Is Back may also refer to:

== Albums ==
- The Bitch Is Back (Bitch album), 1987
- The Bitch Is Back (Roxanne Shanté album), 1992
- The Bitch Is Back ... Live, a 2013 album by Lita Ford

== Television ==
- "The Bitch Is Back" (Veronica Mars), the series finale of the American television series Veronica Mars
- "The Bitch is Back", a 1994 episode of Melrose Place

== See also ==
- The Bitch Is Black, a 1975 album by American disco and soul singer Yvonne Fair
