= Terry Castro =

American jewelry designer (1972–2022)

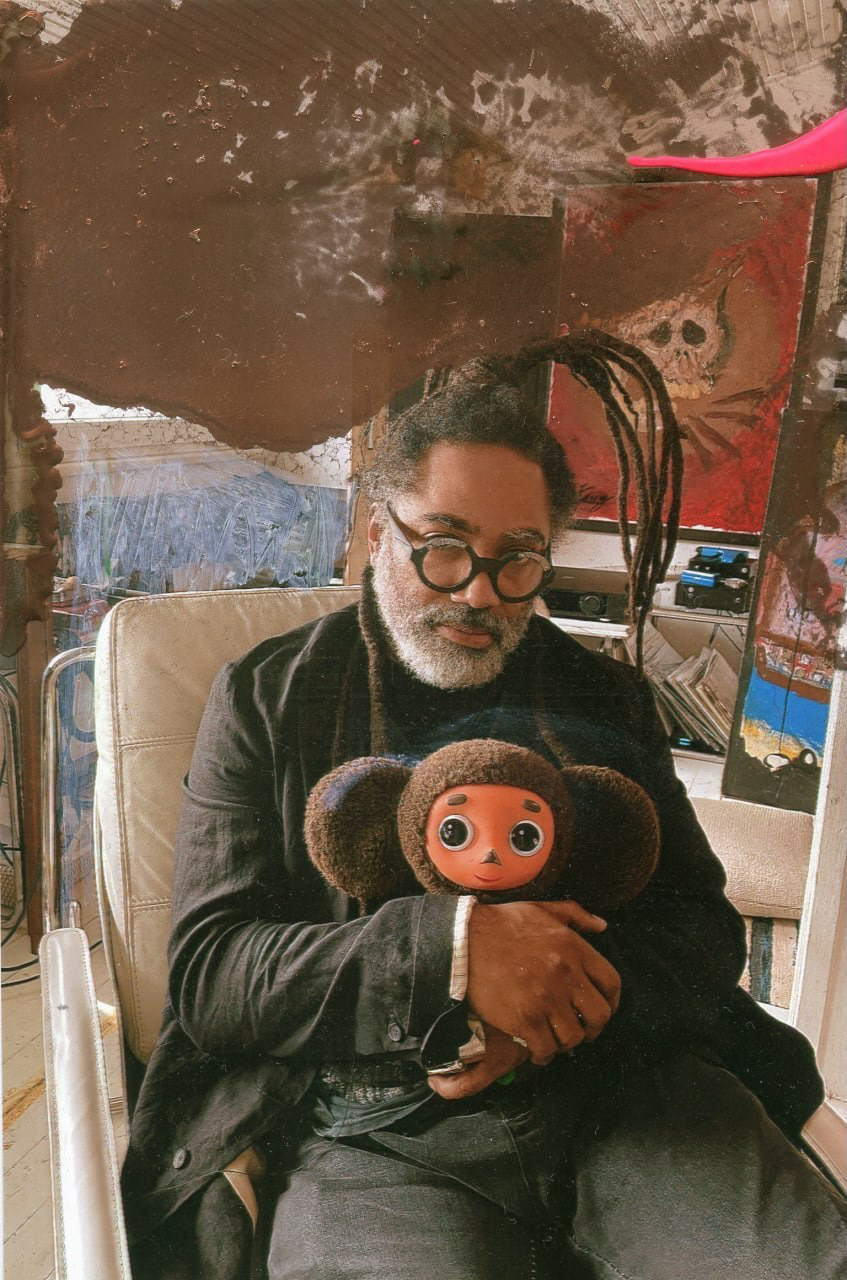
- Born: Terry Castro; 1972; Toledo, Ohio, United States
- Died: July 18, 2022 (aged 50); Istanbul, Turkey
- Education: Self-taught
- Known for: Jewelry design, Castro NYC
- Spouse: Belinda Castro (divorced)
- Children: SK Castro (born 1999)
- Website: castronyc.com

Terry Castro (1972–2022) was an American jewelry designer and founder of the jewelry practice Castro NYC. Castro's work drew from West African cultural heritage and addressed themes of identity, spirituality, and mortality. Following his death in 2022, the brand continues under the creative direction of his son, SK Castro.

== Early life and education ==
Terry Castro was born in 1972 in Toledo, Ohio. Castro's mother, Mary, was a major early influence on his taste and style.

Castro was entirely self-taught in jewelry making. His entry into the field began when he wanted to possess jewelry himself and met someone with a jewelry store who suggested he learn jewelry repair. This foundation taught him to dismantle and reconstruct pieces, which became part of his creative process.

== Career ==
=== New York (2006–2016) ===
Castro moved to New York City in 2006, marking the official beginning of Castro NYC. He initially sold his jewelry from a street table in SoHo, where he built his customer base over many years.

During this period, Castro attracted collectors, artists, and designers who became advocates for his career. He worked with clients including Whoopi Goldberg, Steven Tyler, and Billy Gibbons from ZZ Top.

Castro said that he aimed to create jewelry that made clients "feel like rap stars" and described his clients as strong, confident individuals, stating that his female clients had to be "strong already" because his pieces were not for those who followed conventional trends. Castro described facing challenges related to racial assumptions in the jewelry industry. He recalled an interview at Barneys where the buyer said, "when I walked in we thought you were some skinny white dude with a bunch of tattoos" upon seeing his skull collections. At one point, Castro admitted he didn't want his face shown because he was afraid it might affect sales.

=== Istanbul (2016–2022) ===
In 2016, Castro relocated to Istanbul, Turkey, where he established a design studio. He worked with Armenian craftspeople and Turkish artisans with roots in classic Ottoman jewelry-making, while outsourcing certain production elements to specialized makers in Geneva and Athens.

Castro's decision to leave New York was influenced by the series of racially motivated incidents in 2014. As he explained, he believed "the source is in Africa, and I need to go to the source. Maybe I don't stay but I need to go to the source. I need to make a pilgrimage".

== Artistic style ==
Castro described his aesthetic as "eclectic". It has been described as including a fusion of gothic and surrealist elements. Castro challenged traditional interpretations of his work, particularly regarding gothic and medieval influences. Through his research into European cathedrals, he argued: "As I was doing more research for example on these cathedrals, where did that influence come from in Spain? Oh, it came from the people who crossed over from Africa... So, I am not really doing gothic I am actually doing African".

== Technique and materials ==
Castro initially worked with brass and bronze, materials he chose for their historical significance. He later incorporated precious stones and metals but never abandoned his original material choices. Throughout his career, Castro maintained an exclusive production model, creating only about 35 pieces per year.

== Selected works ==
=== Major pieces ===
- Falcon Crest Necklace (2021) — Features an antique bisque winged doll pendant set with diamonds, rubies, emeralds, and pearls. Inspired by shields and bronze plates from the kingdom of Benin.
- Money Brooch (2021–2022) — Features Muzo emeralds, displayed at Sotheby's exhibitions
- Catmando Ring — Features an antique carved jade leopard with rubies, emeralds, and sapphires
- Lock Pendants Series
- The Marauder Ring — Gold, diamonds and sapphire piece inspired by A Tribe Called Quest's Midnight Marauders
- Drip Earrings (2021) — 18k gold and sterling silver with diamonds and garnets

== Exhibitions ==
=== Major exhibitions ===
- Sotheby's "Brilliant & Black: A Jewelry Renaissance" (September 2021) — Curated by Melanie Grant, featuring 21 Black jewelry designers.
- Sotheby's "Brilliant & Black: Age of Enlightenment" (September–October 2022, London) — Posthumous inclusion in follow-up exhibition
- "Castro NYC Futurespective" (October 8, 2024 – January 11, 2025, Carpenters, London) — Major retrospective featuring more than 40 pieces, organized by SK Castro.

== Personal life ==
Castro was married to Belinda Castro, with whom he had his son SK in 1999. After their divorce, SK spent summers in New York City with Castro, often helping in the workshop. Castro died suddenly on July 18, 2022, from a heart attack at his home in Istanbul at age 50.

Following Castro's death, his work experienced significant price appreciation. According to Tamara Platisa of Carpenters Workshop Gallery, "The work of Terry Castro is finally getting the recognition it always deserved, and with that comes an increased demand for each unique piece".
