= Christian Heritage Academy =

Christian school in Oklahoma, US

Coordinates: 35.436815°N 97.439035°W

- Del City, Oklahoma; United States

Information
- Other name: CHA
- Type: Private
- Motto: Isaiah 58:12b "and thou shalt be called, The repairer of the breach, The restorer of paths to dwell in."
- Established: 1972
- Headmaster: Jeff Schapansky
- Colors: Red, white and blue
- Mascot: Crusader
- Website: www.cha.org

Christian Heritage Academy (CHA) is a private Christian school located in Del City, Oklahoma, United States. Established in 1972, CHA instructs its students in an American Christian philosophy of education through the Principle Approach methodology. Enrollment includes students from grades pre-Kindergarten through twelve.

The mascot of the Christian Heritage Academy is the Crusader. The school colors are red, white and blue.

== Curriculum ==
CHA's curriculum is based on the Principle Approach developed by Verna M. Hall and Rosalie Slater. This approach to education states that "the pinnacle of classical education was reached in [the United States of America]...two centuries ago". The Principle Approach concept of "Providential History" maintains that "God commands us to make nations Christian" nations, that only "Providential history is true history", and that "the failure to teach Providential history has led to the secularization of America".

Principle Approach uses Noah Webster's 1828 American Dictionary of the English Language and maintains that "It will equip you for Christian leadership, strengthen your vocabulary, give you an edge in communicating your view and become your foundation for thinking and reasoning Biblically". Also, it is taught that for one "to understand principles of liberty, one must return to the thought and writings of those whom God used to establish the first Christian constitutional representative Republic the world has ever known".

== History ==
=== Opening ===
In spring 1972, Sunnyside Baptist Church pastor Harry Boydstun invited Mel and Norma Gabler to speak about their work at a Wednesday night service. The Gablers, who had only one year of secondary education, had achieved outsized influence over Texas school textbooks. They claimed that America was losing its Christian heritage because children were never introduced to it in schools: "Allowing a student to come to his own conclusion about abstracts and concepts creates frustration. Ideas, situation ethics, values, anti-God humanism — that's what the schools are teaching. And concepts. Well, a concept will never do anyone as much good as a fact". During the service, Boydstun sensed a mission to provide education within a Christian setting for the students of southwest Oklahoma City.

After further discussion, the church established a committee to investigate the feasibility of a Christian school and later to begin developing the school program.

On September 1, 1972, Christian Heritage Academy opened with 200 students, first through eighth grades, meeting in the south Oklahoma City facilities of Sunnyside Baptist Church but separately incorporated.

Toward the end of the first year, Ralph Bullard was hired as headmaster. Bullard’s first meeting with O'Brien led him to adopt the school’s educational philosophy: The Principle Approach to America’s Christian History, Government, and Education. In her office, he saw two reference volumes: "Christian History of the Constitution of the United States of America" and "Teaching and Learning America’s Christian History." He ordered a set for the school.

Among his advisors were R.J. Rushdoony; Hall and Slater, the authors of the books; and officers of The Foundation for American Christian Education in San Francisco, California; and later, John Talcott, member of the Evangelical Council for National Policy, a director of the Ocean Spray Corporation and founder of Plymouth Rock Foundation, whose Plymouth Rock Seminars were foundational to the school’s philosophical development; Katherine Dang, then the principal of the Chinese Christian Schools of San Leandro, California, and teacher at the pilot school in Hayward, California, under the direction of CHA development contributor James B. Rose; and Ruth Smith of Pilgrim Institute. All provided advice as CHA developed its program and became one of the leaders in the American Christian History movement (see Dominionism).

Thereafter, a kindergarten was added and one upper grade each year until the school had a complete high school program, graduating its first senior class in 1977. Two senior traditions were established with the first graduating class: The American Christian Heritage Tour of the Massachusetts cities of Boston, Plymouth, Lexington, Concord, and Salem taken in the spring before graduation, and a graduation ceremony in which each graduating senior is lauded for their positive character qualities and impact within their class..

On October 20, 1978, CHA sponsored its first American Christian Teachers Seminar. During the seminar, faculty of CHA shared the Principle Approach and the American Christian Philosophy of Education with representatives from other Christian schools within Oklahoma. As of 2010, CHA remains the only Principle Approach school in Oklahoma..

=== 1980s ===
==== Establishment of a Christian philosophy of athletics ====
The school wrote a "Christian philosophy of athletics" to guide students' athletic development and to reflect Christian values on the playing field and in the stands: "Since we are ambassadors for Jesus Christ, let us conduct ourselves in word and action just as Christ would conduct himself. Therefore, all that we do, we will do with a total release of our mental and physical abilities and our emotional energies towards our performance, having in mind that Christ is our only audience. Concerning our attitude towards players and fans of the opposing team, we will strive 'to love our neighbor as ourselves' and 'do unto them as we would have them do unto us.'"

In the early days of the homeschool movement, Cynthia Bower taught phonics classes to groups of homeschooling mothers in the summer, and the school began providing annual achievement testing. CHA developed programs to equip parents to teach, including the Home School Satellite Program, which also allows students to participate in some school events and/or classes. Many of these students later enroll in CHA proper.

While reading about the state of Christian education, Ralph Bullard noticed that suggestions for what Christian schools should do seemed shallow to him. He discussed his findings with Tom Elliff, the senior pastor of First South Baptist Church and a patron of the school. As they tried to answer the question, “What are we educating them for?” one of the answers was, “We are educating them to reach out to others, not just at home but abroad.” This led to an emphasis on missions, not just with money and local help but actually working with missionaries outside the United States. Since 1988, many students at CHA have participated in an annual mission trip to Mexico. There has also been one trip to Russia and two to Brazil.

=== 1990s ===
In 1996, CHA hosted then-presidential candidate Pat Buchanan for his Oklahoma Republican pre-primary rally.

CHA published "God Fashioned the Continents for His Story," an essay that says, "Are there physical signs of the intentional hand of Providence? If the Lord truly has foresight (which He does), and if He planned the story that would unfold on earth (which He did), then wouldn’t it make sense that He would create the continents to oblige?" God is described as a "Master Painter" who is putting together the continents with a purpose, thus Asia, Europe, and North America are described as having been "admirably prepared" as opposed to South America, Africa, and Australia which are relegated to their plant, animal, and wildlife. It says the United States can be found in the Bible and that "His design should point to the work of Christ in human history — the story of liberty."

Echoing R.J. Rushdoony and other Christian dominionists, it says Native Americans "occupied but did not possess the land" in spite of overwhelming evidence that tribes in North America had a history and civilization for thousands of years, It says North America "was not designed to give birth and development to a new civilization but to receive one ready-made" and that it invited colonization through Manifest Destiny... "it seems to invite the European race, the people of progress, to new fields of action, to encourage their expansion throughout its entire territory."

The publication also carries the following quote from Alexis de Tocqueville:

Although [North America] was inhabited by many indigenous tribes, it may be justly said, at the time of its discovery by Europeans, to have formed one great desert. The Indians occupied it without possessing it. The whole continent seemed prepared to be the abode of a great nation yet unborn.

=== 2000s ===
In 2007 CHA sued the Oklahoma Secondary Schools Athletic Association, seeking membership. In "Christian Heritage Academy v. Oklahoma Secondary School Activities Ass’n, 483 F.3d 1025 (United States Court of Appeals, Tenth Circuit, 2007)" claimed that OSSAA's membership requirements for nonpublic schools violated the Equal Protection Clause". "For athletics, OSSAA determines athletic divisions, sets eligibility rules, and holds state play-offs and championships". Although one of the judges described CHA's argument as a "doctrinal morass", OSSAA's decision was remanded.

As of 2009, CHA along with other private schools, will not be forced to move "up" in the Oklahoma Secondary School Activities Association division classifications.

As of 2011, CHA was categorized as an OSSAA 2A Football Program, with an enrollment of 216 secondary students.

=== Association With Reclaiming America For Christ ===
CHA's association with the right-wing evangelical and socially conservative political group called the Center for Reclaiming America for Christ centers around the controversial Rev. Paul Blair, former OSU and NFL football player who became CHA's football coach and pastor at the Fairview Baptist Church in Edmond, Oklahoma, where he facilitates the CHA North satellite. The Center was founded by the late D. James Kennedy of Coral Ridge Ministries and folded shortly after his death in 2007. Blair took over the Center, and renamed it Reclaiming America for Christ, with the full support and blessing of Coral Ridge. Over breakfast, Blair decided to form "Reclaim Oklahoma for Christ" with Charlie Meadows, a John Birch Society member, politically right-wing evangelical activist, and former Oklahoma Congressional candidate.

=== Notable alumni ===
- Brett James – Class of 1985
