= Done by the Forces of Nature =

Studio album by Jungle Brothers
- Released: November 7, 1989
- Recorded: 1989
- Genre: Hip-hop, golden age hip-hop
- Length: 60:07
- Label: Warner Bros.
- Producer: Jungle Brothers; Kool DJ Red Alert (exec.)

Jungle Brothers chronology
Straight out the Jungle (1988)	Done by the Forces of Nature (1989)	J Beez wit the Remedy (1993)

Done by the Forces of Nature is the second studio album by American hip hop group Jungle Brothers, released on November 7, 1989, by Warner Bros. Records. Recording sessions for the album took place in 1989 at Calliope Studios in New York City, and production was handled by the Jungle Brothers. It was mixed at Apollo Studios by Kool DJ Red Alert and the Jungle Brothers. The album's title may refer to a line from the Bhagavad Gita, a Hindu scripture, wherein Krishna says, "Those who are deluded by the illusive power (Maya) of Nature become attached to the work done by the forces of nature," 3:28.

Done by the Forces of Nature peaked at number 46 on Billboard's Top R&B/Hip-Hop Albums chart. It also received rave reviews from music critics who praised its Afrocentric themes, clever lyrics, house-influenced production, and eclectic sampling of music genres such as jazz, R&B, funk, and African music. Done by the Forces of Nature has been considered a golden age hip hop classic, as well as one of the greatest and influential hip hop albums of all time. In 1998, it was included in The Source magazine's "100 Best Albums" list.

== Recording ==
Recording sessions for the album took place in 1989 at Calliope Studios in New York City, and production was handled by the Jungle Brothers. It was mixed at Apollo Studios by Kool DJ Red Alert and the Jungle Brothers.

== Reception and legacy ==
Professional ratings
Review scores
Source	Rating
AllMusic	4.5/5 stars
Chicago Tribune	4/4 stars
Los Angeles Times	4/5 stars
Mojo	5/5 stars
NME	10/10
Q	4/5 stars
Rolling Stone	4/5 stars
The Rolling Stone Album Guide	4/5 stars
Spin Alternative Record Guide	7/10
The Village Voice	A

In a positive review for Spin, Greg Tate hailed Done by the Forces of Nature as an innovative hip house production and, "a nonstop groove-a-think where sexist spectacle commingles with love paeans to the sistuhs, where safaris into Afro-centricity are made to house you." Robert Tanzilo from the Chicago Tribune called it "one of the brightest records of the year". Los Angeles Times critic Duff Marlowe praised the album's diverse sound and lyrical themes, including social consciousness and individual self-realization. He wrote that the Jungle Brothers "present a vision of urbanized naturalism, a subversive and funky anti-intellectualism". Steve Morse of The Boston Globe called the album "some seriously intense music that makes the commercial raps of Tone-Loc and DJ Jazzy Jeff & Fresh Prince sound like a child's play". Peter Watrous from The New York Times observed lyrical allusions to hip hop and African-American culture that are "enriching an always solid dance beat".

In Rolling Stone, Michael Azerrad praised the Jungle Brothers' lyrical substance and said their "positive, spiritual vibe (a direct descendant of Earth, Wind and Fire's) is as hip as their music". Yahoo! Music's Brett Anderson described it as the Jungle Brothers' "stab at edutainment". Steve Huey from AllMusic praised the album's eclectic sound and sampling of music genres such as jazz, R&B, and African music. In comparing the album to the Jungle Brothers' landmark debut album, Straight out the Jungle (1988), Huey wrote that Done by the Forces of Nature "feels more realized in many respects, and is arguably the more satisfying listen". French newspaper Le Monde called the album "brilliant". Robert Christgau of The Village Voice found its sound "as original as De La Soul's, and the dreams of pleasure are straight out the urban jungle":

Somehow these young Afro-New Yorkers have evolved a rap version of urban African pop at its most life-affirming: the boasts low-key, the propaganda beyond hostility, the samples evoking everything tolerant and humane in recent black-music memory, this is music designed to comfort and sustain.

The album has been considered a classic of hip hop's golden age and one of the most influential albums in hip hop. It has also been described by critics as an "underrated classic". Michael Azerrad, writing in Trouser Press, said that it was "largely overlooked," but is "one of rap's finest hours" with a "highly musical hip-hop" that "radiates upbeat spirituality". The Chicago Tribune's Rick Reger called it a "masterpiece ... one of hip-hop's most imaginative, engaging records". In retrospect, Rolling Stone's Nathan Brackett wrote "At their prime in the late '80s, the Jungle Brothers reflected all of hip-hop's potential – their second album, 1989's spiritual, street-wise Done by the Forces of Nature, was as conscious as it was funky and stands out as one of the most overlooked rap albums of that decade." In The New Rolling Stone Album Guide, Peter Relic comments that the "Jungle Brothers were ahead of their time" with the album and cites the track "Doin' Our Own Dang" as "the definitive Native Tongues posse cut". Rolling Stone placed the album thirty-seventh on its list of "The 50 Coolest Records". In 1998, Done by the Forces of Nature was included in The Source's "100 Best Albums" list. The album was also included in the book 1001 Albums You Must Hear Before You Die.

== Track listing ==
All songs composed by the Jungle Brothers, except "Doin' Our Own Dang", which was composed by De La Soul, the Jungle Brothers, Q-Tip, and Monie Love.

1. "Beyond This World" – 4:08
2. "Feelin' Alright" – 3:35
3. "Sunshine" – 3:44
4. "What U Waitin' 4?" – 4:02
5. "U Make Me Sweat" – 3:59
6. "Acknowledge Your Own History" (with Vinia Mojica) – 3:38
7. "Belly Dancin' Dina" – 3:41
8. "Good Newz Comin'" – 4:37
9. "Done by the Forces of Nature" (with Jungle DJ Towha Towha) – 3:47
10. "Beeds on a String" – 3:32
11. "Tribe Vibes" (with KRS-One) – 3:53
12. "J. Beez Comin' Through" – 3:32
13. "Black Woman" (with Caron Wheeler) – 3:54
14. "In Dayz 2 Come" – 3:54
15. "Doin' Our Own Dang" (with De La Soul, Queen Latifah, Q-Tip, and Monie Love) – 4:16
16. "Kool Accordin' "2" a Jungle Brother" – 1:55

(*)The European version has "Doin' Our Own Dang (Do It To The JB's Mix)" as track 1 and "What U Waitin' 4? (Jungle Fever Mix)" as track 5, replacing the versions of those songs on the other release.

== Charts ==
Chart (1990)	Peak position
Australian Albums (ARIA)	102
Dutch Albums (Album Top 100)	84
New Zealand Albums (RMNZ)	50
UK Albums (OCC)	41
US Top R&B/Hip-Hop Albums (Billboard)	46

== Personnel ==
- Jungle Brothers - design, reproduction
- DJ Red Alert - executive producer, mixing
- A Tribe Called Quest - performer
- De La Soul - performer
- KRS-One - performer
- Monie Love - performer
- Gregg Mann - engineer
- Greg Curry - engineer
- Dr. Shane Faber - keyboards, engineer
- Abdullah Rahman - artwork
- DJ Towa - design
- DJ Towa Towa - performer
- Caron Wheeler - performer

== See also ==
- Album era

== Bibliography ==
- Doran, John (2006). "Jungle Brothers: Done by the Forces of Nature". In Dimery, Robert (ed.). 1001 Albums You Must Hear Before You Die. Universe Publishing. ISBN 978-0-7893-1371-3.
- Larkin, Colin, ed. (2002). The Virgin Encyclopedia of Popular Music (concise 4th ed.). Virgin Books. ISBN 1-85227-923-0.
- Relic, Peter (2004). "Jungle Brothers". In Brackett, Nathan; Hoard, Christian (eds.). The New Rolling Stone Album Guide (4th ed.). Simon & Schuster. ISBN 0-7432-0169-8.
- Weisbard, Eric (1995). "Jungle Brothers". In Weisbard, Eric; Marks, Craig (eds.). Spin Alternative Record Guide. Vintage Books. ISBN 0-679-75574-8.
