= Adeva! =

1989 studio album by Adeva

Studio album by Adeva
- Released: 28 August 1989
- Studio: Quantum Studios
- Label: Cooltempo/Chrysalis (Europe); Capitol/EMI (US)
- Producer: Smack Productions; Paul Simpson

Adeva chronology
Adeva! (1989)	Love or Lust? (1991)

Singles from Adeva!
- 1. "In and Out of My Life" Released: 1988; 2. "Respect" Released: 1988; 3. "Musical Freedom (Free at Last)" Released: 1989; 4. "Warning!" Released: 1989; 5. "I Thank You" Released: 1989; 6. "Beautiful Love" Released: 1989; 7. "Treat Me Right" Released: 1990

Adeva! is the debut album by American singer Adeva, released in 1989. It features the singles "Respect" (UK No. 17), "Musical Freedom (Free At Last)" (UK No. 22), "Warning!" (UK No. 17), "I Thank You" (UK No. 17), "Beautiful Love" (UK No. 57) and "Treat Me Right" (UK No. 62). The album was particularly successful in the United Kingdom, where it reached No. 6 in the UK Albums Chart and was certified platinum by the British Phonographic Industry for UK sales exceeding 300,000 copies.

== Critical reception ==
Professional ratings
Review scores
Source	Rating
AllMusic	4/5 stars

In a retrospective review for AllMusic, Alex Henderson praised "big-voiced" Adeva's "aggressive, gospel-influenced belting", calling it "a throwback to the days of Gloria Gaynor, Grace Jones, Linda Clifford, and Loleatta Holloway.

== Track listing ==
UK version
No.	Title	Writer(s)	Length
1.	"Respect"	Otis Redding	4:06
2.	"Treat Me Right"	Roger Cozine; Troy Patterson	3:08
3.	"I Thank You"	Kevin Lewis; Patterson	3:45
4.	"So Right"	Patterson; Michael Cameron; Debbie Parkin; Patricia Daniels; L. Rodriguez	4:39
5.	"In and Out of My Life"	Tony Jackson; Parkin; Daniels; Rod Goode	4:45
6.	"Warning!"	Parkin; Rico Tyler; Goode	4:43
7.	"I Don't Need You"	Daniels; Patterson	3:36
8.	"Beautiful Love"	Patterson; Keith Jacks; Daniels	4:32
9.	"Promises"	Parkin; Troy Patterson	4:02
10.	"Musical Freedom" (featuring Paul Simpson and Carmen Marie)	Paul Simpson; Carmen Brown	6:21
11.	"I Thank You" (Club Mix)	Lewis; Patterson	5:08
12.	"Warning!" (Dangerous Dub Mix)	Parkin; Tyler; Goode	6:03
13.	"Respect" (The Dancing Danny D Remix; featuring Monie Love)	Redding	8:28

Note

- Tracks 11–13 available on CD only, or as part of the vinyl limited edition version that included the extra tracks as a free 12" single.

US version
No.	Title	Writer(s)	Length
1.	"Warning!"	Parkin; Tyler; Goode	3:08
2.	"Treat Me Right"	Cozine; Patterson	3:53
3.	"I Thank You"	Lewis; Patterson	3:38
4.	"So Right"	Patterson; Cameron; Parkin; Daniels; Rodriguez	4:40
5.	"Love to See You Dancin"	Cameron; Patterson	3:52
6.	"In and Out of My Life"	Jackson; Parkin; Daniels; Goode	4:46
7.	"Beautiful Love"	Patterson; Jacks; Daniels	3:20
8.	"I Don't Need You"	Daniels; Patterson	3:36
9.	"Respect"	Redding	4:05
10.	"Promises"	Parkin; Patterson	3:49
11.	"Musical Freedom" (featuring Paul Simpson and Carmen Marie)	Simpson; Brown	6:22
12.	"Respect" (A Little Bit of Love Mix; featuring Monie Love)	Redding	8:31
13.	"Love Is Special"	Patterson	5:06

Note

- Although titled differently, track 12 is the same remix as track 13 on the UK CD version.

== Personnel ==
Adapted from the album's liner notes.

- Adeva – lead vocals
- Carmen Brown – background vocals
- Michael Cameron – drum programming
- Roger Cozine – keyboards
- Rod Goode – drum programming
- Keith Jacks – guitar, assistant engineer
- Tony Jenkins – background vocals
- Frank Jones – background vocals
- Kevin Lewis – keyboards
- Andrew MacPherson – photography
- Brenda Mickens – background vocals
- Russ Kip Moore – saxophone, engineer
- Troy Patterson – keyboards, drum programming, background vocals
- Pablovia Raban – mixing
- Rico Tyler – keyboards, drum programming

== Charts ==
=== Weekly charts ===
Weekly chart performance for Adeva!
Chart (1989–90)	Peak position
Australian Albums (ARIA)	14
European Albums (European Top 100 Albums)	28
German Albums (Offizielle Top 100)	28
UK Albums (OCC)	6

=== Year-end charts ===
1989 year-end chart performance for Adeva!
Chart (1989)	Position
UK Albums (OCC)	80

== Certifications ==
Sale certifications for Adeva!
Region	Certification	Certified units/sales
United Kingdom (BPI)	Platinum	300,000^{^}
^{^} Shipments figures based on certification alone.
