= Down to Earth (Monie Love album) =

Studio album by Monie Love
- Released: 30 October 1990
- Recorded: 1988–1990
- Genres: Hip-hop; pop rap
- Length: 49:12
- Label: Warner Bros.
- Producers: Afrika Baby Bam; Jerry Callendar; the Beatnuts; Dancin' Danny D; Andy Cox; David Steele; Richie Fermie

Monie Love chronology
Down to Earth (1990)	In a Word or 2 (1993)

Singles from Down to Earth
- 1. "I Can Do This" Released: 1988; 2. "Grandpa's Party" Released: 1989; 3. "Monie in the Middle" Released: 1990; 4. "It's a Shame (My Sister)" Released: December 1990; 5. "Down 2 Earth" Released: 1990; 6. "Ring My Bell" Released: 1991

Down to Earth is the debut studio album by English rapper Monie Love. It was released on 30 October 1990 on Warner Bros. Records. It peaked at 109 on the Billboard 200 and at 26 on the Top R&B/Hip-Hop Albums, and spawned three charting singles. "It's a Shame (My Sister)" became Monie's only top-40 hit in the US, and peaked at 26 on the Billboard Hot 100, while "Monie in the Middle" and "Down 2 Earth" were both successful on the R&B and hip-hop charts.

== Critical reception ==
Professional ratings
Review scores
Source	Rating
AllMusic	3.5/5 stars
Calgary Herald	B
Chicago Tribune	2/4 stars
Entertainment Weekly	A−
NME	8/10
Orlando Sentinel	5/5 stars
Select	3/5 medals
The Village Voice	A−

In a contemporary review for The Village Voice, music critic Robert Christgau gave Down to Earth an "A−" and was impressed by Love's proud sensibilities, as she "radiates sisterhood even though she concentrates on the guys, and positivity and tradition" without much culturally or politically conscious lyrics. The New York Times concluded that the album was "a letdown, as it settles for midtempo pop raps with slight insights". Alex Henderson, in a retrospective review for AllMusic, wrote that Love raps well, but lacks worthwhile stories on an otherwise good album.

At the 33rd Grammy Awards, "Monie in the Middle" was nominated for Best Rap Solo Performance, but lost to MC Hammer's "U Can't Touch This". The following year at the 34th Grammy Awards, she was nominated for Best Rap Solo Performance again for "It's a Shame (My Sister)" but lost to LL Cool J's "Mama Said Knock You Out".

== Track listing ==
1. "Monie in the Middle" (Monie Love, Steele) – 3:45
2. "It's a Shame (My Sister)" (Garrett, Monie Love, Wonder; sample performed by Love, True Image; additional vocals by Ultra Naté) – 3:43
3. "Don't Funk wid the Mo" (Callendar, Hall, Maxwell) – 3:33
4. "Ring My Bell" (Fermie, Monie Love) – 3:52
5. "R U Single" (Callendar, Hall, Maxwell) – 4:07
6. "Just Don't Give a Damn" (Callendar, Hall, Maxwell) – 3:57
7. "What I'm Supposed 2 B" (Callendar) – 3:49
8. "Dettrimentally Stable" (Callendar, Hall, Maxwell) – 3:28
9. "Down 2 Earth" (Callendar, Hall, Maxwell) – 4:03
10. "I Do as I Please" (Monie Love, Steele) – 3:53
11. "Pups Lickin' Bone" (Monie Love, Tineo) – 4:00
12. "Read Between the Lines" (Callendar, Hall, Maxwell) – 3:50
13. "Race Against Reality" (Callendar, Maxwell, Love, Hall) – 3:03
14. "Swiney Swiney" (Callendar, Maxwell, Love, Hall) – 3:12
15. "Give It 2 U Like This" (Callendar, Maxwell, Love, Hall) – 4:03
16. "I Can Do This (Uptown Mix)" (Pogo, Sylvers, Love, Shockley, Shellby) – 3:24
17. "I'm Driving You Crazy" (Steele, Love) – 4:16
18. "Grandpa's Party" (Love II Love Remix) (Love, Fermie) – 5:49

Note: Tracks 7, 13, 15, 16, and 17 were included on the UK edition but omitted from the US edition.

== Samples ==
- "Monie in the Middle"
  - "Black Grass" by Bad Bascomb
  - "Willie Whopper" by Willie Colón
  - "I Wouldn't Change a Thing" by Coke Escovedo
- "I Can Do This (Uptown Mix)"
  - "And the Beat Goes On" by the Whispers
  - "Hot Pants (Bonus Beats)" by Bobby Byrd
- "It's a Shame (My Sister)"
  - "It's a Shame" by the Spinners, written by Stevie Wonder
- "R U Single"
  - "Single Life" by Cameo
- "Just Don't Give a Damn"
  - "Who Knows" by Jimi Hendrix
  - "The Soil I Tilled for You" by the Shades of Brown
- "What I'm Supposed 2 B"
  - "N.T." by Kool and the Gang
  - "Eric B. Is President" by Eric B. & Rakim
  - "Feel Good" by Fancy
- "Dettrimentally Stable"
  - "Ball of Confusion (That's What the World Is Today)" by the Temptations
- "Down 2 Earth"
  - "Hey Uh-What You Say Come On" by Roy Ayers Ubiquity
  - "Shangri La" by La Pregunta
  - "I Wouldn't Change a Thing" by Coke Escovedo
- "Pups Lickin' Bone"
  - "Good Old Music" by Funkadelic
- "Read Between the Lines"
  - "I Like (What You're Doing to Me)" by Young & Company
  - "Take This Train to Freedom" by New Birth
- "Race Against Reality"
  - "Kitty Bey" by Byron Morris & Unity
- "Swiney Swiney"
  - "Advice" by Sly & the Family Stone

== Charts ==
=== Weekly charts ===
Chart (1990–1991)	Peak position
Australian Albums (ARIA)	114
Austrian Albums (Ö3 Austria)	29
Swiss Albums (Schweizer Hitparade)	32
UK Albums (Official Charts)	30
US Billboard 200	109
US Top R&B/Hip-Hop Albums (Billboard)	26

=== Year-end charts ===
Chart (1991)	Position
US Top R&B/Hip-Hop Albums (Billboard)	55
