= Christian Hoard =

American music journalist and music editor

Christian David Hoard is an American music journalist and music editor for Rolling Stone. A 2000 graduate of the University of Michigan, he began his career as a music journalist writing for the Michigan Daily. He later moved to New York City, where he interned for the Village Voice and met Robert Christgau, who became his mentor. Christgau also later convinced his colleagues at Rolling Stone to allow Hoard to write for the magazine after Hoard became an intern there; he later became the magazine's senior editor. Along with Nathan Brackett, he co-edited The New Rolling Stone Album Guide, which was published in 2004. In 2016, he replaced Brackett as Rolling Stone's music editor.
