= 23rd Producers Guild of America Awards =

23rd Annual Producers Guild Awards
- Date: January 21, 2012
- Location: The Beverly Hilton, Beverly Hills, California
- Country: United States
- Presented by: Producers Guild of America

Highlights
- Best Producer(s) Motion Picture: The Artist – Thomas Langmann
- Best Producer(s) Animated Feature: The Adventures of Tintin – Peter Jackson, Kathleen Kennedy, and Steven Spielberg
- Best Producer(s) Documentary Motion Picture: Beats, Rhymes & Life: The Travels of A Tribe Called Quest – Michael Rapaport, Edward Parks, Frank Mele, and Debra Koffler

The 23rd Producers Guild of America Awards (also known as 2012 Producers Guild Awards), honoring the best film and television producers of 2011, were held at The Beverly Hilton Hotel in Beverly Hills, California on January 21, 2012. The documentary nominations were announced on December 2, 2011, the television nominations on December 7, 2011, and the motion picture nominations on January 3, 2012.

== Winners and nominees ==
=== Film ===
Darryl F. Zanuck Award for Outstanding Producer of Theatrical Motion Pictures
- The Artist – Thomas Langmann
  - Bridesmaids – Judd Apatow, Barry Mendel, and Clayton Townsend
  - The Descendants – Jim Burke, Alexander Payne, and Jim Taylor
  - The Girl with the Dragon Tattoo – Ceán Chaffin and Scott Rudin
  - The Help – Michael Barnathan, Chris Columbus, and Brunson Green
  - Hugo – Graham King and Martin Scorsese
  - The Ides of March – George Clooney, Grant Heslov, and Brian Oliver
  - Midnight in Paris – Letty Aronson and Stephen Tenenbaum
  - Moneyball – Michael De Luca, Rachael Horovitz, and Brad Pitt
  - War Horse – Kathleen Kennedy and Steven Spielberg
Outstanding Producer of Animated Theatrical Motion Pictures
- The Adventures of Tintin – Steven Spielberg, Peter Jackson, and Kathleen Kennedy
  - Cars 2 – Denise Ream
  - Kung Fu Panda 2 – Melissa Cobb
  - Puss in Boots – Latifa Ouaou and Joe M. Aguilar
  - Rango – Gore Verbinski and John B. Carls
Outstanding Producer of Documentary Theatrical Motion Pictures
- Beats, Rhymes & Life: The Travels of A Tribe Called Quest – Michael Rapaport, Edward Parks, Frank Mele, and Debra Koffler
  - Bill Cunningham New York – Philip Gefter
  - Project Nim – Simon Chinn
  - Senna – James Gay-Rees
  - The Union – Cameron Crowe and Michelle Panek

=== Television ===
Norman Felton Award for Outstanding Producer of Episodic Television, Drama
- Boardwalk Empire
  - Dexter
  - Game of Thrones
  - The Good Wife
  - Mad Men
Danny Thomas Award for Outstanding Producer of Episodic Television, Comedy
- Modern Family
  - 30 Rock
  - The Big Bang Theory
  - Glee
  - Parks and Recreation
David L. Wolper Award for Outstanding Producer of Long-Form Television
- Downton Abbey
  - Cinema Verite
  - The Kennedys
  - Mildred Pierce
  - Too Big to Fail
Outstanding Producer of Non-Fiction Television
- American Masters
  - 30 for 30
  - Anthony Bourdain: No Reservations
  - Deadliest Catch
  - Undercover Boss
Outstanding Producer of Competition Television
- The Amazing Race
  - American Idol
  - Dancing with the Stars
  - Project Runway
  - Top Chef
Outstanding Producer of Live Entertainment & Talk Television
- The Colbert Report
  - The Ellen DeGeneres Show
  - Real Time with Bill Maher
  - Saturday Night Live
  - The 64th Annual Tony Awards
Outstanding Sports Program
- 30 for 30
  - 2010 FIFA World Cup
  - 2011 US Open
  - Monday Night Football
  - Real Sports with Bryant Gumbel
  - SportsCenter
Outstanding Children's Program
- Sesame Street
  - Dora the Explorer
  - iCarly
  - Phineas and Ferb
  - SpongeBob SquarePants
Outstanding News Program
- 60 Minutes
  - Anderson Cooper 360°
  - BBC World News America
  - NBC News with Brian Williams
  - The Rachel Maddow Show

=== Digital ===
Outstanding Web Series
- 30 Rock: Jack Donaghy, Executive Superhero
  - Ask a Ninja
  - The Guild
  - Parks and Recreation: April and Andy's Road Trip
  - Web Therapy

=== David O. Selznick Achievement Award in Theatrical Motion Pictures ===
- Steven Spielberg

=== Milestone Award ===
- Les Moonves

=== Norman Lear Achievement Award in Television ===
- Don Mischer

=== Stanley Kramer Award ===
- In the Land of Blood and Honey

=== Visionary Award ===
- Stan Lee
