= The Bitch Is Black =

Studio album by Yvonne Fair
- Released: 1975
- Recorded: 1972–1975
- Studio: Motown Recording Studios, Hollywood, California
- Genre: Disco, soul
- Length: 32:58
- Language: English
- Label: Motown
- Producer: Harvey Fuqua ("Stay a Little Longer"); Gloria Jones ("It's Bad for Me to See You"); Clay McMurray ("I Know (You Don't Love Me No More)"); Pam Sawyer ("It's Bad for Me to See You"); Norman Whitfield

The Bitch Is Black is a 1975 album by American disco and soul singer Yvonne Fair, released on Motown. After being signed to Motown eight years earlier and singing backing vocals for several acts as well as releasing a few singles of her own, Fair was given her first opportunity for a full-length, which also compiled several hit singles that she had recorded.

== Reception ==
Editors at AllMusic Guide scored this release 4.5 out of five stars, with critic Joe Viglione considering it "a thing of beauty deserving a wider audience" and opining that "It Should Have Been Me" "should have been a monster in the U.S."

== Track listing ==
1. "Funky Music Sho' 'Nuff Turns Me On" (Barrett Strong and Norman Whitfield) – 3:03
2. "It Should Have Been Me" (William "Mickey" Stevenson and Whitfield) – 3:33
3. "Stay a Little Longer" (Harvey Fuqua, Arthur C. Scott, and Vernon Williams) – 3:26
4. "It’s Bad for Me to See You" (Gloria Jones and Pam Sawyer) – 3:31
5. "Tell Me Something Good" (Stevie Wonder) – 3:27
6. "Let Your Hair Down" (Whitfield) – 4:07
7. "Love Ain’t No Toy" (Whitfield) – 3:23
8. "I Know (You Don’t Love Me No More)" (Barbara George) – 3:15
9. "Walk Out the Door If You Wanna" (Whitfield) – 2:15
10. "You Can’t Judge a Book by Its Cover" (Henry Cosby, Sylvia Moy, and Wonder) – 2:44

== Personnel ==
- Yvonne Fair – vocals

Additional musicians

- Eddie "Bongo" Brown – bongos, congas
- Dennis Coffey – guitar
- Henry Davis – bass guitar
- Mark Davis – keyboards
- James Gadson – drums
- Eddie Greene – drums
- James Jamerson – bass guitar
- Johnny McGhee – guitar
- Melvin Ragin – guitar
- Julia Waters Tillman – backing vocals
- Earl Van Dyke – keyboards
- Luther Waters – backing vocals
- Oren Waters – backing vocals
- Maxine Waters Willard – backing vocals
- Carolyn Willis – backing vocals
- Eddie Willis – guitar

Technical personnel

- Angel Balestier – engineering
- Art Attack – design
- Jim Britt – photography
- Harvey Fuqua – production on "Stay a Little Longer"
- A. Scott Galloway – liner notes on 2008 Reel Music CD re-release
- Asari Graham – creative assistance
- Gloria Jones – production on "It's Bad for Me to See You"
- Glenn Jordan – engineering
- Clay McMurray – production on "I Know (You Don't Love Me No More)"
- Katarina Pettersson – art direction
- Paul Riser – arrangement
- Bob Robitaille – engineering
- Pam Sawyer – production on "It's Bad for Me to See You"
- Art Stewart – engineering, mastering
- Norman Whitfield – arrangement, production on "Funky Music Sho' Nuff Turns Me On, "It Should Have Been Me", "Tell Me Something Good", "Let Your Hair Down", "Love Ain’t No Toy", "I Know (You Don’t Love Me No More)", "Walk Out the Door If You Wanna", and "You Can’t Judge a Book by Its Cover", mastering

== Sales and chart performance ==
The Bitch Is Black reached 57 on Billboard's R&B chart. The same publication conducted a survey of FM radio stations and found that this was one of the most-played LPs for the week of June 14, 1975. The album did not sell well in the United States, but was successful in Australia and the United Kingdom.

== See also ==
- List of 1975 albums
