= Born 2 B.R.E.E.D. =

1993 single by Monie Love

Single by Monie Love

from the album In a Word or 2
- Released: 9 February 1993
- Studio: Paisley Park
- Length: 3:53
- Label: Chrysalis
- Songwriters: Monie Love; Prince; Levi Seacer Jr.
- Producer: Prince

Monie Love singles chronology
"It's a Shame (My Sister)" (1990)	"Born 2 B.R.E.E.D." (1993)	"In a Word or 2" (1993)

"Born 2 B.R.E.E.D." is a song by British rapper, actress and radio personality Monie Love. It was written by Love with Prince and Levi Seacer Jr., and released in February 1993, by Chrysalis Records, as the second single from her second album, In a Word or 2 (1993). B.R.E.E.D. is an acronym for "Build Relationships where Education and Enlightenment Dominate". A remix produced by Steve "Silk" Hurley was also included on the album. In Love's native UK, the single went to number 18 on the Top Singles chart. As well the song peaked at No. 7 on the Dutch and No. 21 on the New Zealand Top Pop Singles charts. "Born 2 B.R.E.E.D." was Monie Love's most successful dance hit, reaching number one on the US Billboard Dance Music/Club Play Singles chart for one week. The song also peaked at No. 7 on the US Billboard Hot Rap Songs chart.

== Critical reception ==
Hiedi Siegmund of The Los Angeles Times noted, "Packing a proud feminist punch, the Prince-produced "Born 2 B.R.E.E.D." smartly responds to last year's single-mother brouhaha by attacking the notion that there's a "by-the-book" method of parenting. The song also explores the deterioration of inner-city schools, angrily asking, So tell me what do the kids learn at school / How to pack a pistol, how to play class fool?." Andy Beevers from Music Week gave the song four out of five and named it Pick of the Week in the category of Dance, noting that it is co-written and produced by Prince. He added, "Her catchy rap, based around her new status as a mother, is set against a ragga-style chorus and comes in a variety of strong mixes. Already picking up plenty of radio and club play, it is shaping up to be a pretty big hit."

Pan-European magazine Music & Media wrote, "Add a female rap to the classic Chic sound of the '70s, and you got it. We love it. Period." Parry Gettelman from Orlando Sentinel commented, "The combination of a slinky beat and disco-style strings and backing vocals works nicely, and funk-dancehall passages enliven things further. However, the song delivers a rather clouded message." Rupert Howe from Select said "Born 2 B.R.E.E.D." have "the sophistication of Claire Rayner giving advice on nappy changing."

== Charts ==
=== Weekly charts ===
Chart (1993)	Peak position
Australia (ARIA)	98
Europe (Eurochart Hot 100)	64
Europe (European Dance Radio)	5
Netherlands (Dutch Top 40 Tipparade)	7
Netherlands (Dutch Single Tip)	5
New Zealand (Recorded Music NZ)	21
Switzerland (Schweizer Hitparade)	35
UK Singles (OCC)	18
UK Airplay (Music Week)	18
UK Club Chart (Music Week)	5
US Billboard Hot 100	89
US Dance Music/Club Play Singles (Billboard)	1
US Hot R&B/Hip-Hop Songs (Billboard)	56
US Hot Rap Songs (Billboard)	7
US Maxi-Singles Sales (Billboard)	9

=== Year-end charts ===
Chart (1993)	Position
UK Club Chart (Music Week)	56

== See also ==
- List of number-one dance singles of 1993 (U.S.)
