= Midnight Marauders =

Studio album by A Tribe Called Quest
- Released: November 9, 1993
- Recorded: January – September 1993
- Studios: Battery, Platinum Island, and Sorcerer Sound in New York City
- Genres: East Coast hip-hop; jazz rap; alternative hip-hop; boom bap
- Length: 51:12
- Label: Jive
- Producers: A Tribe Called Quest; Skeff Anselm; Large Professor

A Tribe Called Quest chronology
The Low End Theory (1991)	Midnight Marauders (1993)	Beats, Rhymes and Life (1996)

Singles from Midnight Marauders
- 1. "Award Tour" Released: October 19, 1993; 2. "Electric Relaxation" Released: February 28, 1994; 3. "Oh My God" Released: May 30, 1994

Midnight Marauders is the third studio album by American hip-hop group A Tribe Called Quest, released on November 9, 1993, by Jive Records. The recording sessions for the album occurred at Battery Studios, Platinum Island Studios, and Sorcerer Sound in New York City. It was produced primarily by Q-Tip, with contributions from Skeff Anselm, Large Professor and the group's DJ, Ali Shaheed Muhammad. A culmination of the group's two previous albums, People's Instinctive Travels and the Paths of Rhythm and The Low End Theory, it features an eclectic, gritty sound based on jazz, funk, soul and R&B samples, in addition to socially conscious, positively-minded, and humorous lyrics.

Midnight Marauders debuted at number eight on the Billboard 200 and number one on the Top R&B/Hip-Hop Albums chart. The first two singles, "Electric Relaxation" and "Award Tour", charted on the Billboard Hot 100, before the release of the final single, "Oh My God". On January 14, 1994, the album was certified gold by the Recording Industry Association of America (RIAA), with shipments of 500,000 copies in the United States. It was certified platinum by the RIAA nearly a full year later, on January 11, 1995, with shipments of one million copies.

The album received mostly positive reviews from critics upon release. In the following years, Midnight Marauders has acquired further acclaim from within the hip-hop community for its production, chemistry and influence, with some regarding it as the group's best work, one of the greatest albums of the decade, and one of the greatest hip-hop albums of all time. Several writers have credited it as a contributor to a "second golden age" of hip-hop in the mid-1990s, as well as the pinnacle of the Native Tongues movement. In 2020, it was ranked at number 201 on Rolling Stone's list of the 500 Greatest Albums of All Time.

== Recording ==
A Tribe Called Quest sought to further develop the bass-heavy sound of its previous album, The Low End Theory, with group member Q-Tip setting up his production equipment in the house basement of fellow member Phife Dawg's grandmother. Phife Dawg explained, "my grandmother gave him a key, the whole nine, he used to just go in and do his thing." Most of the album was planned in the basement, though Q-Tip also worked on outside projects there, including the beat for Nas's single "One Love", which appeared on his debut album Illmatic (1994). Rapper and producer Large Professor recalled the inviting, relaxed atmosphere in the basement: "[Phife Dawg] would just be there chilling, watching a basketball game or something, playing a video game and just listening to the beats, like, 'Yeah, yeah, I like that right there.' It was just so casual and cool ... just kind of sitting there and chillin' out, going to get something to eat, going through sounds and picking the sounds out. Telling a few jokes, watching some television like that; it was really nice. It wasn't forced in any way."

Phife Dawg recalled the pressure that the group faced to make a solid follow-up to The Low End Theory: "Obviously, that's a two-year wait, so there was a lot of pressure like, 'Can they do it again?' Q-Tip is really hands on, Tip is a genius, so by the time he was finished sequencing the album, I was lookin' at him sayin, 'Yo, b, we did it again.'" The album's title, Midnight Marauders, originated from Q-Tip's lyrics in the song "Vibes and Stuff" from The Low End Theory, though it was later interpreted by group member Ali Shaheed Muhammad that "A Tribe Called Quest are like sound thieves looting for your ears."

Recording sessions for Midnight Marauders took place at Battery Studios, Platinum Island Studios and Scorcerer Sound in New York City, over a period of nine months, ending in September 1993. All songs were mixed at Battery Studios and mastered at The Hit Factory in New York City. Production was mainly handled by Q-Tip, with contributions from Skeff Anselm, Large Professor and Ali Shaheed Muhammad, who also contributed DJ scratching. Raphael Saadiq (credited as Raphael Wiggins) played bass guitar on the song "Midnight".

Despite Jarobi White leaving the group midway through recording The Low End Theory, the group maintained a "revolving door policy" with him, in which he would continue to attend recording sessions and supply the group with humor that became part of their songwriting process. Clarifying his role, he stated, "You come in [to the studio]. You might have had a bad day today. Some lady might have pushed you on the train ... I walk in the studio and I'm bringing all my rambunctious silly stupid jokes and now we're all laughing."

== Music ==
=== Production ===
The production on Midnight Marauders is a return to the eclectic sampling that the group was originally known for, featuring samples of mainly 1970s jazz, funk, soul and R&B. The sound is noticeably grittier and funkier than The Low End Theory, with John Bush of AllMusic noting that the group "moved closer to their harder contemporaries" and praising them for producing "the most inviting grooves heard on any early-'90s rap record." The album has been described as "hooky" and was given critical praise for its frequent horn hooks. Q-Tip implemented his drum layering technique to great effect on the album, varying the drum frequencies on each song. Describing the album's drum programming to Vibe, Q-Tip said:

These are some epic drum sounds that will tear your fucking head off. And there are ways you can get that sound on different levels too. The drums don't always have to be super loud. When you listen to 'Electric Relaxation' the drums are not trying to kill you. It's [very much] controlled. But even if it's a smaller sounding beat you want the tone to be like at any moment the tone of these drums can go from 5 to 10! That's the whole vibe of Tribe's drum sound I was trying to go for.

Q-Tip also experimented with vocal sampling techniques on the album. For the song "Lyrics to Go", he sampled a portion of "Inside My Love" by Minnie Riperton, in which Riperton's whistle register is sustained throughout, giving "Lyrics to Go" a droning backdrop. The song "Sucka Nigga" contains a slowed-down sample of Rodney Cee's voice, taken from "M.C. Battle" with Busy Bee, which was featured in the old-school hip-hop film Wild Style (1983).

While DJing at a party, Q-Tip played Jade's hit "Don't Walk Away"; noting the positive crowd reaction when the song's bassline began playing, he was inspired to sample the bassline for the album's lead single, "Award Tour". For The Low End Theory, engineer Bob Power removed all excess noise from the samples, however, Q-Tip instructed him to leave the noise in the samples on Midnight Marauders, adding to the gritty nature of the album. In addition, Q-Tip has stated that the album has more "sheen" to it than The Low End Theory, having been recorded on an SSL mixing console rather than the Neve console they previously used.

=== Lyrics ===
The lyricism on Midnight Marauders is often regarded as the best on any A Tribe Called Quest album, and the group's biggest improvement since their debut People's Instinctive Travels and the Paths of Rhythm. The group's documentary director Michael Rapaport stated, "They followed a classic and upped the ante. Put it like this: [The Low End Theory] would be the first run at the championship ring, but it takes a different mentality to stay focused and do it again." Subject matter on the album includes social issues, use of the word nigger and everyday life, as well as several sports references. Building on the lyrical interplay that was established on The Low End Theory, Q-Tip and Phife Dawg are "practically telepathic" on some songs, providing a contrast in both delivery and style. AllMusic's John Bush described this contrast as "focused yet funky" and "polished but raw."

All aspects of the group's lyricism improved on the album, including cadence, flow, diction and use of metaphors. The song "8 Million Stories" finds Phife Dawg storytelling, as he details "a laundry-list of mundane annoyances." On the single "Oh My God", he refers to himself as a "funky diabetic" in a moment of self-deprecation. Throughout the album, the group blends their brand of intelligence, reflection, and positivity with humorous anecdotes. James Bernard of Entertainment Weekly praised the group for managing to "hold our attention without resorting to gun references or expletives."

Tom Breihan of Stereogum noted that Q-Tip and Phife Dawg "sounded slicker and more comfortable than they ever had before." Owing to that comfort and their chemistry, the two occasionally performed each other's lyrics during the recording sessions. Describing the "Electric Relaxation" session to XXL, Phife Dawg said, "On that record, [Q-Tip] wrote my lines and I wrote his—actually, we wrote our own lines, and when we recorded, we traded. That's why the whole back and forth, you know what I mean?"

== Cover artwork ==
The back vinyl cover of Midnight Marauders

The album cover artwork depicts a woman painted in Afrocentric colors, continuing the artistic theme found on The Low End Theory. According to Ego Trip's Book of Rap Lists, there are a reported 71 different hip-hop luminaries and radio DJs who adorned Midnight Marauders. Andrew Noz of Complex called it one of hip-hop's "last grand displays of cultural unity as the Coastal fallout loomed imminent." The book goes into detail as to which artists were on which particular album cover using a number scheme to easily identify each artist. The complete list of artists is as follows: 3rd Bass, Afrika Bambaataa, AMG, Ant Banks, Beastie Boys, Awesome Two, Black Moon, Busta Rhymes, Casual, Chi-Ali, Chubb Rock, Chuck D, The Cold Crush Brothers, Daddy-O of Stetsasonic, Dallas Austin, Del the Funky Homosapien, Diamond D, De La Soul, Doctor Dré, Doug E. Fresh, Fab Five Freddy, Grandmaster Dee of Whodini, Grandmaster Flash, Heavy D, Ice-T, Jazzy Jay, DJ Jazzy Joyce, Jungle Brothers, Kid Capri, Kool DJ Red Alert, Kool Moe Dee, Large Professor, Litro, Lords of the Underground, MC Lyte, Neek the Exotic, Organized Konfusion, The Pharcyde, Rashad Smith, Rock Steady Crew (Crazy Legs, Mr. Wiggles, Pee Wee Dance and Ruel), DJ Ron G, DJ Silver D, Sean Combs, Skeff Anselm, Souls of Mischief, Special Ed, Sweet Tee, Too Short and Zulu Nation Supreme Council.

== Commercial performance ==
Midnight Marauders peaked at number eight on the Billboard 200 and number one on the Top R&B/Hip-Hop Albums chart. Two of its singles, "Award Tour" and "Electric Relaxation", charted on the Billboard Hot 100, peaking at number 47 and 65, respectively.

On January 14, 1994, the album was certified gold by the Recording Industry Association of America (RIAA), with shipments of 500,000 copies in the United States. It was certified platinum by the RIAA nearly a full year later, on January 11, 1995, with shipments of one million copies. It became the first of three A Tribe Called Quest albums to be certified platinum by the RIAA, doing so 21 days before The Low End Theory achieved the feat.

== Critical reception ==
Contemporary professional reviews
Review scores
Source	Rating
Calgary Herald	C
Chicago Sun-Times	4/4 stars
Entertainment Weekly	A
NME	7/10
Q	4/5 stars
Rolling Stone	2/5 stars
Select	4/5 medals
The Source	4/5 stars
Spin	1/1 star
USA Today	3/4 stars

Midnight Marauders was generally well received by music critics, with Vibe hailing it as "a rap classic" and NME calling it the group's "most complete work to date." James Bernard of Entertainment Weekly stated that the album "sounds as fresh" as People's Instinctive Travels, praising its "smooth-as-butter" production and "whimsical vibe." The Source's dream hampton credited the group for doing "what they've always done—ignore all of the current trends in hip-hop and deliver a solid collectable", adding that they "rely solely on their street poetry, Zulu delivery and be-bop beats" to attract consumers.

Spin's Colson Whitehead praised Q-Tip and Phife Dawg for "complementing each other's styles perfectly", finding that their lyrical interplay "evokes the spontaneity of an improv jam session", and also lauded the album's "smooth textures that bubble up from unseen, mellow depths." In his consumer guide for The Village Voice, Robert Christgau quipped that it was "intelligent easy-listening rap", choosing the track "Steve Biko (Stir It Up)" as a highlight; he later commended the album, rating it higher than The Low End Theory. In a negative review, Glenn Kenny of Rolling Stone felt that the "lively wit" of the group's previous work had been "replaced with tired boasts", also stating, "The music still has its beguiling moments, but nothing approaches the revelatory jazz stylings and laid-back cool of past work."

=== Retrospect ===
John Bush of AllMusic praised the album for being "impeccably produced", "artistically adept," and "lyrically inventive." Bush also stated that it cemented the group's status as "alternative rap's prime sound merchants" and hailed them as "authors of the most original style since the Bomb Squad first exploded on wax." Stereo Williams of The Daily Beast credited the album's "jazzy boom bap" with exerting a "lasting impact on the group's legacy—and on Black music of the next 30 years." In Oliver Wang's book Classic Material: The Hip-Hop Album Guide, writer Joseph Patel noted how the album helped unify hip-hop in the early 1990s:

Their new crew extended beyond the Native Tongues and included all of hip-hop—as shown by the faces depicted on the album's front and back covers—and Tribe was quickly becoming the one group who could negotiate both underground respect and aboveground fame. Midnight Marauders worked all the elements that constituted Tribe previously to utter perfection: storytelling; anthemic singles; sexually charged rhymes; innovative production; and an exploration of life experiences, emotion, sentiment, history, and heritage. As hip-hop began to change and stratify and develop into generations and geographies, Midnight Marauders could have been the last record that every single hip-hopper—whether from Queensbridge or Queensland, whether gangsta or wannabe poet—had in their collection.

Writing in The New Rolling Stone Album Guide, Mac Randall wrote that it "certainly doesn't skimp on the funk." For About.com's 10 Essential Hip-Hop Albums, where the album was ranked seventh, writer Henry Adaso declared, "No other album showcased this amalgamation of jazz, soul, and rap better." Steve Juon of RapReviews lauded its "unparalleled level" of "lyrical brilliance by both Tip and Phife." It was ranked number 75 on Pitchfork's list of the Top 100 Favorite Records of the 1990s, with Rollie Pemberton stating that the group "produced a jazz-hop clinic that finds itself equal parts Pete Rock, Buckshot and Diamond D."

=== Accolades ===
Publication	Country	Accolade	Year	Rank
About.com	U.S.	100 Best Rap Albums of All Time	2008	26
About.com	U.S.	10 Essential Hip-Hop Albums	2008	7
About.com	U.S.	Best Rap Albums of 1993	2008	2
Ego Trip	U.S.	Hip Hop's 25 Greatest Albums by Year 1980–1998	1999	2
Exclaim!	Canada	100 Records That Rocked 100 Issues	2016	*
Gary Mulholland	UK	261 Greatest Albums Since Punk and Disco	2007	*
The Guardian	UK	1000 Albums to Hear Before You Die	2007	*
The Guardian	UK	Alternative Top 100	1999	98
No Ripcord	UK	Top Albums 1990–1999	2013	68
Pitchfork	U.S.	Top 100 Albums of the 1990s	2003	75
Popblerd/bLISTerd	U.S.	Top 100 Albums of the 1990s	2011	20
Porcys	Poland	The 100 Best Albums of the 1990s	2012	84
Rolling Stone	U.S.	The 500 Greatest Albums of All Time	2020	201
Slant Magazine	U.S.	The 100 Best Albums of the 1990s	2011	42
The Source	U.S.	The 100 Best Rap Albums of All Time	1998	*
Spin	U.S.	The 300 Best Albums of the Past 30 Years (1985-2014)	2015	84
Treble	U.S.	Top 100 Albums of the 90s (10 Per Year)	2008	10
Vibe	U.S.	150 Albums That Define the Vibe Era (1992–2007)	2007	*
Vibe	U.S.	The 50 Greatest Albums Since '93	2013	21
(*) designates lists which are unordered.

== Legacy and influence ==
Retrospective professional reviews
Review scores
Source	Rating
AllMusic	5/5 stars
Christgau's Consumer Guide	A−
The Encyclopedia of Popular Music	4/5 stars
MusicHound R&B	4.5/5 stars
The Rolling Stone Album Guide	4.5/5 stars
Spin	4.5/5 stars
Tom Hull – on the Web	A−
XXL	5/5

Midnight Marauders helped establish a "second golden age" of hip-hop, and has been regarded as the pinnacle of the Native Tongues movement. Hip-hop critics and writers have cited it as the group's best album, despite it not being as acclaimed as The Low End Theory. Lauding it as the group's "masterwork", writer Joseph Patel stated, "It's hard to believe they could top The Low End Theory, but A Tribe Called Quest did so." Steve Juon of RapReviews.com called Midnight Marauders "the best album that Tribe ever made" and an "overlooked work of genius." In 2020, Rolling Stone added the album to its revised list of the 500 Greatest Albums of All Time, ranking it at number 201.

Q-Tip later contributed to the sound of hardcore hip-hop during the mid-1990s, producing artists such as Nas, Mobb Deep, Crooklyn Dodgers and Cypress Hill, yet retaining elements of the sound he created on Midnight Marauders. In NME, producer Mark Ronson said that the album "changed the sound of East Coast hip-hop, which before was very noisy and aggressive. But Midnight Marauders just had this sheen to it—it wasn't too cleaned-up or sanitised, the snares still had that amazing 'crack' to them, but it sounded like nothing you'd ever heard before. It changed everything."

They embraced me as an unofficial member after 'Scenario'. I would go to Battery Studios, where they were making the record, and chill. That's how I ended up on the track 'Oh My God'. When Q-Tip played the finished album to me, I just started crying.

— Busta Rhymes

In 2003, Pitchfork writer Rollie Pemberton stated that "a deep listen to this record unveils the sound that helped promote the current chilled vibe-oriented underground", citing the J Dilla-affiliated duo Frank n Dank, Madlib and 9th Wonder's former group Little Brother as examples. Other underground artists influenced by the album include Terrace Martin, Jean Grae, Currensy, RJD2, Oddisee, Hiatus Kaiyote and Karriem Riggins. In a 20th anniversary review of the album for XXL, rapper Talib Kweli gave it a perfect "XXL" rating and stated, "It established Tribe as a commercial, mainstream almost pop group, but it did it by being completely true to their rudiments, and it did it by finding the greatest jazz samples and making the most classic underground hip-hop they could make. They were so good at making underground hip-hop that it went pop."

The singer Bilal names it among his 25 favorite albums, explaining that, "It's just a special album to me. I like where they were as far as beat making. I think it changed a lot in hip-hop on that record."

== Track listing ==
- All songs produced by A Tribe Called Quest, except track 4 produced by Skeff Anselm and track 11 produced by Large Professor.

No.	Title	Writer(s)	Length
1.	"Midnight Marauders Tour Guide"	Jonathan Davis; Ali Shaheed Muhammad; Malik Taylor	0:45
2.	"Steve Biko (Stir It Up)"	Davis; Muhammad; Taylor	3:11
3.	"Award Tour" (featuring Trugoy the Dove)	Davis; Muhammad; Taylor	3:46
4.	"8 Million Stories"	Davis; Muhammad; Taylor; Skeff Anselm	4:30
5.	"Sucka Nigga"	Davis; Muhammad; Taylor; Freddie Hubbard	4:05
6.	"Midnight" (featuring Raphael Wiggins)	Davis; Muhammad; Taylor	3:49
7.	"We Can Get Down"	Davis; Muhammad; Taylor	4:19
8.	"Electric Relaxation"	Davis; Muhammad; Taylor	4:04
9.	"Clap Your Hands"	Davis; Muhammad; Taylor; Bob James; Leo Nocentelli; George Porter Jr.; Cyril Neville; Joseph Modeliste	3:16
10.	"Oh My God" (featuring Busta Rhymes)	Davis; Muhammad; Taylor	3:29
11.	"Keep It Rollin'" (featuring Large Professor)	Davis; Muhammad; Taylor; William Mitchell	3:05
12.	"The Chase, Part II"	Davis; Muhammad; Taylor; Steve Arrington; Victor Godsey; Buddy Hankerson	4:02
13.	"Lyrics to Go"	Davis; Muhammad; Taylor	4:09
14.	"God Lives Through"	Davis; Muhammad; Taylor	4:15
Total length:			51:12

== Personnel ==
Credits are adapted from AllMusic.

- Skeff Anselm – producer
- Busta Rhymes – guest artist
- Pete Christensen – assistant engineer
- Tom Coyne – mastering
- Patrick Derivaz – assistant engineer
- Chris Flam – assistant engineer
- Eric Gast – assistant engineer
- Gerard Julien – assistant engineer
- Large Professor – guest artist, producer
- Tim Latham – engineer
- Hoover Le – assistant engineer
- Ali Shaheed Muhammad – DJ
- Phife Dawg – vocals
- Bob Power – engineer, mixing
- Q-Tip – vocals
- Brad Schmidt – assistant engineer
- George Spatta – assistant engineer
- A Tribe Called Quest – engineer, mixing, primary artist, producer
- Trugoy the Dove – guest artist
- Carol Weinberg – photography
- Raphael Wiggins – guest artist, bass guitar

== Charts and certifications ==
=== Weekly charts ===
Chart (1993)	Peak position
Australian Albums (ARIA)	181
Canada Top Albums/CDs (RPM)	48
UK Albums (Official Charts)	70
US Billboard 200	8
US Top R&B/Hip-Hop Albums (Billboard)	1

Chart (2026)	Peak position
Belgian Albums (Ultratop Flanders)	112
Greek Albums (IFPI)	7

=== Year-end charts ===
Chart (1994)	Position
US Top R&B/Hip-Hop Albums (Billboard)	24

=== Certifications ===
Region	Certification	Certified units/sales
United Kingdom (BPI)	Silver	60,000^{‡}
United States (RIAA)	Platinum	1,000,000^{^}
^{^} Shipments figures based on certification alone.^{‡} Sales+streaming figures based on certification alone.

== See also ==
- List of number-one R&B albums of 1993 (U.S.)
- List of 1990s albums considered the best
- Progressive rap

== Bibliography ==
- Jenkins, Sacha; Wilson, Elliott (December 3, 1999). Jenkins, Sacha (ed.). Ego Trip's Book of Rap Lists. Macmillan. ISBN 0-312-24298-0.
- Wang, Oliver (2003). Classic Material: The Hip-Hop Album Guide. ECW Press. ISBN 1-55022-561-8.
- Larkin, Colin, ed. (2002). The Encyclopedia of Popular Music (4th ed.). Muze UK. ISBN 1-85227-923-0.
