= Yvonne Fair =

American singer

Background information
- Born: Flora Yvonne Coleman; October 21, 1942; Richmond, Virginia, U.S.
- Died: March 6, 1994 (aged 51) Las Vegas, Nevada, U.S.
- Genres: Soul; funk
- Occupation: Singer
- Years active: 1960–1994
- Labels: King; Smash; Dade; Soul; Motown

Flora Yvonne Fair Strain (née Coleman; October 21, 1942 – March 6, 1994) was an American singer, best known for her 1975 recording of "It Should Have Been Me".

== Life and career ==
Flora Yvonne Coleman was born in Richmond, Virginia on October 12, 1942. She dropped out of high school in the eleventh grade to marry Leroy Fair, and gave birth to their son shortly after. At the recommendation of her husband, she joined the Chantels and then the James Brown Revue in 1961. While performing with Brown, she recorded a few singles for King Records, including "I Found You", which he later re-worked into his own signature hit "I Got You (I Feel Good)".

She later linked up with Chuck Jackson who took her to Motown Records. Fair had a small part as a singer in the Motown produced film Lady Sings the Blues (1972). While on Motown, she was the opening act for the Temptations, the Jackson 5, Marvin Gaye, and Stevie Wonder. Fair worked with producer Norman Whitfield on a series of singles: "Love Ain't No Toy", "Walk Out the Door If You Wanna", and her cover version of "Funky Music Sho' 'Nuff Turns Me On". All these featured on her only album in 1975 titled The Bitch Is Black, which was re-released on CD for the first time more than 30 years later.

Her cover of "It Should Have Been Me" reached the low end of the Billboard Hot 100 chart in 1976. The track proved a big hit in the UK, where it climbed to number 5 in February 1976, Fair's only UK hit record. In addition, the song featured in a special episode of BBC TV programme The Vicar of Dibley, entitled "The Handsome Stranger", originally broadcast on 25 December 2006.

By the 1980s, Fair had retired from recording and would occasionally perform in small clubs and bars around Los Angeles. She worked as Dionne Warwick's wardrobe coordinator.

In 1991, Fair appeared on a TV movie called Mr. Roadrunner, starring Jools Holland and Stephen Fry, lip-synching her signature song, "It Should Have Been Me".

Fair died at the age of 51, from pancreatic cancer in Las Vegas, Nevada, on March 6, 1994.

== Personal life ==
Fair was married to Leroy Fair and later to Sammy Strain, who was a member of both Little Anthony and the Imperials and the O'Jays. Strain is one of the few artists in music history that is a double Rock and Roll Hall of Fame Inductee, having been inducted with the O'Jays in 2005, and the Imperials in 2009.

Fair had two children: Leroy Fair Jr. with her husband Leroy Fair and Venisha Brown with James Brown. Her daughter Venisha Brown struggled with drug addiction and was arrested multiple times; she died from complications from pneumonia at the age of 53 in 2018.

== In popular culture ==
Fair was portrayed by Tika Sumpter in the 2014 James Brown biopic, Get on Up.

== Discography ==
=== Albums ===
Year	Album	Label	US R&B
1975	The Bitch Is Black	Motown	57

=== Singles ===
Year	Title	Peak chart positions			
Year	Title	US Pop	US R&B	AUS	UK
1962	"I Found You" (with the James Brown Band)	―	―	―	―
1962	"Tell Me Why" (with the James Brown Band)	―	―	―	―
1962	"It Hurts to Be in Love" (with the James Brown Band)	―	―	―	―
1963	"Say Yeah Yeah"	―	―	―	―
1966	"Baby, Baby, Baby"	―	―	―	―
1970	"Stay a Little Longer"	―	―	―	―
1970	"We Should Never Be Lonely My Love"	―	―	―	―
1974	"Funky Music Sho' 'Nuff Turns Me On"	―	32	―	―
1974	"Walk Out the Door If You Wanna"	―	60	―	―
1975	"Love Ain't No Toy"	―	96	―	―
1975	"It's Bad for Me to See You"	―	―	―	―
1975	"You Can't Judge a Book by Its Cover"	―	―	―	―
1975	"It Should Have Been Me"	85	―	10	5
"—" denotes releases that did not chart or were not released in that territory.

=== As a background singer ===
- 1978: Patti LaBelle – "You Are My Friend" b/w "I Think About You" (Epic 8–50487)
- 1980: The Commodores – "Jesus Is Love" (Motown)
