= Adeva =

American singer (born 1960)

- Also known as: Adeva
- Born: Patricia Daniels; December 13, 1960 (age 65); Paterson, New Jersey, U.S.
- Genres: Garage; house; R&B
- Occupation: Teacher: 2015–present Singer: 1988–2004
- Instrument: Vocals
- Years active: 1988–present
- Labels: Cooltempo/Chrysalis/EMI (UK); Capitol/EMI (U.S.); Parlophone/WEA (2013–present)

Adeva (born Patricia Daniels, born December 13, 1960) is an American singer. She had a string of successful house and R&B hits in the late 1980s to early 1990s, including "Warning!", "I Thank You" and "Respect" (all three of which reached number 17 in the UK Singles Chart).

== Early life ==
Born in 1960 in Paterson, New Jersey, Daniels was the youngest of six children. She developed her voice as a member, and later director and vocal coach, of her church choir. She began singing professionally in the mid-1980s, releasing the single "In and Out of My Life" in 1988 on Easy Street Records.

== Debut album ==
Immediately after this, she signed with the UK label Cooltempo (a subsidiary of EMI) later in 1988 and released a house reworking of the Aretha Franklin hit "Respect" that reached No. 17 in the UK. Her debut album, Adeva!, was released in August 1989, and peaked at No. 6 on the UK Albums Chart, No. 28 in Germany, and No. 14 in Australia. The album was certified platinum by the British Phonographic Industry for UK sales exceeding 300,000 copies. In addition to "Respect", the album contained several other hit singles including "Warning!" and "I Thank You", both of which also reached No. 17 in the UK, becoming part of a trio of similarly placed hit records, and "Musical Freedom" which reached No. 22. The album was released in the United States in 1990 via EMI's Capitol Records, where "Warning!" had become a top 10 Billboard Dance Chart hit.

== Later career ==
Her second album, 1991's Love or Lust, failed to chart in both the UK and US, despite featuring two hit singles on the US Dance chart, "Independent Woman" (US Dance No. 7) and "It Should Have Been Me" (US Dance No. 1), and she was dropped by Cooltempo in 1992.

Adeva collaborated with house music pioneer Frankie Knuckles in 1995, with whom she released two UK top 40 singles and an album, Welcome to the Real World.

In 1997, Adeva released another album, New Direction, on Distinctive Records, but it was unsuccessful. It was her last album to date, although she was featured on various singles in 2003–04 with other artists, including Radical Noiz and Eric Prydz, who both sampled Adeva's 1988 single "In and out of My Life", which was also sampled by OnePhatDeeva in 1999. She was also featured on the 2004 single "Wish I Never Knew" by the Scandinavian dance act Slippery People.

== Discography ==
=== Studio albums ===
| Title | Album details | Peak chart positions | | | | Certifications |
| Title | Album details | UK | AUS | EU | GER | Certifications |
|---|---|---|---|---|---|---|
| Adeva! | Released: 1989; Label: Cooltempo/Chrysalis/EMI | 6 | 14 | 28 | 28 | BPI: Platinum |
| Love or Lust | Released: 1991; Label: Cooltempo/Chrysalis | — | 114 | — | — | |
| Welcome to the Real World (with Frankie Knuckles) | Released: 1995; Label: Virgin | — | — | — | — | |
| New Direction | Released: 1997; Label: Distinct'ive/Avex Trax | — | — | — | — | |
"—" denotes releases that did not chart or were not released in that territory.

=== Compilation albums ===
| Title | Album details | Peak chart positions |
| Title | Album details | AUS |
|---|---|---|
| Hits! | Released: 1992 | 251 |
| Ultimate Adeva | Released: 1996 | — |

=== Singles ===
| Year | Single | Peak positions | | | | | | | | | | | Album |
| Year | Single | UK | AUS | BEL (FLA) | FRA | GER | IRE | NED | NZ | SWI | US Dance | US R&B | Album |
|---|---|---|---|---|---|---|---|---|---|---|---|---|---|
| 1988 | "In and Out of My Life" | — | — | — | — | — | — | — | — | — | — | — | Adeva! |
| 1988 | "Respect" | 17 | 150 | 34 | — | — | 17 | 21 | — | — | 21 | 84 | Adeva! |
| 1989 | "Musical Freedom (Free at Last)" (with Paul Simpson) | 22 | 151 | — | — | — | 26 | 43 | — | — | — | — | Adeva! |
| 1989 | "Warning!" | 17 | 38 | — | — | — | — | 46 | 18 | — | 4 | — | Adeva! |
| 1989 | "I Thank You" | 17 | 30 | — | 50 | 38 | 19 | 40 | 46 | — | — | — | Adeva! |
| 1989 | "Beautiful Love" | 57 | 109 | — | — | — | — | — | — | — | — | — | Adeva! |
| 1990 | "Treat Me Right" | 62 | — | — | — | — | — | — | — | — | — | — | Adeva! |
| 1991 | "Ring My Bell" (Vs. Monie Love) | 20 | 35 | 44 | — | 25 | — | 15 | 13 | 8 | — | — | Love or Lust? |
| 1991 | "It Should've Been Me" | 48 | 83 | — | — | — | — | — | — | — | 1 | — | Love or Lust? |
| 1992 | "Don't Let It Show on Your Face" | 34 | 187 | — | — | — | — | — | — | — | — | — | Love or Lust? |
| 1992 | "Independent Woman" (US only) | — | — | — | — | — | — | — | — | — | 7 | — | Love or Lust? |
| 1992 | "Until You Come Back to Me" | 45 | — | — | — | — | — | — | — | — | — | — | Love or Lust? |
| 1992 | "I'm the One for You" | 51 | — | — | — | — | — | — | — | — | — | — | Love or Lust? |
| 1993 | "Respect '93" | 65 | — | — | — | — | — | — | — | — | — | — | Single only |
| 1996 | "I Thank You '96" | 37 | — | — | — | — | — | — | — | — | — | — | Ultimate Adeva |
| 1997 | "Where Is the Love? / The Way That You Feel" | 54 | — | — | — | — | — | — | — | — | — | — | New Direction |
| 1997 | "Don't Think About It" | 78 | — | — | — | — | — | — | — | — | — | — | New Direction |
| 1998 | "Been Around" (GER only) | — | — | — | — | — | — | — | — | — | — | — | New Direction |
"—" denotes releases that did not chart or were not released.

=== Collaborations ===
| Year | Single | Peak positions | | | Album |
| Year | Single | UK | US Dance | AUS | Album |
|---|---|---|---|---|---|
| 1995 | "Too Many Fish" (Frankie Knuckles featuring Adeva) | 34 | 1 | 110 | Welcome To The Real World (Frankie Knuckles featuring Adeva) |
| 1995 | "Whadda U Want (From Me)" (Frankie Knuckles featuring Adeva) | 36 | 3 | — | Welcome To The Real World (Frankie Knuckles featuring Adeva) |
| 1995 | "Walkin'" (Frankie Knuckles featuring Adeva) | — | 5 | — | Welcome To The Real World (Frankie Knuckles featuring Adeva) |
| 1996 | "Do Watcha Do" (Hyper Go Go & Adeva) | 54 | — | — | National Anthems (Hyper Go Go) |
| 1997 | "Do Watcha Do (Remix)" (Hyper Go Go & Adeva) | 60 | — | — | Singles only |
| 2003 | "In & Out" (Radikal Noiz featuring Adeva) | 96 | — | — | Singles only |
| 2004 | "Wish I Never Knew" (Slippery People featuring Adeva) | — | — | — | Singles only |
"—" denotes releases that did not chart or were not released.

=== Videos ===
- 1991 Live at the Town and Country Club, Chrysalis/EMI Video (UK)
- 1992 The Video Hits!

== See also ==
- List of Billboard number-one dance club songs
- List of artists who reached number one on the U.S. Dance Club Songs chart
