= J Beez wit the Remedy =

J. Beez Wit the Remedy

Studio album by Jungle Brothers
- Released: June 22, 1993
- Recorded: 1992–1993
- Genres: Alternative rap; jazz rap
- Length: 50:20
- Label: Warner Bros.
- Producers: Jungle Brothers; Robert Power

Jungle Brothers chronology
Done By the Forces of Nature (1989)	J. Beez Wit the Remedy (1993)	Raw Deluxe (1997)

Singles from J. Beez Wit the Remedy
- 1. "40 Below Trooper" Released: May 1993; 2. "On the Road Again (My Jimmy Weighs a Ton)" Released: October 1993

J. Beez Wit the Remedy is the third album by the Jungle Brothers, released in 1993 on Warner Bros. Records.

== Background ==
The album was the result of much label trouble, with Warner Bros. consistently rejecting the group's offerings. It was originally titled Crazy Wisdom Masters, and contained some experimental hip-hop for the time, as well as production from Bill Laswell. Though the final album is more conventional, experimental tracks remain, including a few from the Crazy Wisdom Masters sessions (e.g. "Spittin' Wicked Randomness", "For the Headz at Company Z"). Tracks from the Wisdom sessions were released in 1999.

== Critical reception ==
Professional ratings
Review scores
Source	Rating
AllMusic	3/5 stars
Calgary Herald	B
Chicago Tribune	2.5/4 stars
Robert Christgau	B+
The Encyclopedia of Popular Music	2/5 stars
Entertainment Weekly	C
Hip Hop Connection	5/5 stars
MusicHound R&B: The Essential Album Guide	2/5 stars
Rolling Stone	4/5 stars
Spin Alternative Record Guide	9/10

The Virginian-Pilot thought that "the super-stompin' '40 Below Trooper' and 'I'm in Love With Indica' are some of the most exciting music of the summer, and raise the inventiveness quotient of this vivid, good-humored rap set several notches." The Guardian deemed the album the definitive example of "out rap," writing that the "scorched, gnarled noise, non-aligned beats and furiously choked vocals are nicely summed up in the song title 'Spittin Wicked Randomness'."

Trouser Press wrote that "with its harder and more aggressive sound, the album simply doesn’t have the creative spark or infectiously happy-go-lucky vibe that distinguished Done by the Forces of Nature." MTV called J Beez wit the Remedy "the clangiest, most disjointed hip-hop affair ever recorded." The Spin Alternative Record Guide wrote: "Throwing it all away with a haphazardness that reveals the likes of Onyx as the sitcom puppets they are, the Jungle Brothers are back reinventing hip hop."

== Track listing ==
1. "40 Below Trooper" – 3:57
2. "Book of Rhyme Pages" – 4:44
3. "My Jimmy Weighs a Ton" – 3:37
4. "Good Ole Hype Sh.." – 3:31
5. "Blahbludify" – 2:33
6. "Spark a New Flame" – 4:24
7. "I'm in Love with Indica" – 4:14
8. "Simple as That" – 3:53
9. "All I Think About Is You" – 4:08
10. "Good Lookin Out" – 3:31
11. "JB's Comin Through" – 1:57
12. "Spittin Wicked Randomness" – 3:32
13. "For the Headz at Company Z" – 3:08
14. "Manmade Material" – 3:11

== Personnel ==
- Jungle Brothers – design, reproduction
- Robert Power – executive producer, mixing
- Doug DeAngelis – engineer
- Oz Fritz – engineer
- Deborah Norcross – design
- Enrique Badulescu – photography
- Jeff Gold – art direction
- Nancy Ogami – typography

== Singles ==
Year	Track	Chart	Peak
1993	"40 Below Trooper"	Billboard Hot Rap Singles	2
1993	"On the Road Again (My Jimmy Weighs a Ton)"		
