= Award Tour =

Single by A Tribe Called Quest featuring Trugoy

from the album Midnight Marauders
- B-side: "The Chase, Part II"
- Released: October 19, 1993
- Recorded: 1993
- Genre: Jazz rap
- Length: 3:46
- Label: Jive
- Songwriters: Kamaal Fareed; Weldon Irvine; Malik Taylor; Ali Muhammad
- Producer: A Tribe Called Quest

A Tribe Called Quest singles chronology
"Hot Sex" (1992)	"Award Tour" (1993)	"Electric Relaxation" (1994)

Music video
- "Award Tour" on YouTube

Award Tour
From the Tribe's 3rd album Midnight Marauders.

"Award Tour" is a song by American hip-hop group A Tribe Called Quest, released in October 1993 by Jive Records as the first single from their third album, Midnight Marauders (1993). The song features rapper Trugoy on the chorus, from the fellow Native Tongues group De La Soul. It contains a sample of "We Gettin' Down" by Weldon Irvine, from his 1975 album Spirit Man. The B-side of the single is the original version of the Midnight Marauders track "The Chase, Pt. 2", which notably features the first known verse by future Tribe collaborator Consequence. "Award Tour" remains Tribe's highest charting single to date on the US Billboard Hot 100, peaking at number 47. It also peaked at number 54 on the Cash Box Top 100 as well as topping the Billboard Dance Singles chart.

The second half of the song's chorus calls out names of cities and states in this order: New York City, New Jersey, North Carolina, Virginia, Oakland, Los Angeles, San Francisco, St. John, Chi-town, Spokane, London, Tokyo, Houston, Delaware, Washington, D.C., Dallas, South Carolina, Maryland, New Orleans, and Detroit. Additionally, one line in the second verse mentions two Major League Baseball teams, the Atlanta Braves and New York Yankees.

== Background ==
Speaking with Vibe, Q-Tip revealed his process for the song's production:

I love the drums on 'Award Tour.' And then there's the sample I used from Jade's 'Don't Walk Away.' It's all about that bassline. I just wanted to flip it, so I went through some more records and I got that Rhodes to counter the melody in the bassline. I wanted some drums that would smack that shit out the park.

== Music video ==
The accompanying music video for "Award Tour" was released in November 1993 and features an appearance by De La Soul. It was filmed within the borders of a painting and features Q-Tip and Phife Dawg rapping in New York City while De La Soul member Trugoy sings the chorus. The video was nominated for Clip of the Year in the category for Rap at the 1994 Billboard Music Video Awards.

== Charts ==
Chart (1994)	Peak position
US Billboard Hot 100	47
US Dance Club Songs (Billboard)	27
US Dance Singles Sales (Billboard)	1
US Hot R&B/Hip-Hop Songs (Billboard)	27
US Hot Rap Songs (Billboard)	7
US Cash Box Top 100	54
