= It Should Have Been Me (Norman Whitfield song) =

1968 song performed by Gladys Knight & the Pips

"It Should Have Been Me" is a 1963 song written by William "Mickey" Stevenson and Norman Whitfield for Kim Weston. It has been performed by Yvonne Fair, Gladys Knight & the Pips and Adeva among others. Knight's version peaked at number 40 on the Billboard Hot 100 in 1968 and number 33 in Canada. Fair had her only hit single with her recording of the song in 1976, reaching number 5 in the UK, number 85 in the US and number 10 in Australia.

The song begins:

"I saw my love walking down the aisle
And as he passed me by, he turned to me and gave me a smile"

== Versions ==
=== Kim Weston (1963) ===
- Lead vocals by Kim Weston
- Backing vocals by The Supremes: Florence Ballard, Diana Ross, and Mary Wilson
- Instrumentation by The Funk Brothers

=== Gladys Knight & The Pips (1968) ===
- Lead vocals by Gladys Knight
- Backing vocals by Merald "Bubba" Knight, Edward Patten, and William Guest
- Instrumentation by The Funk Brothers and the Detroit Symphony Orchestra

=== Yvonne Fair (1975) ===
- Lead vocals by Yvonne Fair
- Instrumentation by The Funk Brothers

This version was used in The Vicar of Dibley 2006 episode "The Handsome Stranger", with Dawn French miming the singing.

=== Adeva (1991) ===
"It Should Have Been Me"

Single by Adeva

from the album Love & Lust
- Released: 1991
- Genre: Disco; garage; house
- Length: 3:22
- Label: Capitol Records
- Songwriters: William "Mickey" Stevenson and Norman Whitfield
- Producer: Smack

Adeva singles chronology
"Ring My Bell" (1991)	"It Should Have Been Me" (1991)	"Don't Let It Show on Your Face" (1992)

Music video
- "It Should Have Been Me" on YouTube

In 1991, American dance music artist Adeva had the first of two number ones on the US Billboard Hot Dance Club Play chart with her version of "It Should Have Been Me". The song was produced by Smack and released by Capitol Records as the second single from her second album, Love & Lust (1991). In Europe, it peaked at number 48 on the UK Singles Chart, number four on the European Dance Radio Chart and number one on the UK Club Chart.

==== Critical reception ====
The song received favorable reviews from music critics. Alex Henderson from AllMusic stated that Adeva interprets the Gladys Knight & the Pips hit "with equally impressive results." Larry Flick from Billboard magazine wrote, "Dance chanteuse previews her sophomore effort, Love & Lust, with an attitudinal houser. Highly stylized, assertive vocals are countered by a physical bass line and a rousing gospel-spiced undercurrent. Demands immediate club approval—not to mention attention at crossover and urban radio." Andrew Smith from Melody Maker complimented it as a "joyously stomping" disco/garage tune, "well worth the price of a 45." Ian McCann from NME wrote, "There's an epic cover of an old soul hit: instead of 'Respect', this time Yvonne Fair's terrible 'It Should've Been Me' gets the treatment, and what a treatment it is: Adeva slits open the tune and takes all the mawkishness out of it. Given a cooler mix it should—ironically—be a massive Italian-styled hit."

==== Track listing ====
- Vinyl, Europe (1991)

A: "It Should've Been Me" — 3:22
AA: "It Should've Been Me" (Touchdown Edit) — 4:18

- 12", UK (1991)

A: "It Should've Been Me" (Touchdown Mix) — 6:09
AA1: "It Should've Been Me" (Classic Club Mix) — 6:59
AA2: "It Should've Been Me" (Def Club Mix)

- CD single, US (1991)
1. "It Should Have Been Me" (Hype Radio Mix) — 4:08
2. "It Should Have Been Me" (Def Radio Mix) — 3:55
3. "It Should Have Been Me" (Extended Remix) — 6:30
4. "It Should Have Been Me" (Classic Club Mix) — 9:11
5. "It Should Have Been Me" (Def Club Mix) — 7:40
6. "It Should Have Been Me" (Def Zone Mental) — 6:35
7. "It Should Have Been Me" (Sound Factory Mix) — 5:08
8. "It Should Have Been Me" (LP Version) — 5:06

==== Charts ====
===== Weekly charts =====
Chart (1991)	Peak position
Australia (ARIA)	83
Europe (European Dance Radio)	4
UK Singles (Official Charts)	48
UK Airplay (Music Week)	59
UK Dance (Music Week)	8
UK Club Chart (Record Mirror)	1
US Hot Dance Club Songs (Billboard)	1

===== Year-end charts =====
Chart (1991)	Position
UK Club Chart (Record Mirror)	52

=== Miley Cyrus (2021) ===
- Lead vocals by Miley Cyrus.

== See also ==
- List of number-one dance singles of 1991 (U.S.)
