= Breathe (Don't Stop) =

Single by Mr. On VS The Jungle Brothers

from the album You in My Hut Now
- Released: 2004
- Recorded: 2003
- Genre: R&B
- Length: 3:32
- Label: XYZ

Mr. On VS The Jungle Brothers singles chronology
"What's the five 0" (2001)	"Breathe (Don't Stop)" (2004)

"Breathe (Don't Stop)" is a song released by Mr. On and the Jungle Brothers, from the Jungle Brothers' album You in My Hut Now. The song was not commercially successful, reaching number 33 on the Australian ARIA singles chart, and number 30 on the New Zealand RIANZ singles chart. "Breathe (Don't Stop)" also peaked at number 56 in the Netherlands.

It is based on samples from Michael Jackson's "Don't Stop 'til You Get Enough"

== Official versions ==
- "Breathe (Don't Stop)" (Album Version) – 3:32

== Track listing ==
No.	Title	Length
1.	"Breathe (Don't Stop)" (Radio Edit)	3:40
2.	"Breathe (Don't Stop)" (Extended Mix)	5:05
3.	"Breathe (Don't Stop)" (Milk & Sugar Remix)	7:30
4.	"Breathe (Don't Stop)" (Ali B's Plan B Remix)	6:24
5.	"Breathe (Don't Stop)" (Blakkat's Blackacid Vox)	7:03
6.	"Breathe (Don't Stop)" (Music Video)	3:34

== Charts ==
Chart performance for "Breathe (Don't Stop)"
Chart (2004)	Peak position
Australia (ARIA)	33
Hungary (Dance Top 40)	15
Ireland (IRMA)	26
Italy (FIMI)	32
Netherlands (Single Top 100)	56
New Zealand (Recorded Music NZ)	30
UK Singles (OCC)	21
