= Raw Deluxe =

Studio album by Jungle Brothers
- Released: June 3, 1997
- Recorded: 1996–1997
- Genre: Hip hop
- Length: 51:28
- Label: Gee Street

Jungle Brothers chronology
J Beez wit the Remedy (1993)	Raw Deluxe (1997)	V.I.P. (2000)

Professional ratings
Review scores
Source	Rating
AllMusic	3/5 stars
Chicago Tribune	2/4 stars
NME	7/10
Uncut	2/5 stars

Raw Deluxe is the fourth album by American hip hop group the Jungle Brothers. It was released on June 3, 1997, via Gee Street Records. Set to be distributed through Island/PolyGram, with which Gee Street had a distribution deal (a catalog number had been issued), this became the first Gee Street title to be distributed by V2/BMG after the label's purchase by Richard Branson.

== Track listing ==
1. "Jungle Brother (True Blue)" – 4:07
2. "Changes" – 3:50
3. "Black Man on Track" – 4:37
4. "Toe to Toe" – 3:58
5. "Moving Along" – 4:43
6. "Gettin Money" – 4:09
7. "Where You Wanna Go" – 3:16
8. "Brain" – 4:56
9. "Handle My Business" – 3:51
10. "How Ya Want It We Got It" (Native Tongues Remix) – 4:35
11. "Bring It On" – 4:21
12. "Jungle Brother" (Stereo MC's Mix) – 5:05

== Charts ==
Chart (1997-98)	Peak position
UK Albums (OCC)	94
UK Independent Albums (OCC)	19
UK R&B Albums (OCC)	16
US Heatseekers Albums (Billboard)	12
US Top R&B/Hip-Hop Albums (Billboard)	37
