= In a Word or 2 =

Studio album by Monie Love
- Released: 23 March 1993
- Recorded: 1992–1993
- Genres: Hip-hop; new jack swing
- Length: 50:27
- Labels: Warner Bros.; Cooltempo/Chrysalis/EMI
- Producers: Marley Marl; K-Def; Prince; Aaron "Freedom" Lyles; Steve "Silk" Hurley

Monie Love chronology
Down to Earth (1990)	In a Word or 2 (1993)

Singles from In a Word or 2
- 1. "Full Term Love" Released: 1992; 2. "Born 2 B.R.E.E.D." Released: 1993; 3. "In a Word or 2" Released: 1993; 4. "Never Give Up" Released: 1993

Professional ratings
Review scores
Source	Rating
AllMusic	3/5 stars
Chicago Tribune	3/4 stars
Robert Christgau	(dud)
The Encyclopedia of Popular Music	3/5 stars
Los Angeles Times	3/4 stars
Music Week	3/5 stars
NME	7/10
Orlando Sentinel	4/5 stars
Select	2/5 medals

In a Word or 2 is the second and final studio album by English rapper Monie Love. It was released on 23 March 1993 by Warner Bros. Records and was mostly produced by Marley Marl with his protege K-Def remixing two tracks. Prince co-wrote and co-produced the title track and "Born 2 B.R.E.E.D." Monie and producer Aaron "Freedom" Lyles produced the song "I'm a Believer", while producer/remixer Steve "Silk" Hurley was brought in for additional production and remix for the first single "Born to B.R.E.E.D."

Although In a Word or 2 did not chart on the UK Albums Chart or the US Billboard Top 200 albums chart, it reached No. 75 on the US Billboard Top R&B Albums chart and No. 36 on the US Top Heatseekers chart. Two singles charted in the US: "Full Term Love" peaked at No. 96 and "Born 2 B.R.E.E.D." reached No. 89 on the US Billboard Hot 100.

== Critical reception ==
Paul Moody of NME called In a Word or 2, "a fine pop record." Johnny Loftus of AllMusic wrote that "Love's musical voice and singsong delivery are still in effect, but her raps are decidedly more aggressive, lacking the playful air of her first record." The Encyclopedia of Popular Music called the album "another challenging and articulate set ... informed by Love's recent experience of motherhood."

Hiedi Siegmund of The Los Angeles Times with praise said, "A combination of substance and sass, Monie Love's second album is tougher and funkier than the pop-hop featured on 1990’s Down to Earth.” Trouser Press opined that "only 'There's a Better Way,' a cautionary story about HIV, hits the right mix of music and mind." Parry Gettleman of the Orlando Sentinel also commented "Three years after her bright debut, Down to Earth, London-born rapper Monie Love is back. None of the new tracks are quite as catchy as her Monie in the Middle or It's a Shame, but producer/co-writer Marley Marl provides her with plenty of highly danceable beats and throws in savvy, jazzy horn accents. Love still has plenty to say and her own sassy way of saying it."

== Track listing ==
1. "Wheel of Fortune" – 3:55
2. "Greasy" – 4:08
3. "Sex U All" – 5:03
4. "Mo' Monie" – 4:14
5. "I'm a Believer" – 3:43
6. "Let a Woman B a Woman" – 4:15
7. "Full Term Love" – 4:44
8. "Born 2 B.R.E.E.D." – 4:06
9. "In a Word or 2" – 3:36
10. "There's a Better Way" – 3:58
11. "4 da Children" – 4:26
12. "Born 2 B.R.E.E.D." (Hip-Hop Mix) – 4:12

== Charts ==
Chart (1993)	Peak position
Australian Albums (ARIA)	147
