= Oh My God (A Tribe Called Quest song) =

Single by A Tribe Called Quest featuring Busta Rhymes

from the album Midnight Marauders
- B-side: "Lyrics to Go"
- Released: May 30, 1994
- Recorded: 1993
- Genre: Alternative hip-hop
- Length: 3:30
- Label: Jive
- Songwriters: Kamaal Fareed; Malik Taylor; Ali Shaheed Muhammad; Robert Bell; Dennis Thomas; Ronald Bell; George Brown; Claydes Smith; Richard Westfield; Woodrow Sparrow; Robert Mickens; Gene Redd; Jymie Merritt
- Producer: A Tribe Called Quest

A Tribe Called Quest singles chronology
| "Electric Relaxation" (1994) | "Oh My God" (1994) | "1nce Again" (1996) |

Busta Rhymes singles chronology
| "Classic Material" (1994) | "Oh My God" (1994) | "Flava in Ya Ear (Remix)" (1994) |

Audio sample
- Oh My God: file; help

Music video
- "Oh My God" on YouTube

"Oh My God" is a song by American hip-hop group A Tribe Called Quest, released in May 1994, by Jive Records as the third single from their third album, Midnight Marauders (1993). The song contains a sample of "Who's Gonna Take the Weight" by Kool & the Gang and also features Busta Rhymes on the chorus.

== Critical reception ==
Upon the release, Larry Flick from Billboard magazine wrote, "The masters of the abstract return with a slick, stylistic jam. Jazzy horns slide against samples from Lee Morgan and Kool & the Gang, while a big beat combats the organized noise." James Hamilton from the Record Mirror Dance Update named it a "jaunty 'Oh my Gowd!' jiggled mutterer" in his weekly dance column. Rolling Stone magazine included "Oh My God" on their list of 20 essential A Tribe Called Quest songs, noting, "It's not easy to listen to Phife boast 'When's the last time you heard a funky diabetic?' now that the disease has taken his life. But that line also sounds fiercer and more defiant than ever."

== Music video ==
The music video for "Oh My God" begins in a convenience store where Q-Tip and Phife Dawg are buying snacks. When they get outside, the video shoot's moving stage drives away with Ali on it. As Tip and Phife run after the truck, the kids gathered outside the convenience store chase them. After catching up with it and getting on, Tip begins to rap. There are three main scenes: a gate area, the group on the stage, and Busta Rhymes on the deli's roof. Near the end if the video, when Tip says, "Take off your boots 'cause you can't run the race", the children stop running.

== Remixes and appearances ==
- A remix of the song was featured on the limited edition of The Love Movement. The percussion on the remix was subsequently sampled and used for the percussion of the Jay-Z song "Dead Presidents".
- Part of the song was re-recorded for the song "Intro-lude" on TLC's CrazySexyCool album.
- The song was featured in the controversial 1995 film Kids.
- The song appeared in the television series Black Lightning in the episode "The Book of War: Chapter Three: Liberation," when Khalil Payne, portrayed by Jordan Calloway, fought against Painkiller in his mind to take back control of himself.

== Charts ==
=== Weekly charts ===
| Chart (1994) | Peak position |
|---|---|
| UK Singles (Official Charts) | 81 |
| US Bubbling Under Hot 100 (Billboard) | 2 |
| US Dance Singles Sales (Billboard) | 2 |
| US Hot R&B/Hip-Hop Songs (Billboard) | 69 |
| US Hot Rap Songs (Billboard) | 15 |

=== Year-end charts ===
| Chart (1994) | Position |
|---|---|
| US Maxi-Singles Sales (Billboard) | 34 |
