= Electric Relaxation =

Single by A Tribe Called Quest

from the album Midnight Marauders
- B-side: "Midnight"
- Released: February 28, 1994
- Recorded: 1993
- Genre: Jazz rap; psychedelic rap
- Length: 3:45 (single); 4:04 (album)
- Label: Jive
- Songwriters: Kamaal Fareed; Ronnie Foster; Ali Shaheed Muhammad; Malik Taylor
- Producer: A Tribe Called Quest

A Tribe Called Quest singles chronology
| "Award Tour" (1993) | "Electric Relaxation" (1994) | "Oh My God" (1994) |

Music video
- "Electric Relaxation" on YouTube

"Electric Relaxation" is a song by American hip-hop group A Tribe Called Quest, released in February 1994 by Jive Records as the second single from their third album, Midnight Marauders (1993). It contains a sample of the song "Mystic Brew" by jazz organist Ronnie Foster and peaked at number 65 on the US Billboard Hot 100. The accompanying music video was directed by Josh Taft. The beat of the song was ranked as the third greatest hip-hop beat of all time by Rock the Bells in 2024. The track was featured as the opening theme song for The WB's black sitcom The Wayans Bros. for the first two seasons.

== Production ==
In a conversation with XXL, Phife Dawg revealed that the beat for "Electric Relaxation" was created in his grandmother's basement by Q-Tip:

I remember coming home from somewhere—my grandmother gave him a key, the whole nine, he used to just go in and do his thing—I came home from some trip and I walked in the kitchen, and you know, he's in the basement and you could hear the music coming up, and all I heard was that. I didn't even say hello to my grandmother or anyone else in the house, I was just like, "Hold on!" and went downstairs. "Yo, what the hell is that?!" He was like, "Yo, that shit is crazy, right?" And it has evolved into what it is now. ... On that record, he wrote my lines, and I wrote his—actually, we wrote our own lines, and when we recorded, we traded. That's why the whole back and forth, you know what I mean?

The song features multiple samples, including "Mystic Brew" by Ronnie Foster and "Outside Love" by Brethren.

== Critical reception ==
Andy Beevers from Music Week gave the song three out of five, saying, "These days ATCQ are a bit too left field to appeal to the masses, but they still have plenty of admirers." Pan-European magazine Music & Media wrote, "The tribe chills out on a soft jazzy beat. Even their raps are soothing and so slow that you can hear it word for word."

== Music video ==
The music video for "Electric Relaxation" was directed by American director Josh Taft and produced by Edward Rehfeldt. Taft also directed the video for the group's singles "Award Tour" and "Oh My God" from the same album.

== Charts ==
=== Weekly charts ===
| Chart (1994) | Peak position |
|---|---|
| UK Club Chart (Music Week) | 55 |
| US Billboard Hot 100 | 65 |
| US Dance Singles Sales (Billboard) | 2 |
| US Hot R&B/Hip-Hop Songs (Billboard) | 38 |
| US Hot Rap Songs (Billboard) | 13 |

=== Year-end charts ===
| Chart (1994) | Position |
|---|---|
| US Maxi-Singles Sales (Billboard) | 47 |

== Certifications ==
| Region | Certification | Certified units/sales |
|---|---|---|
| United Kingdom (BPI) | Silver | 200,000^{‡} |
^{‡} Sales+streaming figures based on certification alone.
