= V.I.P. (album) =

Studio album by Jungle Brothers
- Released: January 4, 2000
- Recorded: 1998–1999
- Studios: The Würx (New York City); Harold Dessau (New York City); Criteria (Miami, Florida); Gee Jam (Jamaica); Greene St. (New York City)
- Genre: Hip-hop
- Length: 1:14:46
- Labels: Gee Street; V2
- Producer: Alex Gifford

Jungle Brothers chronology
Raw Deluxe (1997)	V.I.P. (2000)	All That We Do (2002)

Singles from V.I.P.
- 1. "V.I.P." Released: 1999; 2. "Get Down" Released: 1999; 3. "Freakin' You" Released: 2000

V.I.P. is the fifth studio album by American hip-hop group the Jungle Brothers. It was released on January 4, 2000, via Gee Street/V2 Records. The recording sessions took place at The Würx, Harold Dessau Recording and Greene St. Recording in New York City, Criteria Recording Studios in Miami, and Geejam Studios in Jamaica. The album was produced by Alex Gifford of Propellerheads. It features guest appearances from Alex Gifford, the Holmes Brothers, Black Eyed Peas and Sense Live. The album peaked at number 50 on the US Heatseekers Albums and number 22 on the UK Independent Albums charts.

The album was supported by three charted singles: "V.I.P.", "Get Down" and "Freakin' You", which made it to the UK singles chart, peaking at No. 28, 52 and 70, respectively.

== Critical reception ==
Professional ratings
Review scores
Source	Rating
AllMusic	4/5 stars
Entertainment Weekly	C+
RapReviews	7.5/10
The Encyclopedia of Popular Music	3/5 stars
The New Rolling Stone Album Guide	2/5 stars
The Village Voice	(dud)

AllMusic called the album "fun, funky, and infectious -- a party record where everyone sounds like they're having a blast". Entertainment Weekly wrote that "excessively eclectic production ... smothers the hip-hop duo’s jazzily organic rhymes". The Riverfront Times called it "a great ... melding of progressive electronic grooves and rhymes, a contender for Album of the Year".

Salon wrote: "Most disturbing, the pallor of the dead lingers all over V.I.P. Not dead like Tupac and Biggie but, rather, the end of an era and a style, and of the individuals who were first responsible for those innovations".

== Track listing ==
No.	Title	Writer(s)	Producer(s)	Length
1.	"V.I.P."	Michael Small; Nathaniel Hall; Alex Gifford; Jules Leonard Kaye; Hugo Montenegro	Alex Gifford	5:54
2.	"I Remember" (featuring the Holmes Brothers)	Small; Hall; Gifford; Leon Huff; Kenneth Gamble	Gifford	6:30
3.	"Get Down"	Small; Hall; Gifford; C. Mickens; Eumir Deodato; George Brown; James "J.T." Taylor; Robert Bell; Robert "Spike" Mickens; Ronald Bell	Gifford	5:15
4.	"Early Morning"	Small; Hall; Gifford	Gifford	5:32
5.	"Down with the Jbeez" (featuring Black Eyed Peas, Sense Live and Alex Gifford)	Small; Hall; William Adams; Allan Pineda; Jaime Gomez; Miguel Rodriguez; Gifford	Gifford	8:43
6.	"The Brothers"	Small; Hall; Gifford	Gifford	5:02
7.	"Party Goin' On"	Small; Hall; Gifford	Gifford	1:55
8.	"Sexy Body"	Small; Hall; Gifford	Gifford	5:24
9.	"Playing for Keeps" (featuring the Holmes Brothers and Alex Gifford)	Small; Hall; Gifford	Gifford	6:38
10.	"Jbeez Rock the Dancehall"	Small; Hall; Gifford	Gifford	4:08
11.	"Freakin' You"	Small; Hall; Gifford	Gifford	6:13
12.	"Strictly Dedicated"	Small; Hall; Gifford	Gifford	9:07
13.	"Jungle Brother (True Blue) (Urban Takeover Mix)"	Small; Hall; Sammy Burwell; Michael Oliver	Jungle Brothers	4:25
Total length:				1:14:46

== Personnel ==
- Michael "Mike Gee" Small – vocals, executive producer, A&R
- Nathaniel "Afrika Baby Bam" Hall – vocals, executive producer, A&R
- Carol Cardenas – harmony vocals (tracks: 1, 3)
- Will White – drums (track 1)
- Sherman Holmes – harmony vocals (tracks: 2, 9)
- Wendell Holmes – harmony vocals (tracks: 2, 9)
- Popsy Dixon – harmony vocals (tracks: 2, 9)
- William "will.i.am" Adams Jr. – vocals (track 5)
- Allan "Apl.de.ap" Pineda – vocals (track 5)
- Jaime "Taboo" Gomez – vocals (track 5)
- Sense Live – vocals (track 5)
- Alex Gifford – vocals (tracks: 5, 9), producer (tracks: 1–12), recording, mixing
- Jemma Kennedy – harmony vocals (track 8)
- Huey Morgan – fierce guitar (track 8)
- Andi Carr – recording
- Prince Strickland III – recording
- Toby Whalen – recording
- Simon Davey – mastering
- Jon Baker – executive producer, A&R
- Michael "Mickey Finn" Hearn – remixing (track 13)
- Gavin "Aphrodite" King – remixing (track 13)
- Spiros Politis – photography
- Dominique Keegan – A&R

== Charts ==
Chart (1999–2000)	Peak position
Australian Albums (ARIA)	151
UK Independent Albums (Official Charts)	22
US Heatseekers Albums (Billboard)	50
