= Straight out the Jungle =

Studio album by Jungle Brothers
- Released: November 8, 1988
- Recorded: 1987–1988
- Genre: Hip hop
- Length: 48:31
- Label: Warlock
- Producers: Jungle Brothers; Todd Terry; Q-Tip

Jungle Brothers chronology
Straight out the Jungle (1988)	Done by the Forces of Nature (1989)

Straight out the Jungle is the debut album by the American hip hop group Jungle Brothers. The album marked the beginning of the Native Tongues collective, which later featured popular artists such as De La Soul, A Tribe Called Quest and Black Sheep. The album's masters have a lower quality to other hip-hop albums of its kind, compared to the singles.

The single "I'll House You", added to the album in late-1988 reissues, is known as the first non-Chicago hip-house record to be a sufficiently big club hit.

== Critical reception ==
Professional ratings
Review scores
Source	Rating
AllMusic	5/5 stars
The Guardian	3/5 stars
Mojo	4/5 stars
NME	9/10
The Philadelphia Inquirer	4/4 stars
Record Collector	4/5 stars
The Rolling Stone Album Guide	4/5 stars
The Source	5/5 stars
Spin Alternative Record Guide	9/10
The Village Voice	A−

The Los Angeles Times noted that, "From romance to racism, the JB's tell it like it is with a charismatic and suave funkiness." Trouser Press concluded that "despite strong entries like 'Because I Got It Like That' and 'Sounds of the Safari', several duff tracks diminish the album, while the vestigial old-school beats and rapping style leave the rest sounding dated."

In 1998, Straight out the Jungle was selected as one of The Source's "100 Best Albums". In 2022, Rolling Stone placed it at number 116 on their list of the "200 Greatest Hip-Hop Albums of All Time". The magazine's writer Christopher R. Weingarten said, "[T]he inaugural volley from the Native Tongues collective, the debut from the Jungle Brothers was a playful, loose, try-anything album that machete'd its own path." In 2025, Pitchfork placed it at number 71 on their list of the "100 Best Rap Albums of All Time". The website's writer Philip Sherburne said that the album's "funk breaks, rainforest sound effects, and call-and-response rapping established the sampledelic baseline for future Native Tongues classics from De La Soul and A Tribe Called Quest".

== Track listing ==
#	Title	Producer(s)	Performer (s)
1	"Straight Out the Jungle"	Jungle Brothers	Afrika Baby Bam, Mike Gee
2	"What's Going On"	Jungle Brothers	Afrika Baby Bam, Mike Gee
3	"Black Is Black"	Jungle Brothers	Afrika Baby Bam, Mike Gee, Q-Tip
4	"Jimbrowski"	Jungle Brothers	Afrika Baby Bam, Mike Gee
5	"I'm Gonna Do You"	Jungle Brothers	Afrika Baby Bam, Mike Gee
6	"I'll House You"	Todd Terry (uncredited)	Afrika Baby Bam, Mike Gee
7	"On the Run"	Jungle Brothers	Afrika Baby Bam, Mike Gee
8	"Behind the Bush"	Jungle Brothers	Afrika Baby Bam, Mike Gee
9	"Because I Got it Like That"	Jungle Brothers	Afrika Baby Bam, Mike Gee
10	"Braggin' & Boastin'"	Jungle Brothers	Afrika Baby Bam, Mike Gee
11	"Sounds of the Safari"	Jungle Brothers	*Instrumental*
12	"Jimmy's Bonus Beat"	Jungle Brothers	*Instrumental*
13	"The Promo"	Jungle Brothers, Q-Tip (uncredited)	Afrika Baby Bam, Mike Gee, Q-Tip

== Charts ==
=== Album ===
Chart (1988)	Peak position
Billboard Top R&B Albums	39

=== Singles ===
Year	Song	Chart	Peak
1989	"I'll House You"	Billboard Hot Rap Singles	16
1989	"I'll House You"	Billboard Hot Dance Music/Maxi-Singles Sales	28
