= All That We Do =

Studio album by Jungle Brothers
- Released: October 29, 2002
- Recorded: 2002
- Genre: Hip hop
- Length: 43:06
- Label: Jungle Brother
- Producer: Jungle Brothers; Todd Terry

Jungle Brothers chronology
V.I.P. (2000)	All That We Do (2002)	I Got You (2006)

Professional ratings
Review scores
Source	Rating
AllMusic	3/5 stars
The New Rolling Stone Album Guide	2/5 stars

All That We Do is the sixth studio album by hip hop group Jungle Brothers. It was released in 2002. It was released in Germany as "You In My Hut Now" with track listing changes.

== Track listing ==
1. “Booty Trap”
2. “Candy”
3. “Let Me”
4. “You In My Hut Now”
5. “All That We Do” (intro)
6. “All That We Do”
7. “Love & Hate”
8. “Something About Cha”
9. “Let’s Get Away”
10. “Do Your Thing”
11. “Buggin”
12. “What’s the Five O”
