= Nathan Brackett =

American journalist

Nathan Brackett is a former music journalist and as of October 2016, an executive at Amazon Music.

== Career ==
Brackett started his career at Musician Magazine in 1991 and worked his way up to associate editor. In 1996, he left Musician, and took a role as the music editor of Time Out New York.

Nathan left Time Out for Rolling Stone in 1996 when he took the position of associate editor. In 2001, he was promoted to senior editor. In 2007 he took the role of editor of the online property, RollingStone.com. In 2007 he also became deputy managing director of Rolling Stone, where he remained until 2013 when he became executive editor of all of Rolling Stone.

In 2016, he left the top role at Rolling Stone for a position as head of editorial at Amazon Music.
