= It's a Shame (My Sister) =

Single by Monie Love featuring True Image

from the album Down to Earth
- B-side: "Cool as mix"
- Released: 4 December 1990
- Recorded: 1990
- Genre: R&B; hip hop
- Length: 3:43
- Label: Cooltempo; Warner Bros.
- Songwriters: Stevie Wonder; David Steele; Monie Love; Lee Garrett; Syreeta Wright
- Producers: Andy Cox; David Steele

Monie Love featuring True Image singles chronology
"Monie in the Middle" (1990)	"It's a Shame (My Sister)" (1990)	"Down to Earth" (1990)

"It's a Shame (My Sister)" is a song recorded by British rapper Monie Love, featuring True Image. It was the second single from her 1990 debut album, Down to Earth, and was released in late 1990 in Germany and the UK and in early 1991 in other European countries by Cooltempo and Warner Bros. The song samples the Spinners' 1970 single "It's a Shame", written for the band by Stevie Wonder. The "Cool as..." remix of the track samples the guitar riff from the Sister Sledge 1979 hit "He's the Greatest Dancer". The song had some success, particularly in Switzerland, where it peaked at number six and charted for 21 weeks. In the United States, it was Monie Love's sole hit single, reaching numbers 26 and 55 on the US Billboard Hot 100 and Cash Box Top 100 charts. "It's a Shame (My Sister)" also peaked at number two on the American dance chart.

== Track listings ==
- 7" single
1. "It's a Shame (My Sister)" (Album version) – 3:43
2. "It's a Shame (My Sister)" (Cool as... mix) – 6:35
- CD maxi
1. "It's a Shame (My Sister)" (Album version) – 3:43
2. "It's a Shame (My Sister)" (Ultimatum mix) – 5:29
3. "It's a Shame (My Sister)" (Cool as... mix) – 6:35
- 12" maxi/cassette
1. "It's a Shame (My Sister)" (Monie dee mix) – 5:28
2. "It's a Shame (My Sister)" (Ultimatum mix) – 5:29
3. "It's a Shame (My Sister)" (Def reprise) – 2:30
4. "It's a Shame (My Sister)" (Cool as... mix) – 6:35
5. "It's a Shame (My Sister)" (Red zone mix) – 4:30
6. "Race Against Reality" – 3:03
- CD single – promo
1. "It's a Shame (My Sister)" (Album version) – 3:43
2. "It's a Shame (My Sister)" (Cool as... mix – edit) – 3:34
3. "It's a Shame (My Sister)" (Cool as... mix) – 6:35
4. "It's a Shame (My Sister)" (Ultimatum mix) – 5:29
5. "It's a Shame (My Sister)" (Hot shot mix) – 7:12

== Credits ==
- Written by Stevie Wonder, David Steele, Monie Love, Lee Garrett, and Syreeta Wright
- Background vocals by True Image
- Produced by Andy Cox and David Steele
- Remixes by David Morales, Ultimatum, and John Waddell
- Artwork by Eddie Monsoon

== Charts ==
=== Weekly charts ===
Chart (1990–1991)	Peak position
Australia (ARIA)	90
Austria (Ö3 Austria Top 40)	12
Europe (Eurochart Hot 100)	42
France (SNEP)	50
Germany (Official German Charts)	11
Greece (IFPI)	6
Luxembourg (Radio Luxembourg)	11
Netherlands (Dutch Top 40)	9
Netherlands (Single Top 100)	9
Switzerland (Schweizer Hitparade)	6
UK Singles (OCC)	12
UK Dance (Music Week)	2
UK Club Chart (Record Mirror)	1
US Billboard Hot 100	26
US Hot Dance Club Play (Billboard)	2
US Hot R&B Singles (Billboard)	8
US Cash Box Top 100	55

=== Year-end charts ===
Chart (1990)	Position
UK Club Chart (Record Mirror)	4
