= Jungle Brothers =

American hip hop trio

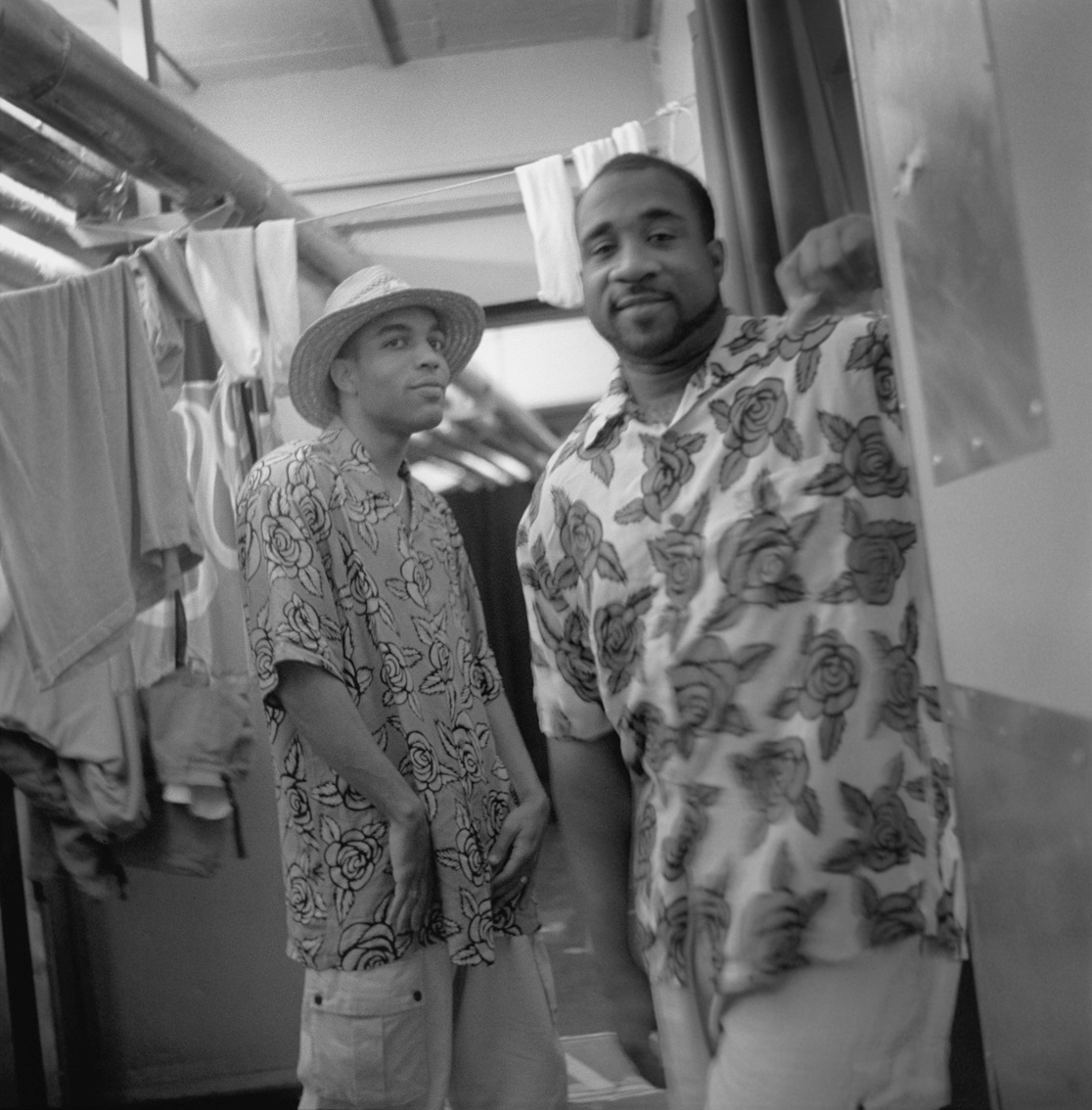
- The Jungle Brothers visiting Hamburg, Germany in March 1999.

Background information
- Origin: New York City, U.S.
- Genres: Golden age hip hop; progressive rap; psychedelic rap
- Works: Jungle Brothers discography
- Years active: 1987–present
- Labels: Warlock; Warner Bros.; Gee Street; V2; Jungle Brother
- Members: Mike Gee; Afrika Baby Bam
- Past members: DJ Sammy B (1987 - 2024)
- Website: www.junglebrothers4life.com

Jungle Brothers are an American hip hop duo composed of Michael Small (Mike Gee) and Nathaniel Hall (Afrika Baby Bam). Hailed as pioneers of the fusion of jazz, hip-hop, and house music, they were the first hip-hop group to collaborate with a house-music producer. The trio released their debut album, Straight out the Jungle, in July 1988. Their hip-house club hit single, "I'll House You" was added to the album in late-1988 reissues. Fostered by Kool DJ Red Alert, the Jungle Brothers' success influenced De La Soul, A Tribe Called Quest, and eventually the Native Tongues collective that they founded.

== History ==
The group's first album, Straight out the Jungle, was released in 1988 on Warlock Records, an independent record label. Soon after, they were signed by Warner Bros. Records, with whom the group released Done By the Forces of Nature in November 1989. In 1990, the Jungle Brothers contributed the song "I Get a Kick" to the Cole Porter tribute album Red Hot + Blue produced by the Red Hot Organization. Following a four-year break, the Jungle Brothers returned in 1993 with J Beez Wit the Remedy. Their fifth album, V.I.P., was produced by Alex Gifford of Propellerheads and, during production, they added their vocal stylings to the Propellerheads tracks "Take California (And Party)" and "You Want It Back". Their latest album to contain new material is 2002's All That We Do.

In 2001, the group's song "What's the Five 0" was featured in the music video game FreQuency.

In 2004, the Jungle Brothers joined with British producer Mr On to produce "Breathe (Don't Stop)", a version of "Breathe and Stop" by Q-Tip of A Tribe Called Quest, combined with a sample of Michael Jackson's "Don't Stop 'Til You Get Enough" (the idea was taken from a bootleg remix combining vocals from "Breathe and Stop" and music from "Don't Stop 'Til You Get Enough").

In 2005, the Jungle Brothers released a greatest hits and classic remixes and rarities double album, This Is..., which included remixes by The Wiseguys, Urban Takeover, Natural Born Chillers, and Stereo MCs.

== Discography ==
=== Studio albums ===
- Straight out the Jungle (1988)
- Done by the Forces of Nature (1989)
- J Beez wit the Remedy (1993)
- Raw Deluxe (1997)
- V.I.P. (2000)
- All That We Do (2002)
- I Got U (2006)
- Keep It Jungle (2020)
