= Monie Love =

British rapper (born 1970)

- Born: Simone Gooden; 2 July 1970 (age 56); Battersea, London, England
- Genre: Progressive rap
- Occupations: Rapper; actress
- Years active: 1987–present
- Labels: Warner Bros.; Cooltempo/Chrysalis/EMI; Tuff Groove
- Website: twitter.com/DaRealMonieLove

Simone Johnson (born Simone Gooden) (born 2 July 1970), better known by her stage name Monie Love, is an English rapper, actress, and radio personality known for her singles during the late 1980s and the 1990s. Love is a radio personality for urban adult contemporary station KISS 104.1 WALR-FM in Atlanta. Love is a pioneer female emcee, a two-time Grammy Award nominee, the first British female hip-hop artist to hold that distinction.

== Career ==
=== Music ===
Love's debut studio album, Down to Earth, was released on 6 November 1990. It spawned the singles "Monie in the Middle" (a track dealing with a woman's right to determine what she wants out of a relationship) and "It's a Shame (My Sister)" (which sampled the (Detroit) Spinners' "It's a Shame", written for the band by the US musician Stevie Wonder). It also featured house-music vocalist and then-labelmate Ultra Naté. The album reached No. 26 on the Top R&B/Hip-Hop Albums chart. Love also appears on the song titled "United" from Inner City's third album, Praise, and raps a response verse from the woman's perspective on a 1989 remix of the Fine Young Cannibals hit, "She Drives Me Crazy".

Love was featured on the LA Reid & Babyface remix of Whitney Houston's R&B hit "My Name Is Not Susan" in 1991, and appeared in the music video alongside Houston. Love's 1992 single "Full-Term Love", from the Class Act movie soundtrack, reached No. 7 on the Hot Hip-Hop Singles chart. Love collaborated with Marley Marl on her second album, In a Word or 2 (1993), which featured the Prince-produced single "Born To B.R.E.E.D." (which reached No. 1 on the Hot Dance Music chart and No. 7 on the Hot Rap Singles chart), as well as a re-release of "Full-Term Love". The same year, Prince asked her to write lyrics for a few songs on a side-project, Carmen Electra's eponymous album, Carmen Electra. Love's last release as lead artist was the single "Slice of da Pie" in 2000. In 2013, she was featured on the track "Sometimes" by Ras Kass, from his album Barmageddon, and in 2021, she released a single called “Divine”, featuring Skyzoo and a friend of theirs called Tuff.

=== US radio ===
From 2004 until the week of 11 December 2006, Love was the morning drive host on Philadelphia's WPHI-FM 100.3. The Philadelphia Daily News confirmed on 22 December that Love left WPHI-FM on amicable terms after contract negotiations stalled. Love's departure from WPHI followed soon after her December 2006 interview with Young Jeezy, where the two argued over whether hip hop is dead. Love is also an official MySpace.com DJ, according to her Myspace page. She has a radio show on XM Satellite Radio called Ladies First Radio with Monie Love. It airs Thursdays 6 PM ET and Sundays 8 PM ET. In 2015, Love became a DJ on Philadelphia's Boom 107.9, hosting a morning show from 6 am to 10 am. In 2016, Love co-hosted with Ed Lover on the Ed Lover Morning Show for "Boom 92" KROI in Houston, Texas. In 2018, Monie Love did the workday and lunch break from 10am-3pm on 106.7 WTLC in Indianapolis, Indiana. In May 2019, she began hosting afternoons at "KISS 104.1" WALR in Atlanta.

== Personal life ==
Born in England to a jazz musician father, Love has two brothers, Richard and David Gooden (known as Dave Angel), and a sister named Rosanna Sharian Gooden (who is a singer known as Baz). Love moved to America, settling in New York City in March 1988. She has four children. She has been married twice and is a single mother. She is of Jamaican descent.

== Discography ==
=== Studio albums ===
- Down to Earth (1990)
- In a Word or 2 (1993)
