= Gravediggaz discography =

Gravediggaz is an American hip hop group from New York notable for pioneering the horrorcore lyrical style.

== Albums ==
=== Studio albums ===
Year	Title	Chart positions									
Year	Title	U.S.	U.S. R&B	AUS	UK	GER	FRA	NL	FIN	SE	NZ
1994	6 Feet Deep: Released: August 9, 1994; Label: Gee Street	36	6	—	—	—	—	—	—	—	—
1997	The Pick, the Sickle and the Shovel: Released: October 14, 1997; Label: Gee Street	20	7	79	24	36	25	87	36	28	39
2002	Nightmare in A-Minor: Released: April 9, 2002; Label: Empire	–	38	—	—	—	—	—	—	—	—

=== EPs ===
Year	Album	Chart positions
Year	Album	UK
1995	Six Feet Deep E.P.: Released: 1995; Label: Gee Street	
1995	The Hell E.P.: Released: March 9, 1995; Label: 4th & B'way	12

=== Compilations ===
Year	Album
2004	6 Feet Under: Released: March 30, 2004; Label: Cleopatra

== Singles ==
Year	Single	Chart positions				Album
Year	Single	U.S. Hot 100	U.S. R&B	U.S. Rap	UK	Album
1994	"Diary of a Madman"	82	57	8	–	6 Feet Deep
1994	"Nowhere to Run, Nowhere to Hide"	–	–	32	–	6 Feet Deep
1995	"1-800 Suicide"	–	–	46	–	6 Feet Deep
1997	"Dangerous Mindz"	–	–	–	–	The Pick, the Sickle and the Shovel
1997	"The Night the Earth Cried"	–	–	–	44	The Pick, the Sickle and the Shovel
1998	"Unexplained"	–	–	–	48	The Pick, the Sickle and the Shovel
2002	"False Things Must Perish"	–	–	–	–	Nightmare in A-Minor
