= Demon Knight (soundtrack) =

Soundtrack album by various artists
- Released: January 10, 1995
- Studios: Pantego Sound Studio (Pantego, TX); Studio D. (Sausalito, CA); Pajama Recording Studios (Oakland, CA); Fat Planet (Phoenix, AZ); AmRep Recording Division; A&M Studios (Hollywood, CA); Rockfield Studios (South Wales, UK); Firehouse Studio (New York, NY); GLC Sound Studios (New York, NY); Greene St. Recording (New York, NY)
- Genres: Thrash metal; alternative rock; industrial rock; post-punk; hip-hop
- Length: 41:00
- Label: Atlantic
- Producers: Andy Wallace; Biohazard; Dave Mustaine; Filter; Hypo Luxa & Hermes Pan; Machine Head; Max Norman; Melvins; Prince Paul; Terry Date; Theo Van Rock; Vincent Wojno

Singles from Demon Knight
- 1. "1-800 Suicide" Released: January 24, 1995

Professional ratings
Review scores
Source	Rating
AllMusic	3/5 stars

Demon Knight is the original soundtrack album to Ernest Dickerson's 1995 black horror comedy film Demon Knight. It was released on January 10, 1995 through Atlantic Records and mostly consisted of heavy metal and alternative rock music, with "1-800 Suicide" by the Gravediggaz being the only hip-hop song. The soundtrack peaked at 157 on the Billboard 200.

== Track listing ==
No.	Title	Writer(s)	Producer(s)	Length
1.	"Cemetery Gates (Demon Knight Edit)" (performed by Pantera)	Pantera	Terry Date; Pantera (co.)	5:47
2.	"Tonight We Murder" (performed by Ministry)	Alejandro Ramírez Casas; Paul Barker; Frank Nardiello	Hypo Luxa; Hermes Pan	3:56
3.	"My Misery (Demon Knight)" (performed by Machine Head)	Lawrence Matthew Cardine	Vincent Wojno; Machine Head	4:28
4.	"Diadems" (performed by Megadeth)	David Scott Mustaine	Max Norman; Dave Mustaine	4:17
5.	"Instant Larry" (performed by Melvins)	Melvins	Melvins	4:06
6.	"Fall Guy" (performed by Rollins Band)	Rollins Band	Theo Van Rock	3:53
7.	"Beaten" (performed by Biohazard)	Biohazard	Biohazard	3:10
8.	"Polícia" (performed by Sepultura)	Antonio Bellotto	Andy Wallace; Sepultura (co.)	1:46
9.	"Hey Man Nice Shot" (performed by Filter)	Richard Patrick	Filter	5:20
10.	"1-800 Suicide" (performed by Gravediggaz)	Anthony Berkeley; Robert Diggs; Arnold Hamilton; Paul Huston	Prince Paul	4:17
Total length:				41:00

Notes

- Tracks 5, 7 and 8 did not appear in the film. The songs "Mustang Sally" by Wilson Pickett, "Baby I Love You" by Aretha Franklin and "Rapp Payback (Where Iz Moses)" by James Brown were used instead.

== Personnel ==
- Terry Date – mixing & engineering (track 1)
- Pantera – mixing (track 1)
- Vincent Wojno – mixing & engineering (track 3)
- Machine Head – mixing (track 3)
- Max Norman – mixing (track 4)
- Dave Mustaine – mixing (track 4)
- Bruce Jacoby – engineering (track 4)
- Tim Mac – engineering (track 5)
- Theo Van Rock – mixing (track 6)
- Peter Rave – mixing & engineering (track 6)
- Randall Wine – mixing & engineering (track 7)
- Ken Villeneuve – mixing & engineering (track 7)
- Biohazard – mixing (track 7)
- Andy Wallace – mixing & engineering (track 8)
- Bill Kennedy – mixing (track 9)
- "Prince Paul" Huston – mixing (track 10)
- Scott Harding – engineering (track 10)
- Stephen Marcussen – mastering
- Andrew Leary – executive producer
- Richard Donner – co-producer
- David Giler – co-producer
- Walter Hill – co-producer
- Joel Silver – co-producer
- Robert Zemeckis – co-producer
- Dan Cracchiolo – associate producer
- Kevin Weaver – soundtrack director
- Ron Laffitte – music consultant
- Harry Garfield – music consultant
- Peter Sorel – photography
- Robert Isenberg – photography

== Charts ==
Chart (1995)	Peak position
Australian Albums (ARIA)	34
Austrian Albums (Ö3 Austria)	13
German Albums (Offizielle Top 100)	83
UK Compilation Albums (Official Charts)	50
UK Rock & Metal Albums (Official Charts)	14
US Billboard 200	157
