= Barbara Cameron =

Barbara Cameron may refer to:

== Entertainment ==
- Barbara Cameron (1926–2013), American singer-songwriter, of The Road Runner Show theme songs etc.
- Barbara Cameron, American model, see List of Playboy Playmates of 1955 § November
- Barbara Cameron (born 1950), American actress, mother of actors Kirk Cameron and Candace Cameron Bure, see List of TV Guide covers (1990s) § 1990

== Writers ==
- Barbara Anne Cameron (born 1938), Canadian writer
- Barbara Cameron (born 1956), American author and restaurateur, see American Literary Review § Prize winners

== Others ==
- Barbara Cameron, Canadian politician and 1974 Communist Party candidate for St. Paul's electoral district, Toronto
- Barbara May Cameron (1954–2002), American lesbian and Native Indian human rights activist
- Barbara Cameron (bowls) (born 1962), Northern Irish lawn bowler

== See also ==
- Cameron (surname)
