= Insomnia (Erick Sermon album) =

Compilation album by Erick Sermon
- Released: April 23, 1996
- Recorded: 1994–1995
- Studio: Mirror Image (Dix Hills, NY); The Music Palace (West Hempstead, NY); Rockin' Reel Recording Studios (East Northport, NY); Chuck Simone Studio
- Genre: East Coast hip hop; hardcore hip hop
- Length: 42:29
- Label: Def Squad; Rockin' Reel; Interscope
- Producer: Erick Sermon (also exec.); Redman; Rockwilder; Sugarless

Erick Sermon chronology
Double or Nothing (1995)	Insomnia (1996)	El Niño (1998)

Singles from Insomnia
- 1. "Funkorama" Released: December 19, 1995; 2. "It's That Hit" Released: 1995; 3. "I Feel It" Released: June 4, 1996

Professional ratings
Review scores
Source	Rating
AllMusic	4.5/5 stars
RapReviews	6/10
The Source	3/5 stars

Insomnia is a hip-hop compilation album presented by American rapper and record producer Erick Sermon. It was released on April 23, 1996, via his label Def Squad Records and Interscope Records. The recording sessions took place at Mirror Image, at the Music Palace, and at Rockin' Reel Recording Studios in New York, and at Chuck Simone Studio. The album was produced by Sermon, who also served as executive producer, Redman, Rockwilder, and Ty Fyffe. Beside Sermon, it features contributions from fellow artists affiliated with or discovered by him, such as Calif, Domo, Duo, Jamal, Keith Murray, L.O.D., Passion, Redman, the Wixtons, Xross-Breed, and Thomas "Tommy Gunn" Blincoe, who was murdered shortly before the album's release, and to whom the album is dedicated. The album peaked at number 53 on the Billboard 200 and number 10 on the Top R&B/Hip-Hop Albums in the United States. It spawned three singles: "Funkorama", which peacked at No. 81 on the Billboard Hot 100, "It's That Hit" and "I Feel It".

== Track listing ==
No.	Title	Writer(s)	Producer(s)	Length
1.	"Intro" (performed by Cherry Martinez)			0:31
2.	"Funkorama" (performed by Redman)	Reginald Noble; Jonathan Davis; Ali Shaheed Muhammad; Malik Taylor; Mark Morales; Darren Robinson; Damon Wimbley	Redman; Erick Sermon (co.)	3:03
3.	"The Vibe" (performed by Xross-Breed)	L. Scott; Dana Stinson; Noble	Redman	3:10
4.	"As the..." (performed by Passion)	Passion Johnson; Erick Sermon	Sermon	3:14
5.	"Beez Like That (Sometimes)" (performed by Jamal and Calif)	Jamal Phillips; Calif Moore; E. Sermon; Stinson; Wayne Shorter	Sermon; Rockwilder (co.)	2:52
6.	"It's That Hit" (performed by Keith Murray)	Keith Murray; E. Sermon; Bob James; Claude Johnson; George Clinton, Jr.; Roy C. Hammond; William Collins	Sermon	4:06
7.	"Up Jump the Boogie" (performed by the Wixtons)	E. Woodson; E. Sermon; Tyrone Fyffe	Sermon; Sugarless (co.)	4:08
8.	"Caller's Interlude" (performed by Cherry Martinez)			2:28
9.	"I Feel It" (performed by L.O.D.)	Gerald Berlin; Ron Joseph; E. Sermon; Douglas E. Davis; Ricky Walters; Tom Browne; Thomassina Carrollyne Smith	Sermon	4:24
10.	"On the Regular" (performed by Duo)	T. Stanley; Kim Sermon; E. Sermon; Collins; Clinton, Jr.; Maceo Parker	Sermon	3:11
11.	"Fear" (performed by Tommy Gunn)	Thomas Blincoe; E. Sermon	Sermon	3:57
12.	"Ready for War" (performed by Domo)	D. Paige; E. Sermon	Sermon	3:36
13.	"Reign" (performed by Erick Sermon)	E. Sermon; Rick James	Sermon	3:49
Total length:				42:29

Sample credits

- Track 2 contains sample of "Midnight" as performed by A Tribe Called Quest and elements from "Stick 'Em" as performed by the Fat Boys
- Track 5 contains sample of "Black Thorne Rose" as performed by Weather Report
- Track 6 contains sample of "Bootzilla" as performed by Bootsy's Rubber Band, a sample of "Impeach the President" as performed by the Honeydrippers and a portion of the composition "I Want to Thank You"
- Track 9 contains elements from "Funkin' for Jamaica" as performed by the Mindbenders and elements from "The Show" as performed by Doug E. Fresh
- Track 10 contains sample from "Aah...The Name Is Bootsy, Baby"
- Track 13 contains a sample of "All Night Long" as performed by the Mary Jane Girls

== Personnel ==
- Erick Sermon – executive producer, vocals (track 13), producer (tracks: 4–7, 9–13), co-producer (track 2), sleeve notes
- Reginald "Redman" Noble – vocals (track 2), producer (tracks: 2, 3), sleeve notes
- L. "Kewjo" Scott – vocals (track 3), sleeve notes
- Dana "Rockwilder" Stinson – vocals (track 3), co-producer (track 5), sleeve notes
- Passion Johnson – vocals (track 4), sleeve notes
- Jamal "Mally G" Phillips – vocals (track 5), sleeve notes
- Calif Moore – vocals (track 5), sleeve notes
- Keith Murray – vocals (track 6), sleeve notes
- The Wixtons – vocals (track 7)
- Gerald "50 Grand" Berlin – vocals (track 9), sleeve notes
- Ron "Ron Jay" Joseph – vocals (track 9), sleeve notes
- T. "T-Man" Stanley – vocals (track 10), sleeve notes
- Kim "Big Kim" Sermon – vocals (track 10), sleeve notes
- Thomas "Tommy Gunn" Blincoe – vocals (track 11), sleeve notes
- Domo Paige – vocals (track 12), sleeve notes
- Deborah "Cherry Martinez" Tennyson – voice (tracks: 1, 8)
- Tyrone "Ty" Fyffe – co-producer (track 7)
- Troy Hightower – recording, mixing
- Bob Fudjinski – recording
- Chuck Simone – recording
- Dave Greenberg – recording
- Tommy Uzzo – mixing
- Tony Dawsey – mastering
- Mike Hogan – engineering assistant
- Cathrine Wessel – photography
- Jah Boogie – sleeve notes
- Shugar Diamonds – sleeve notes

== Chart history ==
Chart (1996)	Peak position
US Billboard 200	53
US Top R&B/Hip-Hop Albums (Billboard)	10
