= 1-800 Suicide =

1995 Gravediggaz single

Single by Gravediggaz

from the album 6 Feet Deep and Demon Knight (soundtrack)
- B-side: "Mommy, What's a Gravedigga?"
- Released: January 24, 1995
- Recorded: 1994
- Genre: Horrorcore
- Length: 4:18
- Label: Gee Street
- Songwriter(s): Gravediggaz
- Producer(s): Prince Paul

Gravediggaz singles chronology
"Nowhere to Run, Nowhere to Hide" (1994)	"1-800 Suicide" (1995)	"Dangerous Mindz" (1997)

"1-800 Suicide" is the third and final single released from the Gravediggaz' debut album, 6 Feet Deep. Produced by Prince Paul (The Undertaker), "1-800 Suicide" was the Gravediggaz final charting single, making it to 46 on the Hot Rap Singles. The song was paired with "Mommy, What's a Gravedigga?" as a Double A-Side, although Gee Street also released "1-800 Suicide" and "Mommy, What's a Gravedigga?" as individuals with exactly the same cover art. The song can also be found on the soundtrack of the 1995 film Tales from the Crypt presents: Demon Knight, and as the opening theme song for The Leftovers Season 3 episode "Certified".

Complex ranked "1-800-Suicide" at #22 on their list of the 25 most violent rap songs of all time.

== Single track listing ==
=== A-Side 1 ===
1. "1-800-Suicide" (Clean Version) – 4:18
2. "1-800-Suicide" – 4:18
3. "1-800-Suicide" (Instrumental Version) – 3:41

=== A-Side 2 ===
1. "Mommy What's a Gravedigga?" (Clean RZA Mix) – 4:08
2. "Mommy What's a Gravedigga?" (RZA Mix Instrumental) – 3:34
3. "Mommy What's a Gravedigga?" – 1:44
4. "Mommy What's a Gravedigga?" (Album Instrumental) – 1:40

== Charts ==
Chart (1995)	Peak position
Billboard Hot Rap Singles	46
Billboard Hot Dance Music/Maxi-Singles Sales	29

== See also ==
- 1-800-273-8255
- 1-800-273-8255 (song)
