= List of TV Guide covers (1990s) =

This is a list of issue covers of TV Guide magazine from the decade of the 1990s, from January 1990 to December 1999. The entries on this table include each cover's subjects and their artists (photographer or illustrator). This list is for the regular weekly issues of TV Guide, and includes covers that are national or regional in nature, along with any covers that were available exclusively to subscribers. Any one-time-only special issues of TV Guide are not included.

== 1990 ==
Issue date	Cover subject	Type of cover	Artist
1990-01-06	Rock Hudson; Inset: "Zapped" featuring John Tesh, Zsa Zsa Gabor, Andrew Dice Clay, Cher, Roseanne Barr and Tom Arnold	Photograph	
1990-01-13	Roseanne Barr of Roseanne and Craig T. Nelson of Coach	Illustration	John Solie
1990-01-20	"Dynamite Dozen: 12 Who Will Blaze Across The Decade", featuring Catherine Crier of CNN, Arsenio Hall of The Arsenio Hall Show, and Dana Delany of China Beach	Photo montage	Tony Costa
1990-01-27	"Super Bowl Spectacular" and Harrison Ford of Indiana Jones and the Last Crusade; Inset: Charlie Brown, Bugs Bunny, and Fred Flintstone	Word illustration/photograph	
1990-02-03	"Oh, What A Week!" featuring Lesley Ann Warren of Family of Spies: The Walker Spy Ring; Anna Maria Horsford and Clifton Davis of Amen; Jennifer Grey of Murder in Mississippi; and Sammy Davis Jr., Goldie Hawn, Frank Sinatra, Steve Lawrence & Eydie Gormé of Sammy Davis Jr's 60th Anniversary Celebration	Photo montage	
1990-02-10	"A Valentine Guide to TV Romance", featuring couples Michael Tucker & Jill Eikenberry, Maury Povich & Connie Chung, and Patricia Wettig & Ken Olin	Photo montage	
1990-02-17	Michael St. Gerard as Elvis Presley of the TV series Elvis	Photo montage	
1990-02-24	Space Shuttle Challenger; Brian Kerwin, Joe Morton, Julie Fulton, Richard Jenkins, Barry Bostwick, Karen Allen, & Keone Young of the film Challenger	Photo montage	Challenger photo by NASA; cast photo by Danny Field
1990-03-03	"Parent's Guide to Children's Television", featuring Fred Savage of The Wonder Years, characters from Muppet Babies, Babar the Elephant, Winnie the Pooh, Fred Rogers of Mister Rogers' Neighborhood, and Pee-wee Herman of Pee-wee's Playhouse	Photo montage	
1990-03-10	Larry Drake, Susan Ruttan, Corbin Bernsen, Alan Rachins, Jimmy Smits, Richard A. Dysart, Michelle Greene, Michael Tucker, Susan Dey, Blair Underwood, Harry Hamlin, and Jill Eikenberry of L.A. Law; Insets: Bob Newhart and Jane Pauley	Photograph	
1990-03-17	Bart, Lisa, Maggie, Marge, and Homer of The Simpsons; Inset: Timothy Busfield of Thirtysomething	Illustration	
1990-03-24	"Oscar Night" preview, featuring host Billy Crystal; Inset: Paula Zahn	Photograph	
1990-03-31	"Here's lookin' at you, America!" with Bob Saget of America's Funniest Home Videos pointing a video camera towards the reader	Photograph	Tony Costa
1990-04-07	"Spring Fling!" featuring Valerie Bertinelli of Sydney; Michael Woods, Lloyd Bridges, Helen Slater, of Capital News; and Carol Burnett of Carol & Company	Photo montage	
1990-04-14	"America's Top TV Critics Tell: What's In, What's Out"	Illustration	
1990-04-21	Arnold Schwarzenegger on the week of his directorial debut (on Tales from the Crypt)	Photograph	
1990-04-28	"May Sweeps", featuring Robin Williams, Whoopi Goldberg and Billy Crystal of HBO's Comic Relief '90; The Kentucky Derby; the television film The Beach Boys Story; and the video release of The Little Mermaid	Photo montage	
1990-05-05	Oprah Winfrey of Brewster Place	Photograph	
1990-05-12	Barbara Cameron with son Kirk and his Growing Pains castmate Joanna Kerns	Photograph	
1990-05-19	Carol Burnett of Carol & Company	Illustration	Al Hirschfeld
1990-05-26	"TV Goes to the Movies", featuring Madonna in Dick Tracy, Michael J. Fox and Christopher Lloyd in Back to the Future Part III, and James Woods and Melanie Griffith in Women and Men: Stories of Seduction	Photo montage	
1990-06-02	"Summer Shape-Up Special", featuring Barbara Crampton of The Young and the Restless and Steve Bond of Santa Barbara	Photograph	
1990-06-09	"America's New Love Affair with Cartoons", featuring Bart Simpson, Teenage Mutant Ninja Turtles, and The Little Mermaid	Illustration	
1990-06-16	Dana Delany of China Beach	Photograph	Mario Casilli
1990-06-23	"TV Person of the Year": Arsenio Hall of The Arsenio Hall Show	Photograph	Charles William Bush
1990-06-30	"Your Summer TV Survival Guide", featuring Jose Canseco of the Oakland Athletics, Carey Lowell and Timothy Dalton of the film Licence to Kill, and Isabella Rossellini and John Lithgow of The Last Elephant	Photo montage	
1990-07-07	"The Best and Worst We Saw", featuring the Newhart finale, the Energizer Bunny, Twin Peaks, Andrew Dice Clay, Baywatch, Prime Time Live, and Chicken Soup	Photo montage/illustration	
1990-07-14	Sinbad, Dawnn Lewis, Jasmine Guy and Kadeem Hardison of A Different World	Photograph	
1990-07-21	"TV's Top Teen Super Stars", featuring Malcolm-Jamal Warner of The Cosby Show, David Faustino of Married... with Children, Neil Patrick Harris of Doogie Howser, M.D., and Alyssa Milano of Who's the Boss?	Photo montage	
1990-07-28	"Guide to Home Video's High-Flying New Season", featuring Peter Pan; Inset: Rue McClanahan of The Golden Girls	Illustration	
1990-08-04	"Dressed to Thrill", featuring Candice Bergen of Murphy Brown, Nicollette Sheridan of Knots Landing, and Kirstie Alley of Cheers	Photo montage	
1990-08-11	"Special Report: TV, Sports and Money", featuring Michael Jordan, Joe Montana, and Bo Jackson	Illustration	
1990-08-18	Dixie Carter, Jean Smart, Delta Burke, and Annie Potts of Designing Women	Illustration	
1990-08-25	"1990 Beauty Poll Results", featuring Nicollette Sheridan, Jaclyn Smith, and Dana Delany	Photo montage	
1990-09-01	"MTV: Why Women Now Rule Rock", featuring Madonna and Janet Jackson & Paula Abdul	Photo montage	
1990-09-08	Sheryl Lee, Lara Flynn Boyle, and Peggy Lipton of Twin Peaks	Photograph	
1990-09-15	Fall Preview	Illustration	Mike Radencich
1990-09-22	"Fall Preview II" featuring Bill Cosby of The Cosby Show and (resting on Cosby's shoulder) Bart Simpson of The Simpsons	Photograph	
1990-09-29	"Fall Preview III: The Hot New Faces of Fall", featuring Lenny Clarke of Lenny, Will Smith of The Fresh Prince of Bel-Air, and Laila Robins of Gabriel's Fire	Photograph	Mario Casilli
1990-10-06	"Fall Preview IV: What's Best... and What's Waiting in the Wings"	Illustration	Michael D. Radencich
1990-10-13	"A High-School Report Card on the New Teen Shows", featuring Corin Nemec of Parker Lewis Can't Lose, Will Smith of The Fresh Prince of Bel-Air, and Charlie Schlatter of Ferris Bueller; Inset: The film Pretty Woman (on the week of its home video release) and the 1990 World Series	Photo montage	
1990-10-20	"The Best and Worst Dressed on TV", featuring Marge Simpson, Delta Burke, and Oprah Winfrey	Photo montage	
1990-10-27	"Why We Go Batty for Horror on TV", featuring Ari Lehman, The Crypt-Keeper, Ben Cross, and Robert Englund	Illustration/photo montage	
1990-11-03	"A November to Remember", featuring the cast of Cheers on the occasion of its 200th episode	Photograph	
1990-11-10	Susan Lucci of All My Children	Photograph	
1990-11-17	Miss Piggy, Kermit, and Bert and Ernie with Muppets creator Jim Henson; Inset: Andy Griffith of Matlock	Photograph	
1990-11-24	Linda Evans of I'll Take Romance; Inset: Malcolm-Jamal Warner of The Cosby Show	Photograph	
1990-12-01	"Viewers' Guide to the Holidays", featuring Dolly Parton; Chevy Chase of the film Christmas Vacation; and Jasmine Guy and Kadeem Hardison of A Different World with guest Patti LaBelle	Photo montage	
1990-12-08	David Coulier with Ashley and Mary-Kate Olsen of Full House	Photograph	
1990-12-15	Dixie Carter of Designing Women	Photograph	
1990-12-22	"How Hollywood Brings Our Comic-Book Heroes to Life", featuring Michael Keaton of the film Batman, John Wesley Shipp of the series The Flash, Warren Beatty of the film Dick Tracy	Photo montage	
1990-12-29	"New Year, New Season", featuring Charles Kimbrough, Candice Bergen, Joe Regalbuto, Robert Pastorelli, Faith Ford, Grant Shaud and Pat Corley of Murphy Brown	Photograph	

== 1991 ==
Issue date	Cover subject	Type of cover	Artist
1991-01-05	Jane Pauley of Real Life	Photograph	
1991-01-12	Farrah Fawcett and Ryan O'Neal of Good Sports	Photograph	
1991-01-19	Morley Safer, Harry Reasoner, Ed Bradley, and Mike Wallace of 60 Minutes	Illustration	
1991-01-26	* Cybill Shepherd of Which Way Home * Super Bowl XXV	*Shepherd: photograph *Super Bowl: illustration	
1991-02-02	"Fab Feb", featuring Grammy nominee MC Hammer, Gary Cole of Son of the Morning Star, and Barbara Walters Special guest Julia Roberts	Photo montage	
1991-02-09	Lucille Ball and Desi Arnaz	Photograph	
1991-02-16	"Watching The War", the effect of TV's coverage of Operation Desert Storm	Illustration	Schafle Inverso
1991-02-23	"TV's War Stars", featuring Arthur Kent of NBC News and CNN reporters Peter Arnett and Christiane Amanpour; Inset: Fred Rogers	Photo montage	
1991-03-02	"Parents' Guide to Children's Television", featuring Jaleel White of Family Matters and assorted cartoon characters	Photograph/illustration	White: Mario Casilli; cartoons: Bob Jones
1991-03-09	"Dreyfuss" the dog of Empty Nest; Inset: Fred Dryer of Hunter	Photograph	
1991-03-16	"Cartoons Grow Up", featuring Barbara Walters with the Ninja Turtles	Photograph	
1991-03-23	63rd Academy Awards preview, featuring nominees Whoopi Goldberg of Ghost, Kevin Costner of Dances with Wolves, and Julia Roberts of Pretty Woman	Illustration	
1991-03-30	Cheryl Ladd of Changes	Photograph	
1991-04-06	""Baseball TV Preview", featuring trading cards of Bo Jackson, Nolan Ryan, Roger Clemens, and Jose Canseco; Inset: "Lessons Learned From the Gulf War"	Photo montage	Jackson: Score Trading Cards; Ryan: Topps; Clemens: Donruss; Canseco: Fleer; Inset: United States Marine Corps
1991-04-13	"What's It Cost?" featuring Delta Burke of Designing Women	Photograph	Mario Casilli
1991-04-20	Burt Reynolds and Marilu Henner with baby of Evening Shade	Photograph	Mario Casilli
1991-04-27	May sweeps preview, featuring Earl Sinclair from Dinosaurs, Magic Johnson of the Los Angeles Lakers, and Patrick Bergin of Robin Hood	Photo montage	
1991-05-04	Larry Hagman of Dallas	Photograph	Mario Casilli
1991-05-11	John Spencer, Cecil Hoffman, Amanda Donohoe of L.A. Law	Photograph	
1991-05-18	Candice Bergen of Murphy Brown with guest stars Robin Thomas and Jay Thomas	Photograph	
1991-05-25	Summer Movie Preview, featuring 101 Dalmatians, Julia Roberts of Sleeping with the Enemy, and Arnold Schwarzenegger of Terminator 2: Judgment Day	Photo montage	
1991-06-01	"How Stars are Spending Their Summer Vacations", featuring Jasmine Guy of A Different World	Photograph	
1991-06-08	Michael Landon	Photograph	Curt Gunther
1991-06-15	"The 50 Best Videos to Watch Over and Over Again", featuring images from Mary Poppins, Casablanca, Star Wars Episode IV: A New Hope, Tootsie, & The Wizard of Oz	Photo montage	The Kobal Collection
1991-06-22	Gerald McRaney of Major Dad and Delta Burke	Photograph	
1991-06-29	"The Battle for Carson's Crown", featuring David Letterman, Arsenio Hall, Johnny Carson, and Jay Leno	Illustration	Ted Michener
1991-07-06	"The Best and The Worst: The TV year in review", featuring Baby Sinclair of Dinosaurs, Abraham Lincoln of The Civil War, Katie Couric of Today, an image from Lucy and Desi: Before the Laughter, and Roseanne Barr	Photo montage	
1991-07-13	* "What Michael Landon Meant To Us"	Photograph	
1991-07-20	"Michael Landon's Final Days"	Illustration	
1991-07-27	The 2000th Issue of TV Guide	Cover montage	
1991-08-03	"The MTV Revolution", featuring Madonna	Photograph	Lorraine Day
1991-08-10	"TV's Most Beautiful Women", featuring Candice Bergen, Jaclyn Smith, Vanna White	Photo montage	
1991-08-17	Home video preview, featuring Kevin Costner of the film Dances With Wolves and Macaulay Culkin of the film Home Alone	Illustration	
1991-08-24	Shannen Doherty of Beverly Hills, 90210	Photograph	
1991-08-31	Patrick Stewart of Star Trek: The Next Generation and William Shatner of Star Trek	Illustration	Kinuko Y. Craft
1991-09-07	Janine Turner of Northern Exposure	Photograph	
1991-09-14	Fall preview issue	Word art	Michael D. Radencich
1991-09-21	Jan Hooks and Julia Duffy of Designing Women	Photograph	
1991-09-28	"Parents Guide to the New Kids' Shows", featuring characters from Where's Waldo, Darkwing Duck, Doug, and Hammerman	Illustration	
1991-10-05	"The Best and Worst Dressed on TV", featuring Sharon Gless of The Trials of Rosie O'Neill and Arsenio Hall of The Arsenio Hall Show	Photograph	
1991-10-12	Jacqueline Kennedy Onassis, the subject of the miniseries A Woman Named Jackie	Photograph	Jacques Lowe
1991-10-19	Joan Collins and Linda Evans of Dynasty: The Reunion	Photograph	
1991-10-26	"Joan Rivers Before & After Nip & Tuck"	Photo montage	
1991-11-02	Michael Jackson on the occasion of his "Black or White" music video release	Photograph	
1991-11-09	"Is Network News Crumbling?" featuring anchors Tom Brokaw, Peter Jennings, and Dan Rather; Inset: Mary-Kate Olsen and Ashley Olsen of Full House	Illustration	Inset: photo by Ron Tom for Lorimar Productions
1991-11-16	Valerie Bertinelli of In a Child's Name	Photograph	
1991-11-23	Madonna	Photograph	
1991-11-30	Naomi Judd and Wynonna Judd	Photograph	
1991-12-07	Christmas TV preview, featuring Winnie the Pooh, Bob Hope, Mickey Mouse & Goofy, and Andy Rooney	Photo montage	
1991-12-14	Luke Perry and Jason Priestley of Beverly Hills, 90210	Photograph	
1991-12-21	John Corbett of Northern Exposure posing alongside a moosehead	Photograph	
1991-12-28	John Goodman of Roseanne	Photograph	

== 1992 ==
Issue date	Cover subject	Type of cover	Artist
1992-01-04	Roseanne as Lucy Ricardo	Photograph	
1992-01-11	Jane Fonda with a photo of Henry Fonda	Photograph	
1992-01-18	A grading of "TV's Top 20 Shows", featuring "Dreyfuss" the dog of Empty Nest	Photograph	
1992-01-25	"Your Number 1 Guide to Super Bowl XXVI"	Illustration	Peter Max
1992-02-01	Jessica Lange of Hallmark Hall of Fame's O Pioneers!	Photograph	
1992-02-08	1992 Winter Olympics preview, featuring Kristi Yamaguchi; Inset: Grant Shaud of Murphy Brown	Photograph	
1992-02-15	"What Makes TV Couples Click", featuring Regis Philbin and Kathie Lee Gifford of Live with Regis & Kathie Lee	Photograph	
1992-02-22	An investigation into "Fake News"; Insets: Grammy nominees Garth Brooks and Natalie Cole; Allison Doody and Benedict Taylor of Duel of Harts	Word art	Inset photos by E. J. Camp, Jeff Katz, and Danny Feld
1992-02-29	Corey Carrier of Young Indiana Jones	Photograph	
1992-03-07	"Parents' Guide to Kids' TV", featuring Macaulay Culkin	Photograph	Timothy Greenfield-Sanders/Onyx
1992-03-14	"Jane Pauley on Ice"	Illustration	Kinuko Y. Craft
1992-03-21	Magic Johnson and kids from his Nickelodeon special	Photograph	John Strauss for TV Guide
1992-03-28	Oscars preview, featuring the Beast from Beauty and the Beast	Illustration	Chris Notarile for TV Guide
1992-04-04	Ronn Moss & Katherine Kelly Lang of The Bold and the Beautiful	Photograph	Jeff Katz for TV Guide
1992-04-11	"Save Our Shows" recommendations Inset: Jay Leno	Word art	Leno: Mark Terrill for Wide World Photos
1992-04-18	Patricia Richardson and Tim Allen of Home Improvement	Photograph	Phillip Saltonstall for TV Guide
1992-04-25	Burt Reynolds of Evening Shade	Photograph	John Strauss for TV Guide
1992-05-02	Woody Harrelson and Jackie Swanson of Cheers	Photograph	
1992-05-09	Goodbye Johnny: Johnny Carson	Illustration	Chris Notarile for TV Guide
1992-05-16	Oprah Winfrey of Oprah: Behind the Scenes	Photograph	
1992-05-23	Jerry Seinfeld of Seinfeld	Photograph	Jeffery Newbury for TV Guide
1992-05-30	Dan Lauria, Alley Mills, Jason Hervey, and Fred Savage of The Wonder Years	Photograph	Jeffery Newbury for TV Guide
1992-06-06	Grant Show of Melrose Place; Inset:Drew Barrymore of 2000 Malibu Road	Photograph	
1992-06-13	Bob Saget of Full House	Photograph	
1992-06-20	"The Year's Best and Worst", featuring Ross Perot, Burt Reynolds and Michael Jeter of Evening Shade, Candice Bergen of Murphy Brown, Anita Hill, and Bette Midler and Johnny Carson from The Tonight Show	Photo montage	Reynolds & Jeter: Geraldine Overton/CBS; Bergen: Richard Cartwright/CBS; Midler & Carson: Alice S. Hall for NBC
1992-06-27	Phil Donahue	Photograph	
1992-07-04	Delta Burke of Delta	Photograph	Bob D'Amico for ABC
1992-07-11	Luke Perry and Shannen Doherty of Beverly Hills, 90210	Photograph	Jeff Katz for TV Guide
1992-07-18	"TV's Top Turn-ons", featuring Cindy Crawford of MTV and Patrick Stewart of Star Trek: The Next Generation	Photograph	
1992-07-25	1992 Summer Olympics preview, featuring gymnast Kim Zmeskal	Photograph	Nancy Raymond for International Gymnast
1992-08-01	Dana Carvey of Saturday Night Live and David Letterman of Late Night	Photo montage	
1992-08-08	The "soap opera" of Princess Diana and Prince Charles	Photo montage	
1992-08-15	"America Zaps! The All-Powerful Remote Control", featuring Whoopi Goldberg, Roseanne Arnold, Homer Simpson, Michelle Pfeiffer, & Ted Koppel	Illustration	Chris Notarile for TV Guide
1992-08-22	"Is TV Violence Battering Our Kids?"	Word art/photo montage	Dennis Mosner for TV Guide
1992-08-29	Roseanne	Photograph	
1992-09-05	Joan Lunden of Good Morning America	Photograph	
1992-09-12	Fall preview issue	Word art	Jeff Lynch
1992-09-19	Candice Bergen of Murphy Brown	Photograph	Theo Westenberger for TV Guide
1992-09-26	Country Music Association Awards preview, featuring Billy Ray Cyrus & Reba McEntire	Photograph	
1992-10-03	Bob Newhart of Bob	Illustration	
1992-10-10	"Would You Take $1 Million To Give Up TV Forever?"; Inset:Paul Reiser & Helen Hunt of Mad About Youand John Ritter & Markie Post of Hearts Afire	Word art	Jeff Katz
1992-10-17	"TV's Best Dressed", featuring Leeza Gibbons of Entertainment Tonight and Jay Leno of The Tonight Show	Photograph	Jeff Katz for TV Guide
1992-10-24	"Parents' Guide to New Kids' Shows", featuring Goofy & Max of Goof Troop; Inset: Kathie Lee Gifford of Live with Regis and Kathie Lee	Illustration	Goofy & Max: Willardson & Associates; Gifford: photo by James McGoon
1992-10-31	November sweeps preview, featuring Julia Roberts, Peter Falk of Columbo, Jaclyn Smith, and an image from E.T. the Extra-Terrestrial	Photo montage	Roberts: Everett Collection; Smith: Ron Tom for Universal; E.T.: Kobal Collection
1992-11-07	Frank Sinatra, with an inset of Philip Casnoff of the miniseries Sinatra	Photo montage	Casnoff: Albert Sanchez for TV Guide
1992-11-14	Michael Jackson	Photograph	
1992-11-21	Diane Sawyer of ABC News		
1992-11-28	John Ritter & Markie Post of Hearts Afire; Inset: Maggie and Bart Simpson of The Simpsons	Photograph	Simpsons: Bart Simpson by Matt Groening for 20th Century Fox
1992-12-05	John Stamos with Blake and Dylan Tuomy-Wilhoit of Full House	Photograph	
1992-12-12	Katey Sagal of Married... with Children	Photograph	
1992-12-19	Characters from Tiny Toon Adventures	Illustration	Warner Bros. Animation
1992-12-26	* Angela Lansbury of Murder, She Wrote * "The Year in Cheers & Jeers", featuring Madonna, Ted Danson of Cheers, and Michael Jordan (with Angela Lansbury in an inset)	Photo montage	Madonna: Steven Meisel; Danson: from TV Guide archives

== 1993 ==
Issue date	Cover subject	Type of cover	Artist
1993-01-02	Patrick Stewart of Star Trek: The Next Generation and Avery Brooks of Star Trek: Deep Space Nine on the week of the latter series' debut	Photograph	
1993-01-09	Bill & Hillary Clinton	Photograph	
1993-01-16	"How to Be a Funny President", featuring Saturday Night Live's Dana Carvey as "George H. W. Bush" and Phil Hartman as "Bill Clinton"	Photograph	Jeff Katz for TV Guide
1993-01-23	Will Smith of The Fresh Prince of Bel Air	Photograph	Marc Bryan-Brown for TV Guide
1993-01-30	Craig T. Nelson of Coach	Photograph	Jeff Katz for TV Guide
1993-02-06	Katie Couric of Today	Photograph	
1993-02-13	Billy Ray Cyrus	Photograph	George Lange for TV Guide
1993-02-20	Jane Seymour of Dr. Quinn, Medicine Woman	Photograph	George Lange for TV Guide
1993-02-27	"Parents' Guide to Kids' TV", featuring Jane Pauley & Barney	Photograph	Marc Bryan-Brown for TV Guide
1993-03-06	Regis Philbin of Live with Regis & Kathie Lee; Inset: Cher	Photograph	Marc Bryan-Brown for TV Guide
1993-03-13	Mary Tyler Moore of Stolen Babies	Photograph	
1993-03-20	Antonio Sabato, Jr. of General Hospital and Hunter Tylo of The Bold and the Beautiful	Photograph	
1993-03-27	Billy Crystal & "friends"	Photograph	
1993-04-03	Heather Locklear of Melrose Place	Photograph	Jeff Katz for TV Guide
1993-04-10	Ted Danson of Cheers; Inset: Shelley Long	Photograph	Paul Drinkwater/NBC
1993-04-17	TV Guide's 40th Anniversary Issue	Word art	
1993-04-24	Patricia Richardson and Tim Allen of Home Improvement	Photograph	
1993-05-01	Michele Lee, Joan Van Ark, and Nicollette Sheridan of Knots Landing; Inset: Donna Mills	Photograph	
1993-05-08	Arsenio Hall of The Arsenio Hall Show; Inset: Tori Spelling of Beverly Hills 90210	Photograph	Jeff Katz for TV Guide
1993-05-15	Kirstie Alley, Ted Danson, Woody Harrelson, Rhea Perlman, Kelsey Grammer, John Ratzenberger, and George Wendt of Cheers on the week of the series' finale (fold-out cover)	Photograph	
1993-05-22	Linda Ellerbee of Nick News	Photograph	
1993-05-29	Richard Simmons	Photograph	Timothy White
1993-06-05	Connie Chung of CBS Evening News	Photograph	Tony Esparza for CBS
1993-06-12	"Summerwatch Top 10 Issue", featuring Joey Lawrence of Blossom	Photograph	Jeff Katz for TV Guide
1993-06-19	A Martinez of L.A. Law with his son, Cody; Inset: The cast of Little House on the Prairie, one of TV Guide readers' choices for all-time favorites	Photograph	
1993-06-26	Cindy Crawford, Lauren Hutton, Naomi Campbell, and Beverly Johnson; Inset: Marge Simpson of The Simpsons sporting a Hillary Clinton hair styling	Photograph	Frank Micelotta for MTV
1993-07-03	Vanna White of Wheel of Fortune	Photograph	
1993-07-10	Larry Hagman of Staying Afloat	Photograph	Jeffery Newbury for TV Guide
1993-07-17	"Hot-Blooded Hollywood", featuring Julia Roberts and Lyle Lovett	Photograph	
1993-07-24	"Summer Sci-Fi Issue", featuring Armin Shimerman of Star Trek: Deep Space Nine	Photograph	Jeff Katz for TV Guide
1993-07-31	Patrick Stewart of Star Trek: The Next Generation	Photograph	
1993-08-07	Mary-Kate Olsen and Ashley Olsen of Full House	Photograph	Jeffery Newbury for TV Guide
1993-08-14	"The Furor Over R-Rated Network TV"	Photograph	William Duke for TV Guide
1993-08-21	Loni Anderson	Photograph	
1993-08-28	"Late Night Star Wars", featuring Jay Leno, Chevy Chase, David Letterman, Ted Koppel, Conan O'Brien, and Arsenio Hall (fold-out cover)	Illustration	John Kascht
1993-09-04	William Shatner of Star Trek	Photograph	
1993-09-11	Kelsey Grammer of Frasier	Photograph	Jeffery Newbury for TV Guide
1993-09-18	Fall Preview Issue	Word art	
1993-09-25	*Wynonna Judd & Clint Black; *Remembering Raymond Burr (with Judd and Black in an inset)	Photograph	*Judd & Black: by Jeff Katz for TV Guide
1993-10-02	Victoria Principal of River of Rage	Photograph	Jeff Katz for TV Guide
1993-10-09	Harry Anderson of Dave's World; Inset: John Larroquette of The John Larroquette Show	Photograph	Jeffery Newbury for TV Guide
1993-10-16	Anthony Geary and Genie Francis of General Hospital	Photograph	
1993-10-23	"Best and Worst Dressed" issue, featuring Kelly Rutherford of The Adventures of Brisco County, Jr., Paula Poundstone of The Paula Poundstone Show, Jason Alexander of Seinfeld, & Faye Dunaway of It Had to Be You	Photograph	Poundstone: ABC, Alexander: George Lange for NBC
1993-10-30	"TV That's Good For Your Kids", featuring Bert and Ernie of Sesame Street	Photograph	Marc Bryan-Brown for TV Guide
1993-11-06	Mike Wallace of 60 Minutes	Photograph	Steve Hill for TV Guide
1993-11-13	Hillary Clinton & Big Bird; Inset: Mariah Carey	Photograph	Clinton/Big Bird: Marc Bryan-Brown for TV Guide
1993-11-20	Richard Thomas, Ralph Waite, & Michael Learned of A Walton Thanksgiving Reunion	Photograph	Theo Westenberger for TV Guide
1993-11-27	Dolly Parton	Photograph	Dolly Parton Inc.
1993-12-04	"Holiday Viewing Guide", featuring The Grinch and Max the dog of How the Grinch Stole Christmas, a scene from It's A Wonderful Life, Will Smith of The Fresh Prince of Bel-Air, and Jennie Garth of Beverly Hills, 90210	Photo montage	Grinch & Max: John Hazard; Life: RHI Entertainment; Smith: Chris Haston for NBC; Garth: Andrew Semel for Fox
1993-12-11	Bette Midler of Gypsy; Inset: Daryl Hannah of Attack of the 50 Ft. Woman	Photograph	Midler: Greg Gorman; Hannah: Michael Ferguson for Globe Photos
1993-12-18	"Our 40th Anniversary Show", featuring hosts Heather Locklear, Robert Wagner, and Lindsay Wagner with a montage of stars including Adam West of Batman; Candice Bergen of Murphy Brown; Jackie Gleason; Jean Stapleton and Carroll O'Connor of All in the Family; Mary Tyler Moore and Dick Van Dyke of The Dick Van Dyke Show; Leonard Nimoy of Star Trek; Kate Jackson, Farrah Fawcett, & Jaclyn Smith of Charlie's Angels; Carol Burnett; Jerry Seinfeld of Seinfeld; Don Johnson of Miami Vice; Johnny Carson of The Tonight Show; Larry Hagman of Dallas; Sonny Bono & Cher; Lucille Ball; and Don Adams and Barbara Feldon of Get Smart	Photo montage	Locklear/Wagner/Wagner: Jeff Katz for TV Guide; Gleason: Martin Mills; Stapleton/O'Connor, Burnett, and Hagman: TV Guide Archives; Moore/Van Dyke and Adams/Feldon: Ivan Nagy; Nimoy: Ken Whitmore; Angels: Dick Zimmerman; Seinfeld: Chris Haston for NBC; Johnson: Douglas Keeve; Sonny & Cher: Sherman Weisburd; Ball: Philippe Halsman
1993-12-25	Kennedy Center Honoree Johnny Carson	Illustration	Drew Struzan

== 1994 ==
Issue date	Cover subject	Type of cover	Artist
1/1/1994	Tim Allen of Home Improvement	Photograph	Jeff Katz for TV Guide
1994-01-08	David Caruso of NYPD Blue	Photograph	Jeff Katz for TV Guide
1994-01-15	Avery Brooks of Star Trek: Deep Space Nine	Photograph	Jeff Katz for TV Guide
1994-01-22	"Winter Preview", featuring Henry Winkler of Monty; Dan Cortese of Traps; Ellen DeGeneres of These Friends of Mine; Ed Begley Jr. of Winnetka Road; and Tim Reid, Tamera Mowry, Tia Mowry, & Jackee Harry of Sister, Sister	Photo montage	Sister, Sister: Bob D'Amico for ABC
1994-01-29	"Super Bowl SuperGuide", featuring Valerie Bertinelli of Cafe Americain in a football-themed photo	Photograph	Jeff Katz for TV Guide
1994-02-05	Courtney Thorne-Smith and Heather Locklear of Melrose Place; Inset: Fabio	Photo montage	Thorne-Smith: Albert Sanchez; Locklear: Jeff Jatz; Fabio: Jeffery Newbury
1994-02-12	1994 Winter Olympics preview, featuring American figure skater Nancy Kerrigan	Photograph	Nancie Battaglia
1994-02-19	British Ice dancers Jayne Torvill and Christopher Dean; Inset: Cybill Shepherd	Photograph	
1994-02-26	Whitney Houston	Photograph	
1994-03-05	Dennis Franz and "Caesar" the dog of NYPD Blue	Photograph	Timothy White
1994-03-12	"Parents' Guide to Kids' TV", featuring Erin Davis of The Sinbad Show	Photograph	
1994-03-19	Academy Awards preview, featuring Oscar emcee Whoopi Goldberg and ABC's Barbara Walters	Photo montage	Walters: Theo Westenberger; Goldberg: Jeffery Newbury
1994-03-26	Diane Sawyer of ABC News	Photograph	
1994-04-02	Loni Anderson	Photograph	
1994-04-09	Kirstie Alley of David's Mother	Photograph	
1994-04-16	Nicollette Sheridan of A Time to Heal	Photograph	Jeff Katz for TV Guide
1994-04-23	Jason Alexander of Seinfeld	Photograph	Jeffery Newbury for TV Guide
1994-04-30	Garth Brooks of the special This is Garth Brooks, Too!	Photograph	
1994-05-07	Rob Lowe and Laura San Giacomo of Stephen King's The Stand	Photograph	Jeffery Newbury for TV Guide
1994-05-14	The cast of Star Trek: The Next Generation	Photo montage	
1994-05-21	Farrah Fawcett of The Substitute Wife; Inset: Carol Burnett	Photograph	Jeff Katz for TV Guide
1994-05-28	Andrew Shue of Melrose Place	Photograph	
1994-06-04	Elizabeth Taylor	Photograph	
1994-06-11	"The Best and Worst of the Year in TV", featuring David Caruso of NYPD Blue, Laura Leighton of Melrose Place, Brett Butler of Grace Under Fire, and Madonna from her appearance on Late Show with David Letterman	Photo montage	Madonna: Patrick Pagnano for CBS
1994-06-18	"TV’s Top Dogs", featuring Frasier’s "Eddie" and Mad About You's "Murray"	Photograph	
1994-06-25	A ranking of "Hollywood's Best-Loved Stars", featuring Jane Seymour of Doctor Quinn, Medicine Woman, Tim Allen of Home Improvement, and Jay Leno of The Tonight Show	Photo montage	
1994-07-02	* Reba McEntire of Is There Life Out There? * Gillian Anderson and David Duchovny of The X-Files (with Reba McEntire in an inset)	Photograph	
1994-07-09	Red Ranger of Mighty Morphin Power Rangers	Photograph	Jeff Katz for TV Guide
1994-07-16	Cindy Crawford of House of Style	Photograph	Deborah Feingold for TV Guide
1994-07-23	Oprah Winfrey	Photograph	Simon Kreitem
1994-07-30	The O. J. Simpson murder case	Photo illustration	Mark Malabrigo for TV Guide
1994-08-06	Paul Reiser of Mad About You	Photograph	Jeff Katz for TV Guide
1994-08-13	Alexandra Paul, Pamela Anderson, David Hasselhoff, and Yasmine Bleeth of Baywatch	Photograph	
1994-08-20	Barbra Streisand	Illustration	John Kascht for TV Guide
1994-08-27	David Letterman of Late Show	Photograph	Christopher Little
1994-09-03	"The NFL Now"(7 covers): * Troy Aikman of the Dallas Cowboys * John Elway of the Denver Broncos * Dan Marino of the Miami Dolphins * Joe Montana of the Kansas City Chiefs * Barry Sanders of the Detroit Lions * Thurman Thomas of the Buffalo Bills * John Madden of Fox Sports	Photograph	Madden: Bill Reitzel for TV Guide
1994-09-10	"Emmy Uproar", featuring Tim Allen of Home Improvement and David Caruso of NYPD Blue	Photograph	
1994-09-17	Fall Preview	Word art	
1994-09-24	John Mahoney, David Hyde Pierce, Kelsey Grammer, & "Eddie" the dog of Frasier	Photograph	Jeff Katz for TV Guide
1994-10-01	Christie Brinkley, host of Ford's Supermodel of the World 1994	Photograph	
1994-10-08	Kate Mulgrew of Star Trek: Voyager	Photograph	Jeff Katz for TV Guide
1994-10-15	Melissa Gilbert of Sweet Justice	Photograph	
1994-10-22	Suzanne Somers of Step by Step; Inset: Jay Leno of The Tonight Show	Photograph	Jeff Katz for TV Guide
1994-10-29	"Parents' Guide to Kids' TV", featuring the Mighty Morphin Power Rangers	Photograph	
1994-11-05	Shannen Doherty of The Margaret Mitchell Story	Photograph	Albert Sanchez for TV Guide
1994-11-12	Joanne Whalley-Kilmer and Timothy Dalton of Scarlett	Photograph	Bob Green for RHI
1994-11-19	Sherry Stringfield, Anthony Edwards, and Noah Wyle of ER	Photograph	Jeff Katz for TV Guide
1994-11-26	Ellen DeGeneres of Ellen	Photograph	Jeffery Newbury for TV Guide
1994-12-03	"Holiday Viewing Guide", featuring Crystal Bernard of Wings	Photograph	Jeffery Newbury for TV Guide
1994-12-10	Jane Pauley of Dateline NBC; Inset: Matthew Fox and Scott Wolf of Party of Five	Photograph	Pauley: Deborah Feingold; Fox and Wolf: Jeffery Newbury
1994-12-17	Kathie Lee Gifford of Looking for Christmas	Photograph	Michael O'Neill for TV Guide
1994-12-24	"The Year in Cheers & Jeers", featuring Roseanne of Roseanne, Dorothy Letterman of Late Show with David Letterman, and Burt Reynolds of Evening Shade	Photo montage	Roseanne: AP/Wide World; Letterman: Mary Ann Carter for CBS
1994-12-31	"Viewers' Guide to College Bowls", 7 covers featuring Joe Paterno, Kerry Collins, Lawrence Phillips, Danny O'Neil, Danny Wuerffel, Danny Kanell, Jay Barker, Joey Galloway, Lou Holtz, Ron Powlus, Rashaan Salaam, and Frank Costa	Photo montage	

== 1995 ==
Issue date	Cover subject	Type of cover	Artist
1995-01-07	Oprah Winfrey of The Oprah Winfrey Show	Photograph	Paul Elledge for TV Guide
1995-01-14	Kate Mulgrew, Tim Russ, and Robert Beltran of Star Trek: Voyager	Photograph	Jeff Katz for TV Guide
1995-01-21	"Winter Preview", featuring Shawn & Marlon Wayans of The Wayans Bros., Delta Burke of Women of the House, Richard Grieco of Marker, John Leguizamo of House of Buggin', and Julia Campbell of A Whole New Ballgame	Photo montage	Wayans Bros.: Warner Bros.; Burke: Bill Reitzel; Grieco: Jeff Katz for UPN; Leguizamo: Michael Levine for Fox; Campbell: Jeffery Newbury
1995-01-28	"Super Bowl Spectacular"	Illustration	Steve Krongard for TV Guide
1995-02-04	Jerry Seinfeld of Seinfeld; Inset: Roseanne of Roseanne	Photograph	Frank W. Ockenfels III for TV Guide
1995-02-11	Heather Locklear of Texas Justice	Photograph	Davis Factor for TV Guide
1995-02-18	Sally Field of A Woman of Independent Means	Photograph	Bill Reitzel for TV Guide
1995-02-25	George Clooney of ER	Photograph	Jeffery Newbury for TV Guide
1995-03-04	"Parents' Guide to Kids' TV", featuring Genie of Aladdin, Blue Ranger of Mighty Morphin Power Rangers & Beast of X-Men	Photo montage	Alladin: Buena Vista Television; X-Men: Saban Entertainment
1995-03-11	Gillian Anderson & David Duchovny of The X-Files	Photograph	Karen Moskowitz for TV Guide
1995-03-18	"TV's 10 Most Powerful Stars", featuring Roseanne, Tim Allen, Oprah Winfrey, & Jerry Seinfeld	Photo montage	Winfrey: Paul Elledge; Seinfeld: Frank W. Ockenfels III
1995-03-25	Academy Awards preview, featuring emcee David Letterman	Photograph	Christopher Little for ABC
1995-04-01	"Are Talk Shows Out of Control?" featuring Jenny Jones, Jerry Springer, Ricki Lake, & Montel Williams	Photo montage	Lake: Marc Bryan-Brown; Williams: Steve Hill
1995-04-08	Jennie Garth of Beverly Hills, 90210	Photograph	Jeffery Newbury for TV Guide
1995-04-15	Fran Drescher of The Nanny	Photograph	Jeff Katz for TV Guide
1995-04-22	Susan Lucci of Seduced and Betrayed	Photograph	Deborah Feingold for TV Guide
1995-04-29	"Invasion of the Prime-time Boss Ladies", featuring Courtney Thorne-Smith of Melrose Place, Roxanne Hart of Chicago Hope, & Kate Mulgrew of Star Trek: Voyager	Photograph	
1995-05-06	Jane Seymour and Joe Lando of Dr. Quinn, Medicine Woman	Photograph	Bill Reitzel for TV Guide
1995-05-13	Naomi, Wyonna, and Ashley Judd	Photograph	
1995-05-20	Gail O'Grady and Sharon Lawrence of NYPD Blue	Photograph	
1995-05-27	Pamela Anderson of Baywatch	Photograph	
1995-06-03	Larry King of Larry King Live; Inset: Connie Chung	Photograph	Katherine Lambert for TV Guide
1995-06-10	"Summer Preview", featuring George Clooney, Barry White, David Charvet, Barbara Mandrell, Lisa Marie Presley & Michael Jackson, and an image from the film Pocahontas	Photo montage	Pocahontas: Walt Disney Pictures; Presley/Jackson: Jonathan Exley for ABC
1995-06-17	Brett Butler of Grace Under Fire; Inset: Bryant Gumbel of Today	Photograph	Richard Corman for TV Guide
1995-06-24	Jason David Frank of Mighty Morphin Power Rangers	Photograph	Bill Reitzel for TV Guide
1995-07-01	Victoria Principal in Dancing in the Dark	Photograph	
1995-07-08	Cal Ripken Jr. of the Baltimore Orioles; Inset: The rage over "May–December Romances", featuring Jerry Seinfeld & Shoshanna Lonstein	Photograph	Ripken Jr.: Focus on Sports; Seinfeld/Lonstein: Kevin Winter for Celebrity Photo
1995-07-15	Jennifer Lien and Ethan Phillips of Star Trek: Voyager	Photograph	Philip Saltonstall for TV Guide
1995-07-22	Dean Cain of Lois & Clark	Photograph	Karen Moskowitz for TV Guide
1995-07-29	Josie Bissett of Melrose Place	Photograph	
1995-08-05	Tom Selleck of Broken Trust	Photograph	Jeffery Newbury for TV Guide
1995-08-12	"Best Dressed Stars!" featuring Cybill Shepherd of Cybill and Jimmy Smits of NYPD Blue	Photograph	Karen Moskowitz for TV Guide
1995-08-19	Regis Philbin	Photograph	Carol Friedman for TV Guide
1995-08-26	* Tiffani-Amber Thiessen and Brian Austin Green of Beverly Hills, 90210 * Southeastern Conference football preview(4 regional covers)	Photograph	Theissen/Green: Bill Reitzel for TV Guide
1995-09-02	1995 NFL season preview(24 regional covers)	Photograph	
1995-09-09	Emmy Awards preview, featuring Paul Reiser of Mad About You, Kelsey Grammer of Frasier, and Garry Shandling of The Larry Sanders Show; Inset: Candice Bergen of Murphy Brown with guest star John F. Kennedy Jr.	Photograph	Emmy: Karen Moskowitz for TV Guide; Bergen/Kennedy: Byron J. Cohen for CBS
1995-09-16	Fall Preview	Word art	Studio Macbeth
1995-09-23	Lisa Kudrow, David Schwimmer, Jennifer Aniston, Matt LeBlanc, Courteney Cox, & Matthew Perry of Friends	Photograph	
1995-09-30	Mary McCormack, Daniel Benzali, & Jason Gedrick of Murder One	Photograph	Davis Factor/Visages for TV Guide
1995-10-07	Avery Brooks & Michael Dorn of Star Trek: Deep Space Nine	Photograph	Darryl Estrine for TV Guide
1995-10-14	George Clooney & Julianna Margulies of ER	Photograph	Lance Staedler for TV Guide
1995-10-21	Andrew, Matthew, & Joey Lawrence of Brotherly Love; Inset: Mary Tyler Moore of New York News	Photograph	Lawrence Brothers: Darryl Estrine for TV Guide
1995-10-28	Sarah "Fergie" Ferguson, the Duchess of York	Photograph	
1995-11-04	Brooke Shields of Nothing Lasts Forever	Photograph	Alberto Tolot for TV Guide
1995-11-11	Oprah Winfrey	Photograph	Chris Sanders for TV Guide
1995-11-18	"Beatles '95", featuring John Lennon, Paul McCartney, George Harrison, & Ringo Starr in a recreation of the Sgt. Pepper's Lonely Hearts Club Band album cover	Photo illustration	Peter Blake for TV Guide
1995-11-25	Jane Seymour of Dr. Quinn, Medicine Woman	Photograph	Diego Uchitel for TV Guide
1995-12-02	"Holiday Viewing Guide", featuring Téa Leoni of The Naked Truth	Photograph	
1995-12-09	Matthew Fox, Scott Wolf, & Neve Campbell of Party of Five; Inset: Martha Stewart	Photograph	Stewart: Jesse Frohman
1995-12-16	Kathie Lee Gifford of Live with Regis & Kathie Lee with children Cody & Cassidy; Inset: Howard Stern	Photograph	Giffords: Deborah Feingold for TV Guide
1995-12-23	"The Big Hair Issue", featuring Lisa Kudrow of Friends and, in insets, Jennifer Aniston, Lorenzo Lamas, Heather Locklear, and Daniel Benzali	Photograph	Kudrow: Diego Uchitel for TV Guide; Aniston: Andrew Eccles for NBC; Lamas: Genesis Entertainment; Locklear: Diego Uchitel for Fox; Benzali: Bill Reitzel
1995-12-30	* "Viewers' Guide to College Bowls"(7 covers) * James Brown of the Texas Longhorns * Darnell Autry of the Northwestern Wildcats with coach Gary Barnett	Bowls: photo montage; Brown: photograph; Autry/Barnett: photograph	

== 1996 ==
Issue date	Cover subject	Type of cover	Artist
1996-01-06	"The Best (and the worst) of '95", featuring Jerry Seinfeld, Oprah Winfrey, David Schwimmer, & Cybill Shepherd	Photo montage	
1996-01-13	Morgan Fairchild of The City	Photograph	
1996-01-20	"Sci-Fi & Fantasy Issue", featuring Lucy Lawless and Kevin Sorbo of Hercules: The Legendary Journeys, William Shatner, and cast members from Space: Above & Beyond	Photo montage	
1996-01-27	Super Bowl XXX preview, featuring quarterbacks Troy Aikman of the Dallas Cowboys and Neil O'Donnell of the Pittsburgh Steelers	Photo montage	
1996-02-03	Ted Danson and Mary Steenburgen of Gulliver's Travels	Photograph	
1996-02-10	David Schwimmer and Jennifer Aniston of Friends	Photograph	
1996-02-17	John de Lancie and Kate Mulgrew of Star Trek: Voyager; Inset: Julia Louis-Dreyfus of Seinfeld	Photograph	
1996-02-24	Tori Spelling of Beverly Hills, 90210	Photograph	
1996-03-02	Jimmy Smits and Dennis Franz of NYPD Blue	Photograph	
1996-03-09	"50 Greatest Things About Television Now"	Word art	
1996-03-16	"Parents' Guide to Kids' TV", featuring Billy Crystal with Muppets Animal, Kermit, & Gonzo	Photograph	
1996-03-23	Oscars preview, featuring Sharon Stone of Casino, Mel Gibson of Braveheart, Brad Pitt of 12 Monkeys, and "Babe" the pig of Babe	Photo montage	Pitt: David Fisher/London Features; Babe: Carolyn Jones/Universal City Studios
1996-03-30	Joan Lunden of Good Morning America	Photograph	
1996-04-06	Gillian Anderson and David Duchovny of The X-Files	Photograph	
1996-04-13	* Anthony Edwards of ER * Stanley Cup preview, featuring Wayne Gretzky, Mario Lemieux, Eric Lindros, and Steve Yzerman(4 separate covers)	Photograph	
1996-04-20	Cybill Shepherd of Cybill	Photograph	
1996-04-27	Morley Safer, Ed Bradley, Mike Wallace, Lesley Stahl, Steve Kroft, & Andy Rooney of 60 Minutes	Photograph	Darryl Estrine
1996-05-04	Whitney Houston, host of The Kids’ Choice Awards on Nickelodeon	Photograph	
1996-05-11	Tom Selleck & Courteney Cox of Friends	Photograph	
1996-05-18	Candice Bergen of Murphy Brown	Photograph	
1996-05-25	Heather Locklear of Melrose Place	Photograph	
1996-06-01	Jerry Seinfeld of Seinfeld	Photograph	Stephen Danelian for TV Guide
1996-06-08	Jenny McCarthy of Singled Out	Photograph	
1996-06-15	Teri Hatcher of Lois & Clark	Photograph	
1996-06-22	Conan O'Brien	Photograph	Stephen Danelian for TV Guide
1996-06-29	"100 Most Memorable Moments In TV History", featuring The Beatles & Ed Sullivan; Muhammad Ali & George Foreman; Richard Nixon; the cast of Bonanza; and Anthony Geary & Genie Francis of General Hospital	Photo montage	
1996-07-06	Gillian Anderson of The X-Files	Photograph	
1996-07-13	"What Happened to Family TV?" featuring an archived photo of Jerry Mathers and Barbara Billingsley from Leave It to Beaver	Photograph	Garrett-Howard
1996-07-20	1996 Summer Olympics viewing guide, featuring US swimmer Janet Evans	Photograph	
1996-07-27	US Olympic women's basketball team members Lisa Leslie, Rebecca Lobo, and Dawn Staley	Photograph	
1996-08-03	"TV's Best and Worst Dressed", featuring Dean Cain of Lois and Clark and Jennie Garth of Beverly Hills, 90210	Photograph	
1996-08-10	"Stars We Still Love", featuring Maureen McCormick, Barbara Feldon, and Chad Everett	Photograph	Karen Moskowitz for TV Guide
1996-08-17	Matthew Perry of Friends	Photograph	Jeffery Newbury for TV Guide
1996-08-24	The 30th birthday of Star Trek, featuring William Shatner, Patrick Stewart, Kate Mulgrew, and Avery Brooks on 4 separate covers	Photograph	Shatner, Mulgrew, and Brooks: Greg Lavy for TV Guide; Stewart: Paramount Television
1996-08-31	* 1996 NFL season preview(26 regional covers) * Drew Carey of The Drew Carey Show(Cleveland area)	Photograph	
1996-09-07	Helen Hunt and Paul Reiser of Mad About You	Photograph	Greg Lavy for TV Guide
1996-09-14	Fall Preview	Word art	
1996-09-21	"Returning Favorites" issue, featuring Cybill Shepherd of Cybill, Brandy Norwood of Moesha, Teri Hatcher of Lois & Clark, Gillian Anderson and David Duchovny of The X-Files, Jerry Seinfeld of Seinfeld, and the cast of Party of Five	Photo montage	
1996-09-28	Michael J. Fox of Spin City	Photograph	
1996-10-05	* Jay Leno of The Tonight Show * "Baseball Playoff Preview"(10 regional covers)	Photograph	Leno: Mark Hanauer
1996-10-12	Robyn Lively, Shannon Sturges, & Jamie Luner of Savannah	Photograph	Cathrine Wessel for TV Guide
1996-10-19	* Brooke Shields of Suddenly Susan * Presidential candidates Bill Clinton and Bob Dole(separate covers)	Photograph	
1996-10-26	"Parents' Guide to Kids' TV", featuring the Rugrats	Illustration	
1996-11-02	Michael Jordan of the Chicago Bulls	Photograph	
1996-11-09	Robert Urich	Photograph	Fergus Greer for TV Guide
1996-11-16	Lance Henriksen of Millennium	Photograph	
1996-11-23	Carey Lowell of Law & Order and Kyle Chandler of Early Edition	Photograph	
1996-11-30	Roma Downey of Touched by an Angel	Photograph	
1996-12-07	* Kathy Kinney & Drew Carey of The Drew Carey Show * Selena	Photograph	
1996-12-14	"50 Greatest TV Stars of All Time", featuring Michael Landon, Roseanne, Carroll O'Connor, Bill Cosby, Mary Tyler Moore, Lassie, and Jackie Gleason	Photo montage	Landon: Curt gunther: Roseanne: Bob D'Amico for ABC; Cosby: TV Guide Archives; Moore: Peter Sorel
1996-12-21	David Duchovny of The X-Files(2 covers)	Photograph	David Lavy
1996-12-28	* Michelle Forbes, Andre Braugher, and Kyle Secor of Homicide: Life on the Street; *College Bowl Preview(9 covers) ** Dameyune Craig of the Auburn Tigers and Kevin Jackson of the Alabama Crimson Tide ** Jake Plummer of the Arizona State Sun Devils ** Steve Sarkisian of the Brigham Young Cougars; **Coach Steve Spurrier of the Florida Gators ** Warrick Dunn of the Florida State Seminoles with coach Bobby Bowden ** Pat Fitzgerald of the Northwestern Wildcats with coach Gary Barnett ** Pepe Pearson of the Ohio State Buckeyes; **Coach Joe Paterno of the Penn State Nittany Lions ** Peyton Manning of the Tennessee Volunteers	Photograph (Craig/Jackson: photo montage)	

== 1997 ==
Issue date	Cover subject	Type of cover	Artist
1997-01-04	"The Best Of ’96", featuring "Performer of the Year" Oprah Winfrey	Photograph	
1997-01-11	Dilbert	Illustration	
1997-01-18	Winter Preview	Word art	Tom Nikosey for TV Guide
1997-01-25	Super Bowl XXXI preview (6 covers) * Brett Favre of the Green Bay Packers and Drew Bledsoe of the New England Patriots * Tony Boselli and Natrone Means of the Jacksonville Jaguars (separate covers) * Reggie White of the Green Bay Packers * Drew Bledsoe and Curtis Martin of the New England Patriots (separate covers)	Photograph (Favre/Bledsoe: photo montage)	
1997-02-01	Kevin Sorbo of Hercules: The Legendary Journeys	Photograph	
1997-02-08	Neve Campbell of Party of Five	Photograph	
1997-02-15	* David Letterman of Late Show with Radio City Rockettes Beth Woods Nolan, Lillian Colon and Susan Heart * NASCAR drivers Dale Earnhardt, Jeff Gordon, Dale Jarrett, and Terry Labonte (separate covers)	Photograph	
1997-02-22	Chuck Norris of Walker, Texas Ranger	Photograph	
1997-03-01	John Lithgow, Kristen Johnston, French Stewart, Jane Curtin, and Joseph Gordon-Levitt of 3rd Rock from the Sun (fold-out cover)	Photograph	Greg Lavy for TV Guide
1997-03-08	* Howard Stern * Ekaterina Gordeeva	Photograph	
1997-03-15	"Parents' Guide to Kids TV", featuring Elmo of Sesame Street	Photograph	
1997-03-22	"Oscar Preview", featuring nominees Tom Cruise, Kristin Scott Thomas, Barbara Hershey, & Woody Harrelson	Photo montage	Thomas: Everett Collection; Harrelson: Sidney Baldwin for Columbia/TriStar
1997-03-29	"God and Television"	Illustration	
1997-04-05	* Rosie O'Donnell of The Rosie O'Donnell Show * Stanley Cup Playoff Preview, featuring players Dominik Hašek, Mario Lemieux, Eric Lindros, Andy Moog, Patrick Roy, Brendan Shanahan, Keith Tkachuk, and John Vanbiesbrouck (separate covers)	Photograph	O'Donnell: Michael Daks for TV Guide
1997-04-12	NBA Playoff Preview, featuring Michael Jordan, Hakeem Olajuwon, Grant Hill, Kevin Garnett, Eddie Jones, Tim Hardaway, Gary Payton, Dikembe Mutombo, Patrick Ewing, & John Stockton (fold-out cover)	Photograph	
1997-04-19	"The Big Hair Issue", featuring Jenny McCarthy of MTV	Photograph	
1997-04-26	Tom Hanks	Photograph	
1997-05-03	* Lucy Lawless of Xena: Warrior Princess * Kentucky Derby and Triple Crown Preview", featuring jockey Shane Sellers aboard Pulpit	Photograph	Lawless: Gary Heery for TV Guide
1997-05-10	* Kate Mulgrew of Star Trek: Voyager * Adam Arkin, Christine Lahti, and Mark Harmon of Chicago Hope	Photograph	
1997-05-17	Gillian Anderson, David Duchovny, Nicholas Lea, Mitch Pileggi, William B. Davis, Dean Haglund, Bruce Harwood, Tom Braidwood, and series creator Chris Carter of The X-Files(fold-out cover)	Photograph	
1997-05-24	"20 Great Faces", featuring Kim Delaney of NYPD Blue	Photograph	
1997-05-31	Michael Richards of Seinfeld	Photograph	James Minchin for TV Guide
1997-06-07	* Farrah Fawcett on her 50th birthday * LeAnn Rimes * Rod Brindamour and John LeClair of the Philadelphia Flyers * Mike Vernon and Slava Kozlov of the Detroit Red Wings	Photograph	
1997-06-14	"Punch Up Your Workout", featuring Lea Thompson of Caroline in the City	Photograph	
1997-06-21	Joan Lunden of Good Morning America	Photograph	
1997-06-28	"100 Greatest Episodes of All Time"	Text graphic	
1997-07-05	"Summer Sci-Fi Special", featuring Claudia Christian, Bruce Boxleitner, and Jerry Doyle of Babylon 5	Photograph	Michael Tighe for TV Guide
1997-07-12	"Animation's New Wave", featuring Hank Hill of King of the Hill and the title characters of Daria and Dr. Katz, Professional Therapist	Illustration	
1997-07-19	Kathie Lee Gifford of Live with Regis & Kathie Lee	Photograph	
1997-07-26	Jennifer Aniston of Friends	Photograph	
1997-08-02	* Sarah Michelle Gellar of Buffy the Vampire Slayer * NASCAR driver Jeff Gordon	Photograph	
1997-08-09	"TV's Best (and Worst!) Dressed Stars", featuring Jennifer Love Hewitt of Party of Five and French Stewart of 3rd Rock from the Sun	Photograph	
1997-08-16	Elvis Presley, on the 20th anniversary of his death(4 covers)	Photograph	
1997-08-23	* "Look What They've Done to Miss America", featuring Madison Michele * "The Past Is Now", marking the addition of The History Channel to TV Guide's listings	*Michele: photograph *History: photo montage	
1997-08-30	NFL Preview (33 regional covers)	Photograph	
1997-09-06	"Returning Favorites" preview, featuring Gillian Anderson and David Duchovny of The X-Files, Candice Bergen of Murphy Brown, Eriq LaSalle and Noah Wyle of ER, Julia Louis-Dreyfus of Seinfeld, and Michael J. Fox of Spin City	Photograph	
1997-09-13	Fall Preview	Text graphic	Tom Nikosey for TV Guide
1997-09-20	Remembering Princess Diana	Photograph	
1997-09-27	* Drew Carey of The Drew Carey Show; *Baseball Playoff Preview(4 regional covers)	Photograph	Carey: Gregory Heisler
1997-10-04	Gregory Hines of The Gregory Hines Show	Photograph	
1997-10-11	Ellen DeGeneres of Ellen	Photograph	
1997-10-18	Melissa Joan Hart of Sabrina, the Teenage Witch	Photograph	
1997-10-25	* "Parents' Guide to Kids TV", featuring Larisa Oleynik of The Secret World of Alex Mack and Irene Ng of The Mystery Files of Shelby Woo; *Members of the Cleveland Indians and Florida Marlins (6 regional covers)	Photograph	
1997-11-01	* Brandy Norwood and Whitney Houston of Cinderella; Inset: Calista Flockhart of Ally McBeal; *Coach Larry Bird of the Indiana Pacers (regional cover, marking the addition of Fox Sports Midwest to the Indiana listings)	Photograph	
1997-11-08	* Terry Farrell of Star Trek: Deep Space Nine * Jeri Ryan of Star Trek: Voyager	Photograph	
1997-11-15	Gillian Anderson and David Duchovny of The X-Files with series creator Chris Carter	Photograph	
1997-11-22	Jenna Elfman of Dharma & Greg	Photograph	Troy House for TV Guide
1997-11-29	Brooke Shields of Suddenly Susan	Photograph	Diego Uchitel for TV Guide
1997-12-06	Roma Downey of Touched by an Angel	Photograph	
1997-12-13	"The Year in Jeers", featuring Peri Gilpin of Frasier (chewing on the "R" in Year") and, in insets, Mike Tyson, Lucy Lawless, & Marv Albert	Photograph	Gilpin: Fergus Greer for TV Guide
1997-12-20	"The Best of '97", featuring "Performers of the Year" Katie Couric & Matt Lauer of Today	Photograph	Uli Rose for TV Guide
1997-12-27	"College Bowl Preview" (14 regional covers)	Photograph	

== 1998 ==
Issue date	Cover subject	Type of cover	Artist
1998-01-03	Characters from The Simpsons appearing on 4 covers	Illustration	Matt Groening
1998-01-10	"Winter Preview", featuring Tom Selleck of The Closer, Vivica A. Fox of Getting Personal, Peta Wilson of La Femme Nikita, and the cast of Dawson's Creek	Photo montage	Fox: Challenge Roddie for TV Guide; Wilson: Michael Daks; Creek: Frank Ockenfels for The WB
1998-01-17	Steve Harris, Dylan McDermott, & Lara Flynn Boyle of The Practice	Photograph	
1998-01-24	*Remembering Sonny Bono * Super Bowl XXXII participants Brett Favre, John Elway, Dorsey Levens, Antonio Freeman, and Mark Chmura (separate covers)	Photograph	
1998-01-31	Yasmine Bleeth of The Lake	Photograph	
1998-02-07	1998 Winter Olympics preview(5 covers) * Joel Otto and John LeClair (ice hockey) * Michelle Kwan (figure skating) * Tara Lipinski (figure skating) * Tommy Moe (skiing) * Keith Tkachuk (ice hockey)	Photograph	Lipinski: Donna Terek; Moe: Michael Daks; Tkachuk: Jeffrey Lowe
1998-02-14	* Thomas Gibson and Jenna Elfman of Dharma & Greg * "Legends of NASCAR", on the circuit's 50th anniversary(4 covers) ** Mark Martin and Bobby Allison ** Dale Jarrett and Cale Yarborough ** Richard Petty and Dale Earnhardt ** David Pearson and Jeff Gordon	Photograph	Jarrett/Yarborough: Darrien Davis for TV Guide
1998-02-21	Kelsey Grammer and David Hyde Pierce of Frasier	Photograph	
1998-02-28	Calista Flockhart, Gil Bellows, and Courtney Thorne-Smith of Ally McBeal	Photograph	
1998-03-07	* James Van Der Beek, Katie Holmes, Joshua Jackson and Michelle Williams of Dawson's Creek appearing separately on 4 covers * Patrick Stewart of Moby Dick; *Remembering Harry Caray	Photograph	
1998-03-14	"Parents' Guide to Kids' TV", featuring Arthur & D. W. of Arthur	Illustration	
1998-03-21	"Oscar Preview", featuring nominees Matt Damon, Helen Hunt, Burt Reynolds, and Leonardo DiCaprio & Kate Winslet	Photo montage	
1998-03-28	*Cartaman, Stan, Kyle, and Kenny of South Park * Benjamin Bratt, Carey Lowell, Sam Waterston, and Jerry Orbach of Law & Order4	* Park: illustration * Law: photograph	Law: Michael Daks for TV Guide
1998-04-04	TV Guide's 45th Anniversary Celebration	Cover montage	
1998-04-11	Madonna	Photograph	
1998-04-18	"Before They Were Movie Stars", featuring then-and-now photos of Leonardo DiCaprio, Brad Pitt, and Jodie Foster	Photo montage	
1998-04-25	Peta Wilson of La Femme Nikita	Photograph	Marc Royce for TV Guide
1998-05-02	Matthew Perry of Friends	Photograph	
1998-05-09	"A Fond Farwell to Seinfeld, featuring Michael Richards, Jerry Seinfeld, Julia Louis-Dreyfus, & Jason Alexander on 4 separate covers	Illustration	Al Hirschfeld for TV Guide
1998-05-16	Julia Roberts	Photograph	
1998-05-23	"Summer Movie Preview", featuring Tom Hanks, Jim Carrey, Drew Barrymore, and an image from Godzilla	Photo montage	Hanks: David James for DreamWorks; Carrey: Melinda Sue Gordon/Paramount Pictures; Barrymore: Stephen F. Morley/20th Century Fox; Godzilla: Centropolis Effects/Columbia/TriStar
1998-05-30	Remembering Frank Sinatra	Photograph	
1998-06-06	"Summer Preview", featuring Magic Johnson of The Magic Hour	Photograph	Mark Hanauer for TV Guide
1998-06-13	"Summer Soaps Preview", featuring Jensen Ackles, Laura Wright, Ingo Rademacher; Inset: Remembering Phil Hartman	Photograph	
1998-06-20	Gillian Anderson & David Duchovny of The X-Files(separate covers)	Photograph	
1998-06-27	Taylor, Zac & Isaac Hanson of the band Hanson	Photograph	
1998-07-04	Matt Lauer of Today	Photograph	
1998-07-11	"TV's 50 Greatest Sports Moments", featuring Kirk Gibson, Tiger Woods, John Elway, Joe Frazier vs. Muhammad Ali, & Kerri Strug	Photo montage	Gibson and Elway: AP/Wide World; Strug: Al Teilemans for Sports Illustrated
1998-07-18	Brandy Norwood of Moesha; The death of Phil Hartman	Photograph	
1998-07-25	"TV Confidential!" featuring Jerry Mathers, Johnny Carson, Ted Nugent, Soupy Sales, and the legs of Mary Hart	Photo montage	Carson: NBC; Sales: George Joseph
1998-08-01	Drew Carey of Whose Line Is It Anyway?	Photograph	Michael Tighe for TV Guide
1998-08-08	"The 50 Greatest Movies On TV & Video"	Photo montage	
1998-08-15	TV's commemoration of the anniversary of the death of Princess Diana	Photograph	
1998-08-22	"TV's 10 Best Dressed", featuring Vivica A. Fox of Getting Personal and Thomas Gibson of Dharma & Greg	Photograph	
1998-08-29	NFL Preview(32 regional covers)	Photograph	
1998-09-05	"Returning Favorites" issue, featuring Calista Flockhart of Ally McBeal, Kelsey Grammer of Frasier, Bill Cosby of Cosby, Dylan McDermott of The Practice, Anthony Edwards of ER, and Sarah Michelle Gellar of Buffy the Vampire Slayer	Photo montage	Grammer: Paramount Pictures; Cosby: Tony Esparza/CBS; McDermott: James Minchin
1998-09-12	Fall Preview	Word art	Michael Doret for TV Guide
1998-09-19	Tim Allen of Home Improvement		Darien Davis for TV Guide
1998-09-26	Lisa Nicole Carson, Calista Flockhart and Jane Krakowski of Ally McBeal		
1998-10-03	The cast of Frasier		Kate Garner for TV Guide
1998-10-10	Oprah Winfrey		Timothy White for TV Guide
1998-10-17	Halloween Preview featuring characters from The Simpsons	Illustration	
1998-10-24	Walter Cronkite & John Glenn		Daniela Stallinger for TV Guide
1998-10-31	Steve Burns and Blue from Blue's Clues	Photograph	John-Francis Bourke for TV Guide
1998-11-07	David Boreanaz of Buffy the Vampire Slayer and Keri Russell of Felicity	Photograph	Challenge Roddie for TV Guide
1998-11-14	Robin Williams		
1998-11-21	Christopher Reeve and Jerry Seinfeld		
1998-11-28	Kristen Johnston of 3rd Rock from the Sun		
1998-12-05	WWF Superstars Stone Cold Steve Austin, The Undertaker and WCW Wrestlers Goldberg and Hollywood Hulk Hogan (separate covers)		
1998-12-12	Shannen Doherty, Holly Marie Combs and Alyssa Milano of Charmed		
1998-12-19	Darrell Hammond & Molly Shannon of Saturday Night Live		Uli Rose for TV Guide
1998-12-26	Robert Young from ABC Photo Archive, Flip Wilson by Gene Trindl, Tammy Wynette by Randee St. Nicholas, Esther Rolle by Don Peterson, Roy Rogers from TV Guide archive, Shari Lewis, & Phil Hartman		

== 1999 ==
Issue date	Cover subject	Type of cover	Artist
1999-01-02	*Diane Sawyer and Barbara Walters of ABC News; *Members of the Florida State and Tennessee football teams (6 covers)	Photograph	
1999-01-09	"Winter Preview", featuring Eddie Murphy of The PJ's, Jennifer Grey of It's Like, You Know..., John Larroquette of Payne, and the title character of Dilbert	Photo montage	Murphy: Archive Photos/Express News; Larroquette: Tony Esparza for CBS; Dilbert: United Features Syndicate
1999-01-16	*Rick Schroder of NYPD Blue; Inset: Katie Holmes of Dawson's Creek; *Mike Tyson	Photograph	
1999-01-23	"The 50 Funniest TV Moments of All Time", featuring Carol Burnett, Lucille Ball, and Jerry Seinfeld	Photo montage	
1999-01-30	"The TV Guide Awards" preview, featuring Jenna Elfman, Bill Cosby, Calista Flockhart, Michael J. Fox, Christina Applegate, Jimmy Smits, Roma Downey, and Tim Allen	Photo montage	Elfman: Bob D'Amico for ABC; Cosby: Tony Esparza for CBS; Flockhart: Davis Factor for Fox; Fox: Timothy White for ABC; Applegate: Sam Jones for NBC; Smits: Gwendolen Cates for ABC; Downey: Cliff Lipsom for CBS; Allen: Kimberly Butler for ABC
1999-02-06	George Clooney of ER	Photograph	CPI
1999-02-13	*Colm Feore of Storm of the Century; *NASCAR preview, featuring drivers Jeff Gordon, Dale Jarrett, Mark Martin, and Rusty Wallace (separate covers)	*Feore: illustration *NASCAR: photograph	*Feore: Matt Mahurin for TV Guide; *NASCAR: Marc Royce for TV Guide
1999-02-20	Patricia Heaton, Ray Romano, & Brad Garrett of Everybody Loves Raymond, recreating the 1968-09-07 Family Affair cover	Photograph	Darien Davis
1999-02-27	Tina Majorino & Martin Short of Alice in Wonderland	Photo montage	
1999-03-06	The cast of 7th Heaven	Photograph	
1999-03-13	*Jenna Elfman & Matthew McConaughey of the film EDtv; *Chamique Holdsclaw of the Tennessee Volunteers	Photograph	
1999-03-20	"Oscar preview", featuring nominees Gwyneth Paltrow, Tom Hanks, Nick Nolte, and Meryl Streep	Photo montage/word art	
1999-03-27	Wrestlers Stone Cold Steve Austin, The Rock, Sable, and Mankind appearing on 4 separate covers	Photograph	Uli Rose for TV Guide
1999-04-03	Bender of Futurama	Illustration	
1999-04-10	Lucy Lawless of Xena: Warrior Princess & Jeri Ryan of Star Trek: Voyager	Photograph	Kate Garner for TV Guide
1999-04-17	David Duchovny of The X-Files	Photograph	Cliff Watts for TV Guide
1999-04-24	*"Sweeps Preview", featuring Brandy and Diana Ross of Double Platinum, Heather Locklear of Melrose Place, and Garth Brooks (national); *Philadelphia Flyers players John LeClair, Rod Brind'Amour, Eric Lindros, and Mark Recchi (separate covers)	*Sweeps: photo montage *Flyers: photograph	
1999-05-01	*Calista Flockhart of Ally McBeal; *1999 Kentucky Derby preview, featuring General Challenge and jockey Gary Stevens	Photograph	
1999-05-08	*Camryn Manheim of The Practice; *A salute to John Elway (4 covers)	Photograph	
1999-05-15	The film Star Wars: Episode I – The Phantom Menace (4 covers forming a montage); *Jake Lloyd as Anakin Skywalker with C-3PO and R2-D2; *Liam Neeson as Qui-Gon Jinn with Darth Maul; *Darth Maul with Ewan McGregor as Obi-Wan Kenobi; *Natalie Portman as Queen Padme Amidala	Illustration	
1999-05-22	Patricia Richardson & Tim Allen of Home Improvement, with a 1992 cast photo in inset	Photograph	
1999-05-29	*The finale of Star Trek: Deep Space Nine (4 newsstand covers) ** Avery Brooks ** Nana Visitor and René Auberjonois ** Michael Dorn, Armin Shimerman, and Nicole deBoer ** Alexander Siddig, Colm Meaney, and Cirroc Lofton; *The cast of Just Shoot Me (subscriber cover)	Photograph	
1999-06-05	*Ricky Martin (2 covers); *Members of the Buffalo Sabres and Colorado Avalanche (8 covers)	Photograph	
1999-06-12	Characters Jabba the Hutt, Jar Jar Binks, Watto, and Boss Nass from the film Star Wars: Episode I – The Phantom Menace (separate covers)		
1999-06-19	*Laura Prepon, Topher Grace, and Danny Masterson of That '70s Show; *Wrestler Sable	Photograph	
1999-06-26	Pamela Anderson Lee of V.I.P.		
1999-07-03	"The 50 Greatest Commercials of All Time", featuring Life cereal's Mikey, Taco Bell chihuahua Gidget, Michael Jordan, and the Energizer Bunny	Photo montage	
1999-07-10	Chris Rock	Photograph	Frank W. Ockenfels
1999-07-17	*Dennis Franz of NYPD Blue; *NASCAR stars Bobby Labonte, Tony Stewart, Jeremy Mayfield, and Jeff Burton (separate covers)	Photograph	
1999-07-24	"TV Confidential 2", featuring Madonna, Scott Baio, Susan Olsen, & Bob Eubanks	Photo montage	Olsen: ABC Photo Archive
1999-07-31	Remembering John F. Kennedy Jr.	Photograph	
1999-08-07	"TV's 16 Sexiest Stars", featuring David James Elliott of JAG and Alyssa Milano of Charmed (separate covers)	Photograph	Alberto Tolot for TV Guide
1999-08-14	*Wrestlers Kimberly Page, Kevin Nash, Randy Savage, and Sting (separate newsstand covers) *"TV's Macho Men", featuring Sammo Hung of Martial Law, Kevin Sorbo of Hercules: The Legendary Journeys, and Chuck Norris of Walker, Texas Ranger (subscriber cover)	Photograph	*Page, Nash, and Savage: Frank W Ockenfels III for TV Guide; Sting: Darryl Estrine for TV Guide
1999-08-21	Cher	Photograph	
1999-08-28	NFL preview issue (34 regional covers)	Photograph	
1999-09-04	"Returning Favorites" issue, featuring David Duchovny of The X-Files, Jennifer Aniston of Friends, Ray Romano of Everybody Loves Raymond, Roma Downey of Touched by an Angel, D. L. Hughley of The Hughleys, and Katie Holmes of Dawson's Creek	Photo montage	Downey: Cliff Lipson for CBS; Hughley: George Lange for ABC
1999-09-11	Fall Preview	Word art	
1999-09-18	*Faith Hill; *Sammy Sosa of the Chicago Cubs	Photograph	
1999-09-25	*"The Best New Shows", featuring Shiri Appleby of Roswell, Jay Mohr of Action, Linda Cardellini of Freaks and Geeks, David Boreanaz of Angel, Sela Ward of Once and Again, and Rob Lowe of The West Wing (national); *Cleveland Browns players Lomas Brown, Orlando Brown, Antonio Langham, and Jamir Miller (separate regional covers); *New York Mets players Mike Piazza, Edgardo Alfonzo, Al Leiter, and Robin Ventura (separate regional covers)	* "Best": photo montage *Browns and Mets: photograph	Ward: Challenge Roddie for TV Guide; Lowe: Kevin Foley for NBC
1999-10-02	*Melissa Joan Hart of Sabrina, the Teenage Witch; *Baseball playoff preview, featuring members of the Cleveland Indians, Arizona Diamondbacks, New York Yankees, Boston Red Sox, and Cincinnati Reds (20 separate covers)	Photograph	
1999-10-09	Katie Couric of Today	Photograph	
1999-10-16	"TV's 50 Greatest Characters Ever!" featuring Cosmo Kramer, Mr. Spock, J. R. Ewing, and Mary Richards	Photo montage	
1999-10-23	*"Grownups are back!" featuring Billy Campbell and Sela Ward of Once and Again; *Amanda Bynes of The Amanda Show(Ultimate Cable edition)	Photograph	
1999-10-30	Characters from Pokémon (4 covers forming a montage)	Illustration	
1999-11-06	*Regis Philbin of Who Wants to Be a Millionaire; *NBA preview, featuring Tim Duncan of the San Antonio Spurs and Kevin Garnett of the Minnesota Timberwolves (separate covers)	Photograph	Philbin: Josef Astor for TV Guide
1999-11-13	Pierce Brosnan	Photograph	Cliff Watts for TV Guide
1999-11-20	*Celine Dion (national); *Remembering Walter Payton (Chicago area); *Members of the Portland Trail Blazers (4 regional covers)	Photograph	
1999-11-27	Rosie O'Donnell of The Rosie O'Donnell Show	Photograph	
1999-12-04	Michael Jackson	Photograph	
1999-12-11	Amy Brenneman of Judging Amy	Photograph	Kate Garner for TV Guide
1999-12-18	The cast of Ally McBeal (foldout cover)	Illustration	Al Hirschfeld
1999-12-25	Dennis Haysbert, Eric Close, & Margaret Colin of Now and Again	Photograph	Stephen Danelian for TV Guide

== Sources ==
- Covers and table of contents page descriptions for the various issues.
- TV Guide: Fifty Years of Television, New York, NY: Crown Publishers, 2002. ISBN 1-4000-4685-8
- Stephen Hofer, ed., TV Guide: The Official Collectors Guide, Braintree, Mass.: BangZoom Publishers, 2006. ISBN 0-9772927-1-1.
- "50 Greatest TV Guide Covers", article from the June 15, 2002 edition of TV Guide
- Information from ellwanger.tv's TV Guide collection section
