= Nowhere to Run, Nowhere to Hide =

Single by Gravediggaz

from the album 6 Feet Deep
- B-side: "Freak the Sorceress"
- Released: September 6, 1994
- Recorded: 1994
- Studio: GLC Sound Studios (New York City); Paul's Coffee Shop (Long Island); Firehouse Studio (New York City)
- Genre: Horrorcore
- Length: 3:55
- Label: Gee Street
- Songwriters: Anthony Ian Berkeley; Robert Diggs; Arnold Hamilton; Paul Huston
- Producer: Prince Paul

Gravediggaz singles chronology
"Diary of a Madman" (1994)	"Nowhere to Run, Nowhere to Hide" (1994)	"1-800 Suicide" (1995)

Music video
- "Nowhere to Run, Nowhere to Hide" on YouTube

"Nowhere to Run, Nowhere to Hide" is a song written and performed by American hardcore hip-hop four-piece supergroup Gravediggaz. It was released on September 6, 1994, via Gee Street Records as the second single from the group's debut full-length studio album 6 Feet Deep. Recording sessions took place at GLC Sound Studios, Paul's Coffee Shop and Firehouse Studio in New York City. Production was handled by member Prince Paul, who utilized elements from Gene McDaniels' "Jagger the Dagger". An accompanying music video was directed by David Perez Shadi. The UK version of the single features a remix done by Portishead.

In the United States, the single made it to number 32 on the Hot Rap Songs and number 27 on the Dance Singles Sales charts. It found more success in the United Kingdom, peaking at number 78 on the UK singles chart and number 20 on the Official Dance Singles Chart.

== Track listing ==
US 12" vinyl
No.	Title	Length
1.	"Nowhere to Run, Nowhere to Hide" (Album Version)	3:55
2.	"Nowhere to Run, Nowhere to Hide" (Clean Radio Edit)	3:35
3.	"Nowhere to Run, Nowhere to Hide" (Instrumental)	3:55
4.	"Freak the Sorceress"	3:57
5.	"Freak the Sorceress" (Instrumental)	3:57
6.	"The Reincarnation of Freud"	1:17
7.	"Nowhere to Run, Nowhere to Hide" (Acappella)	3:55

== Personnel ==
- Anthony "Too Poetic" Berkeley — songwriter, vocals
- Robert "RZA" Diggs — songwriter, vocals
- Arnold "Frukwan" Hamilton — songwriter, vocals
- "Prince Paul" Huston — songwriter, producer, arranger, mixing
- Jorge "Kurious" Alvarez — additional vocals (tracks: 1, 2, 7)
- Don McKenzie — additional vocals (tracks: 1, 2, 7)
- Gerald Whaley — additional vocals (tracks: 1, 2, 7)
- Ethan Ryman — recording
- Scott Harding — recording, mixing
- Djinji Brown — mixing assistant
- Emerson Mykoo — mixing assistant
- Chris Gehringer — mastering
- Christian Witkin — photography

== Charts ==
Chart (1994)	Peak position
UK Singles (OCC)	78
UK Dance (OCC)	20
US Hot Rap Songs (Billboard)	32
US Dance Singles Sales (Billboard)	27
