= Cherry Martinez =

- Born: Deborah Tennyson; October 13, 1974 (age 52); Boston, Massachusetts
- Education: Emerson College
- Occupation: Radio Personality
- Years active: 1991–present
- Children: 1
- Website: http://www.cherryontop.com/

Deborah Tennyson (born October 10, 1974), known professionally as Cherry Martinez, is a radio personality, DJ, program director, philanthropist, and chairman/publisher of Cherry On Top. Cherry Martinez was host of No. 1 evening DJ program in New York, Power 105.1 and following host for the nationally syndicated radio program “Power After Hours”. Also specializing in celebrity news, guest interviews included Jae Millz, Chrisette Michele, Adrienne Bailon, and Charlie Baltimore. Cherry is also known for founding the annual women's media/entertainment ceremonial Girl Power Awards, with (VH1 Executive Producer, CEO) Mona Scott and a developed feud with radio DJ Funkmaster Flex of rival station Hot 97. She is recognized as the voice on the Hip Hop record “Funkorama” by Redman off the Insomnia (Erick Sermon album).

== Radio career ==
Cherry Martinez attended Emerson College where she penned the handle “Cherry Martinez” while hosting the WERS-FM (88.9) College radio program.

Cherry received her first position in 1992 as an intern for Boston's Wild AM (1090) radio station. Cherry was then hired by the program director Stephen Hill, now vice president of music programming and talent at BET, to run segments on Fridays, Saturdays, and Sundays.

In June 2003, while at Sirius Satellite Radio in Philadelphia, Cherry was hired by WWPR-FM (Power 105.1) program director Michael Saunders to serve as a DJ, moving on to host the 6pm show.

== Public Disputes ==
In 2006, DJ Funkmaster Flex of Hot 97 reportedly made derogatory remarks against Cherry Martinez on air and made references against her surname citing Hot 97 co-host, Angie Martinez, “is the only Martinez that matters.” For his part, Flex says of the name calling, I didn't say it; somebody said it while I was on the air. I made sure that they never said it again. Adding I was teasing her about it because it's what radio is built on. You're in a war; it's about building your name and staying on top.

Cherry Martinez responded to the broadcast with a release of a Diss track that played as the intro for listeners of the show and published an open letter on observations of struggle for women in media, citing “The radio industry is like Highschool”.

== Award Ceremonies ==
In 2012, Cherry Martinez founded an award ceremony celebrating powerful women in media and entertainment honoring Mona Scott in production of VH1 show Love and Hip Hop, as well presenting the “Girl Power Award” to Jennifer Graziano of Mob Wives. Awards were also given to publicly voted sororities, and schools in African American, and Hispanic communities.
