= Diary of a Madman (song) =

Single by Gravediggaz featuring Killah Priest and Scientific Shabazz

from the album 6 Feet Deep
- B-side: "Constant Elevation"
- Released: June 21, 1994
- Recorded: 1994
- Genre: Horrorcore
- Length: 4:38
- Label: Gee Street
- Songwriter(s): Gravediggaz
- Producer(s): RZA, Prince Paul, RNS

Gravediggaz singles chronology
"Diary of a Madman" (1994)	"Nowhere to Run, Nowhere to Hide" (1994)

Music video
- "Diary of a Madman" on YouTube

"Diary of a Madman" is the debut single by the Gravediggaz, released in June 1994 from their debut album, 6 Feet Deep. The song was produced by members RZA (The Rzarector) and Prince Paul (The Undertaker) along with RNS and featured verses from Killah Priest and Scientific Shabazz. "Diary of a Madman" was Gravediggaz' most successful single, peaking at No. 82 on the Billboard Hot 100, their only single to reach the chart, as well as No. 8 on the Hot Rap Singles chart.

== Background and composition ==
In an interview with HipHopSite.com, Prince Paul said that the sample looped in the song was produced by RNS. The story of the song is set in a courtroom, where a man possessed by evil spirits confesses to a murder and his story behind it, over a loop of haunting vocals.

== Track listing ==
=== A-side ===
1. "Diary of a Madman" (album version) – 4:38
2. "Diary of a Madman" (album clean version) – 4:37
3. "Diary of a Madman" (no courtroom) – 4:05

=== B-side ===
1. "Constant Elevation" (album version) – 2:34
2. "Constant Elevation" (radio clean version) – 2:31
3. "Constant Elevation" (instrumental) – 2:31
4. "Diary of a Madman" (instrumental) – 4:38

== Charts ==
Chart	Position
U.S. Billboard Hot 100	82
U.S. R&B / Hip-Hop	57
Hot Rap Singles	8
Hot Dance Music/Maxi-Singles Sales	11
