= The Hell E.P. =

EP by Gravediggaz and Tricky
- Released: 1995
- Recorded: 1995
- Genre: Trip hop
- Label: 4th & B'way; Island; PolyGram; (854 383)
- Producer: Tricky; The RZArector

Gravediggaz chronology
6 Feet Deep (1994)	The Hell EP (1995)	The Pick, the Sickle and the Shovel (1997)

Tricky chronology
Maxinquaye (1995)	The Hell EP (1995)	Nearly God (1996)

Professional ratings
Review scores
Source	Rating
AllMusic	2/5 stars

The Hell E.P. is a collaboration EP by English trip hop artist Tricky and American hip hop group Gravediggaz that was released in July 1995 on 4th & B'way Records.

The first two tracks, "Hell Is Round the Corner" and its remix, were performed solely by Tricky, the final two tracks, however, were performed by both Tricky and the Gravediggaz. Gravedigga member The Rzarector co-produced the two songs with Tricky. "Psychosis" only featured vocals from The Grym Reaper, while all three rapping members appeared on "Tonight is a Special Night". The group's producer The Undertaker did not participate in the recordings. It was mixed in London by Ian Caple.

Due to its length, the E.P. was ineligible to make the UK Albums Chart, instead it reached the top 20 on the UK Singles charts entering in at number 12 and spending 3 weeks in the charts.

"Tonite is a Special Nite" would later appear on the soundtrack of The Crow: City of Angels in 1996.

== Track listing ==
1. "Hell Is Round the Corner" – 3:45
2. "Hell Is Round the Corner" (The Hell & Water Mix) – 4:20
3. "Psychosis" – 6:35
4. "Tonight Is a Special Night" – 4:45

== Charts ==
Chart (1995)	Peak position
UK Singles Chart	12
