= 6 Feet Under (album) =

Compilation album by Gravediggaz
- Released: March 30, 2004
- Recorded: 2002–2004
- Genre: Horrorcore
- Length: 62:11
- Label: X-Ray/Cleopatra Records

Gravediggaz chronology
Nightmare in A-Minor (2002)	6 Feet Under (2004)

Professional ratings
Review scores
Source	Rating
Allmusic	2/5 stars

6 Feet Under is a compilation album by Gravediggaz, consisting of material that originally appeared on Nightmare in A-Minor and Frukwan's solo album Life. This album was released by X-ray/Cleopatra Records.

== Track listing ==
#	Title	Time	Producer(s)	Performers
1	"Six Feet Underground"	4:13	Frukwan	First verse/Third verse: The Grym Reaper; Second verse/Fourth verse: The Gatekeeper
2	"Big Shot Dead"	4:05		Intro/Chorus/First verse/Second verse/Third verse: The Gatekeeper
3	"Know What I Mean"	4:18		Chorus/First verse/Second verse/Third verse: The Gatekeeper
4	"What's Wrong With You?"	4:04		First verse/Chorus/Second verse: The Gatekeeper; Third verse: Lady Tigra
5	"A Strong Woman"	5:03		Intro/First verse/Chorus/Second verse/Third verse: The Gatekeeper
6	"Rough Enough"	4:03		Chorus/First verse/Second verse/Third verse: The Gatekeeper
7	"What's the Meaning?"	4:02		Chorus/First verse\Second verse\Third verse: The Gatekeeper
8	"Gotta Stay Strong"	3:47		Chorus/First verse\Second verse/Third verse: The Gatekeeper
9	"Home of the Brave"	4:58		Chorus\First verse\Second verse\Third verse: The Gatekeeper
10	"Players' Theme"	4:28	Frukwan	Intro/Chorus/First verse/Third verse: The Gatekeeper
11	"Burn in Hell"	4:23		Intro: The Gatekeeper; First verse\Third verse: The Gatekeeper; Second verse\Fourth verse: The Grym Reaper
12	"Break What?"	4:02	Frukwan	Intro/Chorus/First verse: The Gatekeeper; Second verse: The Grym Reaper
13	"Alone in the Graveyard"	3:56		Intro/Chorus/First verse: The Gatekeeper; Second verse: The Grym Reaper
14	"Barking up the Wrong Tree"	4:16	Frukwan	Intro/Chorus: The Gatekeeper; First verse/Third verse: The Gatekeeper; Second verse\Fourth verse: The Grym Reaper
15	"I Understand That"	2:15	Frukwan	Intro/First verse/Second verse: The Gatekeeper
