= Funkorama =

Single by Redman

from the album Insomnia - The Erick Sermon Compilation Album
- Released: December 19, 1995
- Recorded: 1995
- Genre: Hip hop
- Length: 3:02
- Label: Interscope
- Songwriters: Reginald Noble; Jonathan Davis; Ali Shaheed Muhammad; Malik Taylor; Mark Morales; Darren Robinson; Damon Wimbley
- Producer: Redman

Redman singles chronology
"How High" (1995)	"Funkorama" (1995)	"It's Like That (My Big Brother)" (1996)

Music video
- "Funkorama" on YouTube

"Funkorama" is a song by American rapper Redman. It was released on December 19, 1995 via Interscope Records as the first single from The Erick Sermon Compilation Album Insomnia. Written and produced by Redman, it samples "Midnight" by A Tribe Called Quest and "Stick 'Em" by The Fat Boys. The single peaked at number 81 on the Billboard Hot 100 in the United States. Black-and-white music video starring Redman also featured cameos from Def Squad, Method Man, Treach, Q-Tip and other fellow rappers.

== Track listing ==
A Side
No.	Title	Writer(s)	Producer(s)	Length
1.	"Funkorama" (LP Version)	Reggie Noble	Redman	3:02
2.	"Funkorama" (Funk Doctor Mix)	Noble	Redman	3:02
3.	"Funkorama" (Instrumental LP Mix)	Noble	Redman	3:02

B Side
No.	Title	Writer(s)	Producer(s)	Length
4.	"Funkorama" (LP Version Clean)	Noble	Redman	3:02
5.	"Funkorama" (Acapella)	Noble	Redman	3:02
6.	"Up Jump The Boogie" (LP Version)	E. Woodson; Erick Sermon; Tyrone Fyffe	Erick Sermon; Sugarless (co.)	4:08

== Charts ==
Chart (1996)	Peak position
US Billboard Hot 100	81
US Hot R&B/Hip-Hop Songs (Billboard)	51
US Hot Rap Songs (Billboard)	12
