= Nightmare in A-Minor =

Studio album by Gravediggaz
- Released: April 9, 2002
- Recorded: 1999–2001
- Genre: Horrorcore
- Length: 61:30
- Label: Empire Musicwerks/BMG
- Producer: Frukwan, Too Poetic, True Master, LG, Diamond J

Gravediggaz chronology
The Pick, the Sickle and the Shovel (1997)	Nightmare in A-Minor (2002)

Alternative cover

Alternative cover

Professional ratings
Review scores
Source	Rating
AllMusic	2.5/5 stars
RapReviews	7.5/10
Robert Christgau	(2-star Honorable Mention)

Nightmare in A-Minor is the third and final studio album by the hip hop supergroup Gravediggaz, recorded by two remaining members (Poetic and Frukwan) and released after Poetic's death.

By this time, RZA and Prince Paul had left the group, and Poetic died after his 2-year fight with Colon cancer. The album was produced by Too Poetic, Frukwan, LG, Diamond J, and True Master (For Wu-Tang Productions) and features guest appearances from Wu-Tang affiliates Killarmy and Sunz of Man, and an intro from fellow member Prince Paul, introducing new Gravediggaz DJ Diamond J as a member of the group. Too Poetic rhymes about his terminal illness on the track "Burn, Baby, Burn." Executive producers were J.Collins & P. Klein. The album was released with three different covers. Six tracks from the album appear on the compilation Six Feet Under under different titles and released without permission by any surviving Gravediggaz members as legal actions are in pursuit. Earlier versions of the album contain the extra songs "Current Events" and "Betta Wake up."

== Track listing ==
1. "Mike Check Intro: Prince Paul (Skit)" featuring Undertaker – 0:37
2. "Bloodshed" – 4:48
3. "False Things Must Perish" featuring Prodigal Sunn – 4:21
4. "Last Man Standing (Skit)" – 2:17
5. "Killing Fields" – 3:47
6. "Burn, Baby, Burn" (produced by True Master) – 4:23
7. "Wanna Break" – 4:02
8. "I Understand That" – 2:15
9. "Six Feet Underground" – 4:13
10. "2 Day's Mathematics" – 4:34
11. "Alone in the Graveyard" – 3:56
12. "East Coast-Vs-West Coast (Skit)" – 0:22
13. "Barking Up The Wrong Tree" – 4:16
14. "Guard Ya Shrine" – 2:15
15. "Nightmare in A-Minor" featuring Kinetic 9 and 4th Disciple of Killarmy (produced by True Master) – 4:31
16. "End of the World" – 3:22
17. "Man Only Fears" featuring Shogun Assassin of Killarmy (produced by Big French of Mad Bull Productions) – 3:56
18. "Universal Shout Outs (Skit)" – 2:47
19. "Da Crazies (Skit)" – 0:48
20. "Dont Sleep" – 4:58
21. "Current Events" – 3:56
