= 6 Feet Deep =

Studio album by Gravediggaz
- Released: August 9, 1994
- Recorded: 1991–1994
- Genre: East Coast hip-hop; horrorcore
- Length: 55:53
- Label: Gee Street; Island; PolyGram
- Producer: Prince Paul; Gatekeeper; RNS; RZA; Mr. Sime; Gravediggaz

Gravediggaz chronology
6 Feet Deep (1994)	The Hell E.P. (1995)

Singles from 6 Feet Deep
- 1. "Diary of a Madman" Released: June 21, 1994; 2. "Nowhere to Run, Nowhere to Hide" Released: September 6, 1994; 3. "1-800 Suicide" Released: January 24, 1995

6 Feet Deep (also titled Niggamortis in some regions) is the debut album of the American hip hop supergroup Gravediggaz. Formed by former Tommy Boy Records artists Prince Paul, RZA, Frukwan and Poetic, the group utilized horror-themed imagery and lyrics combined with black comedy and satire to vent their frustrations with the hip hop record industry. The album's concept satirizes the hardcore hip hop and gangsta rap of the early 1990s. Released on August 9, 1994, by Gee Street Records, the album helped usher in horrorcore.

== Production ==
The conception of the Gravediggaz group came at a low point in the careers of each of the group's members, each of which had at one point or another been signed to Tommy Boy Records and had not had good experiences with the label. Prince Paul had also contributed drums to the RZA's early single "Ooh We Love You Rakeem". According to Paul, the RZA was trying to get signed to Dew Doo Man Records, Paul's vanity label distributed by Def Jam Records, but Paul had failed to launch the label, and Def Jam put Resident Alien's It Takes a Nation of Suckers to Hold Us In, the label's lone album, on hold. Additionally, Paul and rapper Frukwan had both recently left Stetsasonic, and while Paul had received much praise for his instrumentals for De La Soul's acclaimed debut album, 3 Feet High and Rising, the group's follow-up album De La Soul is Dead was not well received, and De La Soul were beginning to handle more of their own production, alienating Paul from the group and leaving him in a "dark [and] depressed" mood, which was reflected in the instrumentals he was creating at this time. Paul called rappers RZA, Frukwan, and Poetic separately, inviting them to listen to these new instrumentals in his home, and RZA suggested that they form a group together and proposed they name it Gravediggaz, which met with the approval of the four, who each took on "grave-themed" aliases - the Undertaker (Prince Paul), the Grym Reaper (Poetic), the Gatekeeper (Frukwan) and the RZArector - and recorded the demo "The House That Hatred Built". The formation of the Gravediggaz made the group one of hip hop's first supergroups.

The demo was shopped to Def Jam and Jive Records, who both passed on the group. Subsequently, Poetic began working at a bagel factory, Frukwan got a job making clothes, and the RZA co-founded the Wu-Tang Clan, which Paul later observed had been influenced by the Gravediggaz' conceptualization as a concept-oriented rap supergroup. Eazy-E offered the Gravediggaz a contract with Ruthless Records, but Paul turned it down due to Jerry Heller's contract, which Paul described as "one of the worst [contracts] I’ve ever seen in my life." Several years after the demo was recorded, Gee Street Records offered a better contract, and subsequently signed the group. "Constant Elevation" was the first song recorded by the group after signing with Gee Street. Poetic rewrote his intro verse after some bad takes, establishing the energy that would carry over to the rest of the album's vocal sessions. RZA intended to record "Nowhere to Run, Nowhere to Hide" as a solo track, but Prince Paul recorded additional verses from Frukwan and Poetic.

== Composition ==
Gravediggaz was one of the first rap groups in the subgenre horrorcore, which The Quietus writer David Bennun described as "a then novel means of addressing black life at street level [and] finding a new way of getting that message across". Q magazine said that the Gravediggaz "use death, burial and The Grim Reaper as central themes for a chilling mid-tempo stomp through America's urban problems." Bennun connects Gravediggaz' lyrics not only to the hardcore rap lyrics of the Geto Boys and Cypress Hill, but also to EC Comics' Tales From The Crypt. According to John-Michael Bond in his review for Rap Reviews, the album's unifying theme is hate, which Gravediggaz use as "a metaphor for murdering the mindless drivel that infected early '90s rap". Hip hop at this time had shifted towards violent gangsta rap, due to the popularity of N.W.A and Ruthless Records, and the lyrical content of early-90s rap acts was seen as "vying to outdo the last for cold-blooded gruesomeness, justified on the grounds that it was simply portraying life as it is on the street", according to Bennun. In contrast to the serious-toned violent threats of hardcore rap, the Gravediggaz' lyrics combine horror themes with black comedy and satire, exemplified by the album's original title, Niggamortis. According to Bond, "Gravediggaz were born out of a disdain and hatred for the bullshit that surrounded four men whose talents were under represented at the time and set out to make the most uncompromising music possible." Bond compares 6 Feet Deep to social horror films like The Last House on the Left and Dawn of the Dead. Gravediggaz also drew inspiration from the lyrical themes and imagery of heavy metal music. "Diary of a Madman" uses imagery from the crucifixion of Jesus in RZA's verse. Despite the group intending the lyrics of "1-800 Suicide", which appear to encourage suicide, as dark humor, high scrutiny of rap lyrics at this time meant that the Gravediggaz had to record an alternate lyric version as an anti-suicide PSA.

Most of the album's instrumentals were created by Prince Paul. According to Rolling Stone, Paul's production "[evokes] the atmosphere of horror movies and ominous effects". The piano loop of "Constant Elevation" was sampled from Allen Toussaint's "Louie". "Nowhere to Run, Nowhere to Hide" samples Eugene McDaniels "Jagger’s Dagger". "Defective Trip (Trippin')" utilizes psychedelic rock electric guitar playing. It samples John Ussery's "Listen to the Melody" and Alvin Cash's "Twine Time". "2 Cups of Blood" samples it's keyboard loop from Larry Willis' "Inner Crisis." "Blood Brothers" does not utilize any samples. Paul's instrumental for "Bang Your Head" was originally created for the Cold Crush Four, but after the group rejected the instrumental, RZA proposed using it for the Gravediggaz. "Diary of a Madman", one of the album's only tracks to feature an instrumental by the RZA, utilized a shelved instrumental demo intended for a Wu-Tang Clan song, sampling Johnny Mathis. "1-800 Suicide" samples Booker T. & the M.G.'s "Sunny". "Death Trap" samples the Whole Darn Family's "7 Minutes of Funk"; The song's lyrics refer to drug overdoses, murder and Lorena Bobbitt.

== Release and reception ==
Professional ratings
Review scores
Source	Rating
AllMusic	4.5/5 stars
Chicago Tribune	2/4 stars
Christgau's Consumer Guide	(2-star Honorable Mention)
Entertainment Weekly	B
NME	4/5
RapReviews	9.5/10
Rolling Stone	3.5/5 stars
The Source	3.5/5 stars
Spin Alternative Record Guide	5/10

The album was released on August 9, 1994. It was released under the title Niggamortis outside of the United States. Entertainment Weekly wrote that "the flustered beats, washed in minor chords, are strangely irresistible". NME praised the album for "feverishly [documenting] the low life". The magazine later ranked the album at No. 22 on its list of the "Top 50 Albums of 1994". The Chicago Tribune concluded that, "Even with their rotten language and funereal imagery, the Gravediggaz's grim rapping is not the lurid, flesh-chopping of, say, Insane Poetry."

In 2009, Fangoria named it as an iconic horrorcore album. In 2022, Rolling Stone placed it at number 177 on their list of the 200 Greatest Hip-Hop Albums of All Time. The magazine's writer Mosi Reeves said, "As a major label-backed attempt to bring horrorcore to the mainstream, Gravediggaz were a notable failure. But plenty of heads found pleasure in this bugged-out satire of hardcore values, fire-and-brimstone theology, and horror movie tropes."

== Track listing ==
All tracks written by Anthony Berkeley, Robert Diggs, Arnold Hamilton and Paul Huston and produced by Prince Paul except where noted.

Side A
No.	Title	Producer(s)	Length
1.	"Just When You Thought It Was Over (Intro)"		0:10
2.	"Constant Elevation"		2:30
3.	"Nowhere to Run, Nowhere to Hide"		3:55
4.	"Defective Trip (Trippin')"		5:04
5.	"2 Cups of Blood"		1:24
6.	"Blood Brothers"	Gatekeeper	4:47
7.	"360 Questions"		0:33
8.	"1-800 Suicide"		4:14

European bonus track
No.	Title	Length
9.	"Pass the Shovel"	3:39

Side B
No.	Title	Writer(s)	Producer(s)	Length
1.	"Diary of a Madman" (featuring Shabazz the Disciple and Killah Priest)	Anthony Berkeley; Robert Diggs; Arnold Hamilton; Paul Huston; David Collins; Walter Reed	RNS; RZA; Prince Paul	4:34
2.	"Mommy, What's a Gravedigga?"	Berkeley; Diggs; Hamilton; Huston; Patrice Rushen; Angela Rushen		1:44
3.	"Bang Your Head"			3:24
4.	"Here Comes the Gravediggaz"	Berkeley; Diggs; Hamilton; Huston; Pedro Sime	Mr. Sime	3:44
5.	"Graveyard Chamber" (featuring Dreddy Kruger, Scientific Shabazz and Killah Priest)	Berkeley; Diggs; Hamilton; Huston; Collins; Reed; James Dockery	RZA	4:57
6.	"Deathtrap"	Berkeley; Diggs; Hamilton; Huston; August Moon; Tyrone Thomas		2:57
7.	"6 Feet Deep"		RZA; Gravediggaz	4:36
8.	"Rest In Peace (Outro)"			2:01
Total length:				55:53

== Charts ==
=== Weekly charts ===
Chart (1994)	Peak position
US Billboard 200	36
US Top R&B/Hip-Hop Albums (Billboard)	6

=== Year-end charts ===
Chart (1994)	Position
US Top R&B/Hip-Hop Albums (Billboard)	100

=== Singles ===
Year	Album	Peak position			
Year	Album	Billboard Hot 100	Hot R&B/Hip-Hop Singles & Tracks	Hot Rap Singles	Hot Dance Music/Maxi-Singles Sales
1994	"Diary of a Mad Man"	#82	#57	#8	#11
1994	"Nowhere to Run, Nowhere to Hide"	-	-	#32	#27
1995	"1-800 Suicide"	-	-	#46	#29

== Personnel ==
Credits adapted from AllMusic.

Gravediggaz

- The Undertaker - vocals, composer, arranger, associate producer, engineer, mixing, producer, score, scratching
- RZArector - vocals, composer, mixing, producer
- The Grym Reaper - vocals, mixing
- Gatekeeper - vocals, mixing, producer

Additional personnel

- Eddie Berkeley - vocals
- Carlos Bess - assistant engineer
- Biz Markie - guest artist, vocals
- Booker T. & the MG's - performer
- Djinji Brown - vocals
- D. Collins - composer
- Craig G - guest artist
- Chris Gehringer - engineer, mastering
- Scott Harding - bass guitar, engineer, mixing, vocals
- Hellrazor - vocals
- Penelope Houston - composer
- James Jackson - vocals
- Just-Ice - performer
- Killah Priest - vocals
- KRS-One - performer
- Kurious - guest artist, vocals
- Leroy and the Drivers - performer, primary artist
- Derrick Lovelace - vocals
- Masta Ace - guest artist
- MC Serch - guest artist, vocals
- Eugene McDaniels - composer
- Don McKenzie - vocals
- Mr. Sime - mixing, producer, vocals, composer
- Dennis Mitchell - assistant engineer
- A. Moon - composer
- Don Newkirk - keyboards
- Waymon Reed - composer
- Vernon Reid - guest artist, vocals
- RNS - producer
- Angela Rushen - composer
- Patrice Rushen - composer
- Ethan Ryman - engineer
- Scientific Shabazz - vocals
- Skiz - vocals
- Jamey Staub - assistant engineer
- Raquelle Stroud - vocals
- T. Thomas - composer
- Allen Toussaint - performer
- John Ussery - performer
- Franz Verna - assistant engineer
- The Whole Darn Family - performer
- Wildman Steve - vocals
- Tracey Amier Witherspoon - vocals
