= The Pick, the Sickle and the Shovel =

Studio album by Gravediggaz
- Released: September 16, 1997
- Studios: Ameraycan Studios, North Hollywood, CA; Firehouse Studios, NY; Paul's Coffee Shop; Unique Recording, NY; Wu Mansion, NJ
- Genres: East Coast hip hop; horrorcore
- Length: 59:38
- Labels: Gee Street/V2/BMG Records; 63881-32501
- Producers: RZA (also exec.); Neil Robertson (exec.); 4th Disciple; True Master; Poetic; Darkim Be Allah; Frukwan; Prince Paul

Gravediggaz chronology
The Hell E.P. (1995)	The Pick, the Sickle and the Shovel (1997)	Nightmare in A-Minor (2002)

The Pick, the Sickle and the Shovel is the second studio album by hip hop supergroup Gravediggaz. Released on September 16, 1997, via Gee Street, V2 and BMG Records, the album has a more socially conscious sound and is considerably calmer than its predecessor; it features heavy production input by the RZA and his production team the Wu Elements.

In contrast to the group's debut album, Prince Paul had less involvement in the production of this album. He did produce the outro and the skit preceding "Hidden Emotions." He was still billed as an official member of the group, however, and appeared on the cover and inserts of the album.

Two singles were released from the album, "Dangerous Mindz" and "The Night the Earth Cried," though neither made it to the Billboard charts.

== Critical reception ==
Professional ratings
Review scores
Source	Rating
AllMusic	4/5 stars
Christgau's Consumer Guide	(neither)
Entertainment Weekly	B
NME	8/10
Pitchfork	6.5/10
Rolling Stone	3/5 stars
The Source	3/5 stars
Spin	7/10

Spin called the album a "fanciful dystopia," writing that "each rap suggests a creative act of desperation."

Rolling Stone (9/18/97, p. 104) – 3 stars (out of 5) – "...an exotic, multilayered soundscape that is often melancholic, but also melodic....the Gravediggaz deliver plenty to sink your pick into."

Entertainment Weekly (10/31/97, p. 108) – "...guest rappers Killah Priest, Omen, and Hell Razor spin oblique horror stories from ghetto hell over bruising beats by RZA and Prince Paul." – Rating: B

Vibe (11/97, p. 149) – "This second offering from Gravediggaz...finds the Wu-Tang boardsman moving away from production and immersing himself fully in the power of words....RZA is a master MC."

Option (11-12/97, p. 100) – "Individually, it seems the Gravediggaz are trying to outdo each other (and every other MC) by writing and rapping denser, more complex rhymes than anybody....they maintain remarkable flow."

Melody Maker (09/13/97, p. 50) – "...machetes injustice, decapitates the real criminals, and burys the lot of 'em in a festering, snake-filled pit."

Rap Pages (11/97, p. 110) – "There's a lifetime supply of meta-force wordplay for the heads, enough braggadocio for the hard-core and plenty of hooks for the pop quadrant."

== Track listing ==
Track listing information is taken from the official liner notes.

The Pick, the Sickle and the Shovel
No.	Title	Writer(s)	Producer(s)	Length
1.	"Intro"	R. Diggs; A. Hamilton; A. Berkeley	The RZA	1:16
2.	"Dangerous Mindz"	R. Diggs; S. Bougard; A. Hamilton; A. Berkeley	Fourth Disciple; The RZA (co.)	4:54
3.	"Da Bomb"	D. Harris; A. Hamilton; A. Berkeley	Truemaster	4:10
4.	"Unexplained"	A. Hamilton; A. Berkeley	Poetic	2:58
5.	"Twelve Jewelz (RZA solo)"	R. Diggs; O. Miller	Darkim	2:51
6.	"Fairytalez"	S. Kinchen; A. Hamilton; A. Berkeley	Goldfinghaz	4:46
7.	"Never Gonna Come Back"	S. Kinchen; A. Hamilton; A. Berkeley; B. White	Goldfinghaz	3:48
8.	"Pit of Snakes"	R. Diggs; D. Harris; A. Hamilton; A. Berkeley	Truemaster; The RZA (co.)	4:19
9.	"The Night the Earth Cried"	R. Diggs; S. Bougard; A. Hamilton; A. Berkeley	Fourth Disciple; The RZA (co.)	4:32
10.	"Elimination Process" (Featuring Shabazz The Disciple, Omen and the Aleem Brothers)	A. Hamilton; A. Berkeley; D. Purkiss; D. Collins	Poetic	5:37
11.	"Repentance Day" (Featuring Sunz Of Man and Killah Priest)	A. Berkeley; W. Reed; C. Smith	Poetic	5:18
12.	"Hidden Emotions"	D. Harris; A. Hamilton; P. Huston; A. Berkeley	Truemaster	6:17
13.	"What's Goin' On" (Featuring 9TH Prince)	R. Diggs; T. Hamlin; A. Hamilton; A. Berkeley	The RZA	4:32
14.	"Deadliest Biz"	A. Hamilton; A. Berkeley	Frukwan	3:03
15.	"Outro"	R. Diggs; A. Hamilton; P. Huston; A. Berkeley	Prince Paul	1:17
Total length:				59:38

Notes

- "Fairytalez" features background vocals by Kelis Rogers.
- "What's Goin' On" features background vocals by Blue Raspberry.

Samples

- "Unexplained" contains a sample of "Wild Flower" by New Birth.
- "Fairytalez" contains a sample of "Themes From Montreal Olympics" by The Salsoul Orchestra.
- "Never Gonna Come Back" contains a sample of "Love Serenade" by Barry White.
