= Peter Sorel =

American photographer (born 1938)

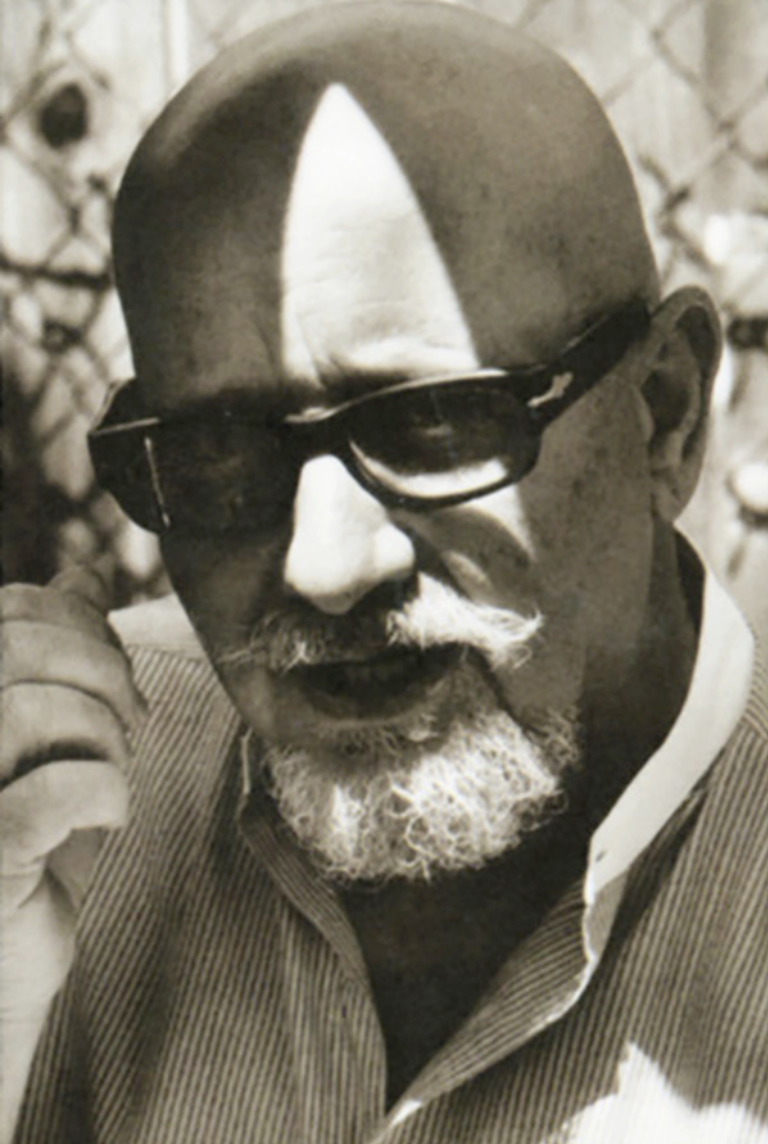
- Born: Peter Szentmiklosi; July 7, 1938 (age 88); Budapest, Kingdom of Hungary
- Occupation: Photographer
- Known for: Cinematic still photos

Peter Sorel (born Peter Szentmiklosi; July 7, 1938) is an American cinematic still photographer. In his 50 plus year career he has amassed over 150 credits. His most recognized images are the photographs he took on the set of the 1969 film, Easy Rider. He worked on many notable films including One Flew Over the Cuckoo's Nest, Dune, Die Hard, Lolita, Frida, Life of Pi and more. He has photographed A-list actors, including Madonna, Nicole Kidman, Salma Hayek, Patrick Swayze, Marlon Brando, Jack Nicholson, Clint Eastwood and others. He is a member of the International Cinematographers Guild Local 600, and a founding member of Society of Motion Picture Still Photographers.

== Early life and refugee camp ==
Peter Szentmiklosi was born on July 7, 1938, in Budapest, Kingdom of Hungary. At the age of 13, Sorel received a Voigtländer camera from his father and started taking pictures, he never formally studied photography. His early photographic interests included architecture and still lives. Less than a year after receiving the camera, Sorel was arrested by Hungarian security forces for photographing the Hungarian Parliament Building who took the exposed film out of his camera. Due to this experience, he stopped taking pictures until he left the country during the Hungarian Revolution of 1956.

Sorel spent the next 3 years in a refugee camp in Austria where he bought a Zorki camera.

== Life in Los Angeles and early career ==
In 1959, at 21 years old, Sorel emigrated to the United States and moved to Los Angeles where he worked in a photo lab and as a traveling portrait photographer. When he became a citizen in 1964 he changed his name to Sorel, inspired by a character in The Red and The Black. In Los Angeles, Sorel connected with two fellow Hungarian refugees working in film, László Kovács, and Vilmos Zsigmond, who went on to win an Oscar. Zsigmond invited Sorel to his first film set, which marked the beginning of his work on small films. During this time, Sorel formed a friendship with a young Jack Nicholson.

== Career highlights ==
=== Easy Rider (1969) ===
Sorel was hired for the role of still photographer on the film Easy Rider, directed by Dennis Hopper. The film marks the New Hollywood era of film-making emerging in the early 1970s. There were no practical sets and the movie was shot almost entirely on the road. At times, Sorel photographed from the top of a moving station wagon. Some 50 years later the still images from Easy Rider continue to appear on posters and t-shirts. In a standard agreement, Sorel does not benefit financially from the proliferation of the image(s) and the rights remain with the studio.

=== Frida (2002) ===
Sorel's images from Frida pay tribute to Frida Kahlo's original paintings and aesthetic, this is evidenced in his take on the "Two Frida's" painting that was used as the poster image for the film.

=== Life of Pi (2012) ===
In 2011, Sorel traveled to India and Taiwan to shoot his last film, Life of Pi with Ang Lee.

=== Awards ===
Received a lifetime achievement award from the SOC (Society of Operating Cameramen) in 1996.

== Retirement and later life ==
In 2008, Sorel moved to Chicago and continued to work on local films for the next 5 years. In retirement, Sore has returned to his initial interests in photography - landscapes, architecture and still lives. He has staged multiple shows of his Hollywood work at Hilton|Asmus Contemporary in Chicago and his work has been exhibited all over the world.

Sorel has a private collection of art and photography which includes, Irving Penn, Lucien Clergue, Ruth Bernhard, Willy Ronis and more. Sorel donated his archives to the Academy of Motion Pictures archives in Los Angeles where they are available for viewing by the public.

=== Return to Hungary ===
In 1996, Sorel was invited by the Hungarian government to mark the 40th Anniversary of the Hungarian Revolution. Events took place in the Hungarian Parliament Building, where he had a run in as a young photographer 40 years earlier.

== Publications ==
- 2014 Lake-Sky, An homage to Mark Rothko
- 1999 Camerimage produced a solo exhibition and accompanying limited edition book, Filmscapes "Exhibition of the Hollywood most iconic photographer presented stills taken on the set of the films: Seven, Die Hard, One Flew Over the Cuckoo's Nest and Lolita."
- 1997 GRAPHIS – Digital Photo 1
- 1992 A Day In The Life Of Hollywood, Harper/Collins
