= Cathrine Wessel =

Norwegian photographer

- Education: International Center of Photography
- Spouse: Stian Tolnæs
- Website: cathrinewessel.com

Cathrine Wessel is a Norwegian photographer based in New York City. Her work has been published in various international magazines, such as Elle, Women's Health, Glamour and Condé Nast Traveler.

Wessel began her career documenting the music industry. From there, she went on to shooting recording artists and music labels. Wessel later moved from the music scene to focusing on sports and fashion.

Wessel and her husband, Stian Tolnæs, own the luxury wool basics clothing line With & Wessel.
