= Anthony Ian Berkeley =

American rapper (1964–2001)

Poetic

Background information
- Also known as: Grym Reaper
- Born: Anthony Ian Berkeley; November 15, 1964; Trinidad and Tobago
- Origin: Long Island, New York, U.S.
- Died: July 15, 2001 (aged 36) Beverly Hills, California, U.S.
- Genres: Hip hop
- Occupations: Emcee; record producer; CEO
- Years active: 1989–2001
- Labels: Tommy Boy/Warner Bros. (1989); Gee Street/Island/PolyGram Records (1994–1996); Gee Street/V2/BMG (1997–1999); Empire Musicwerks/BMG (2000)
- Formerly of: Brothers Grym; Gravediggaz

Anthony Ian Berkeley (November 15, 1964 – July 15, 2001), better known as Poetic, was an American rapper and producer. He was also a founding member of the hip-hop group Gravediggaz, for which he used the alias Grym Reaper. He also used the alias Tony Titanium.

His daughter is the German rapper Qidinah Eunique Cudjo Berkeley, better known by her stage name Eunique.

== Early life ==
The eldest son of a minister John Berkley and Wife Ela Berkeley. With three other siblings Dawne, Edward, and Richard. Poetic was born in Trinidad and raised in the town of Wyandanch on Long Island, New York. After forming his first hip-hop group, Brothers Grym, with younger siblings Brainstorm and E Sharp in 1989, Sharp handled some of the production duties, while Poetic and Brainstorm provided vocals. The group created a buzz for itself in the underground with its first official demo, which included notable cuts such as "Circle-Circle-Dot-Dot" and "GRYMnastics." Just when the group was close to landing a record deal, Brainstorm surprisingly decided to quit hip hop altogether and forced Poetic to pursue a solo career and released a solo 12-inch single, Poetical Terror/God Made Me Funky, in 1989 on Tommy Boy/Warner Bros. Records. However, his deal with Tommy Boy fell through before the release of his first album, and Poetic fell on hard times, which included a period of homelessness.

== Gravediggaz ==
Poetic then joined Wu-Tang Clan's leader RZA, former De La Soul/Stetsasonic producer Prince Paul, and Frukwan from Stetsasonic in the hip-hop supergroup Gravediggaz. Concerning the origins of the supergroup, he said:

Prince Paul was going through a period in the business where he was, number one: not getting acknowledged for his talent, and two: not getting his monetary situation... when he owned his label, Dew-Doo Man through RAL and Def Jam, they owed him a lot of money and he really got stuck into a position as a producer where he wasn't producing for a couple of years because he was waiting on Russell Simmons, waiting to do some things. That left him frustrated, angry and kind of vexed. He's very creative, so naturally, he wanted to translate that feeling back into his music, so during that period he was making a certain type of music and he decided that he wanted to get a crew together so he could vent against the music industry. So he called on people that he was working with: myself, Frukwan and RZA as vocalists who he felt had the same opinion of the industry and how they were being treated unfairly... he put it together for that express purpose.

Each member adopted a Gravedigga alias, and Poetic became known as the Grym Reaper (with Grym, an acronym for Ghetto-Repaired Young Mind, also referring back to his first group). It was stated this stylistic change was adapted from his brief period of homelessness as his former DJ, Freddie "DJ Kaos" Cox, said in an interview "He went homeless and that took a toll on him. He hit rock bottom and that opens your eyes to go deep, and that's when he got dark. I guess it makes you strong to want it that bad. Tommy Boy jerked a lot of people." This proved to be an impressive change, as his offbeat rhyming style quickly gained attention as the group's first album, 1994's 6 Feet Deep (also known by its original title Niggamortis outside the US), garnered positive reviews and strong sales alike.

After the group's second album, The Pick, the Sickle, and the Shovel was released in 1997, The RZA and Prince Paul decided to leave Gravediggaz, leaving Frukwan and Poetic as the only remaining members. During this time, Anthony's rhyming style had matured more. He later showcased this new style in the 1998 single "Savior," which was produced by British-born producer Baby J, The song was more different than most of his Gravediggaz related material as he rhymed about how much he detested mainstream hip-hop music in general.

In April 1999, Anthony collapsed in his home studio with stomach pains and was subsequently diagnosed with colon cancer.

During this period, he collaborated with The Prodigy's Maxim Reality and Last Emperor under the name of Tony Titanium.

He created work under his original name as well as continuing work on the third Gravediggaz album. The subsequent release, Nightmare in A-Minor, was the group's darkest work yet. It made references to Poetic's cancer on the track "Burn, Baby, Burn" and on the Last Emperor's track "One Life".

In 2010, an interview was done with Poetic's former DJ Freddie "Kaos" Cox, in which the DJ discusses the early career of the rapper, and an unreleased album of Poetic's music prior to joining the gravediggaz entitled Drop Signal (which was supposed to be his debut album on Tommy Boy, before the deal with the group fell through) has surfaced on the Internet, which includes 14 tracks.

== Death ==
Poetic died of colon cancer on July 15, 2001, 1:45 pm EST, five weeks before Nightmare in A-Minor's scheduled release. He had survived almost two and a half years beyond the doctors' initial 3-month prognosis. Tributes came quickly from across the hip-hop world, both from fellow musicians such as Chuck D of Public Enemy, who wrote an article in tribute to him on his Welcome To The Terrordome commentary section on the group's website, and from critics, who widely wrote of their regret at the loss of his talent.

An intimate memorial service for him was held at the Riverside Church in Harlem on August 4, 2001, attended by his family and close friends, including bandmates Frukwan and Prince Paul.

Nightmare in A-Minor was initially released by Echo Distribution on August 23, 2001. It was re-released without the track "Better Wake Up" on Empire Musicwerks/BMG in 2002 to critical plaudits. According to Frukwan, a new album may be released using leftover material from Poetic.

== Discography ==
=== Singles ===
- "Poetical Terror / God Made Me Funky" 1989

=== Albums ===
- Droppin' Signal (1989, unreleased)

=== With Gravediggaz ===
- 6 Feet Deep (1994, Gee Street/Island/PolyGram Records)
- The Pick, the Sickle and the Shovel (1997, Gee Street/V2/BMG Records)
- Nightmare in A-Minor (2002, Empire Musicwerks/BMG Records)

=== Appearances ===
Vocals only unless otherwise noted.

- 1998: "Savior" (from Baby J's album Baby J Presents The Birth)
- 2000: "Worldwide Syndicate" (from the Maxim Reality album Hell's Kitchen)
- 2001: Better Days (album by Liquid Ltd. (of Bran Van 3000); vocals and production)
- 2001: Nightmare In A-Minor (album by Gravediggaz; vocals and production)
- 2001: "We Run Shit (with Frukwan)" (from the DJ Honda album hIII)
- 2003: "One Life" (from The Last Emperor album Music, Magic, Myth)
- 2003: "Ghetto Apostles" (from the Shabazz the Disciple album The Book of Shabazz (Hidden Scrollz))
