= Gravediggaz =

American hip-hop group

- Gravediggaz, from left to right: The RZArector, The Undertaker, The Gatekeeper and The Grym Reaper

Background information
- Origin: New York, U.S.
- Genres: East Coast hip-hop; horrorcore
- Years active: 1991–2002; 2010–2018
- Labels: Gee Street; Island; PolyGram; V2; BMG; Empire Musicwerks
- Past members: The Gatekeeper; The Grym Reaper; The RZArector; The Undertaker

Gravediggaz were an American hip-hop group from New York. Formed in 1991, known for their dark sense of humor and abrasive, menacing soundscapes, Gravediggaz blended hardcore hip-hop and gangsta rap with horror elements to pioneer the hip-hop subgenre of horrorcore.

The group was formed in 1991, bringing together Prince Paul (The Undertaker), Frukwan (The Gatekeeper), Too Poetic (The Grym Reaper) and Prince Rakeem (The RZArector). It came about largely due to the efforts of Prince Paul. Frukwan and Prince Paul were previously together in the group Stetsasonic.

== Biography ==
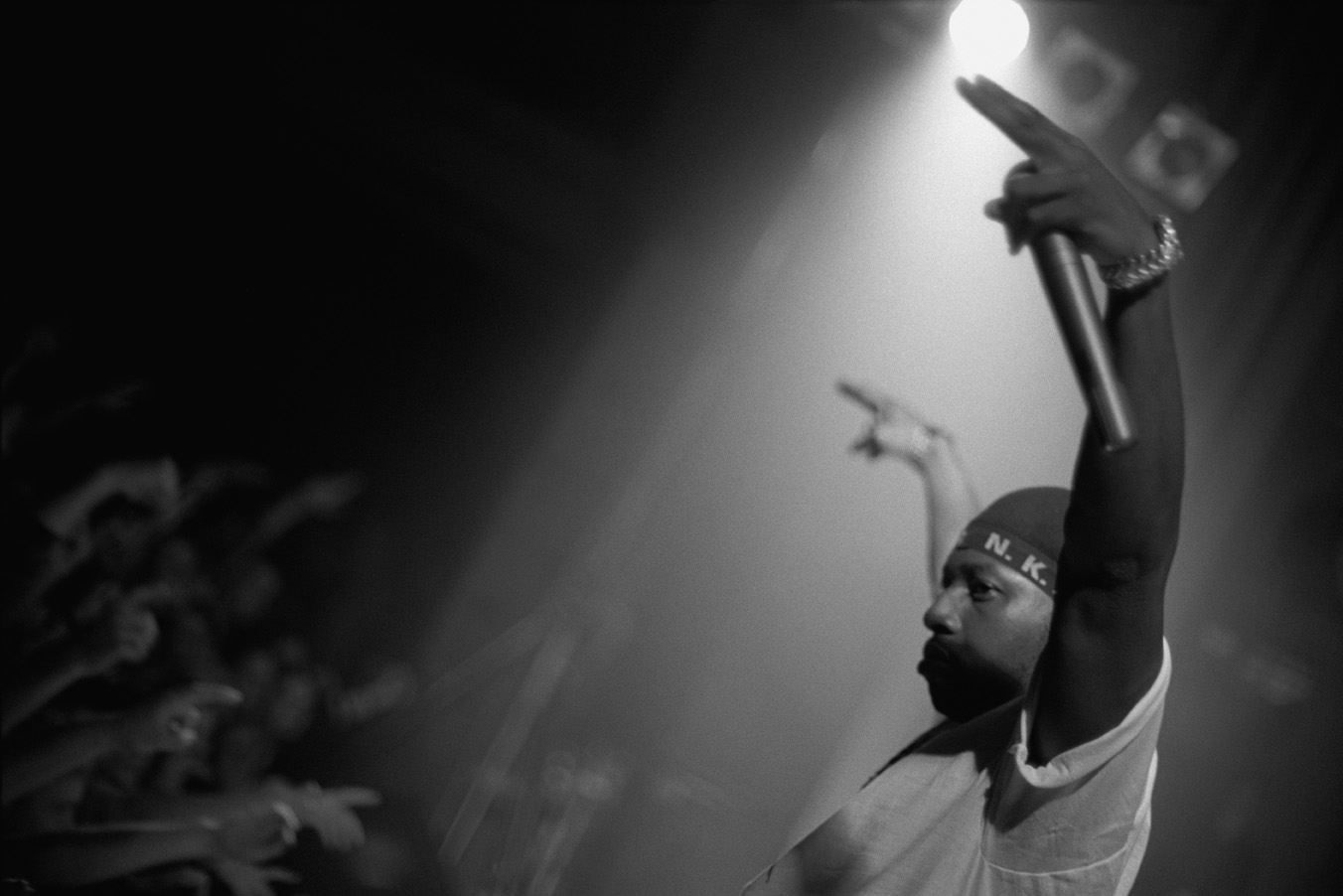
Gravediggaz performing in 1997

The group's first album was originally titled Niggamortis; however, this potentially risqué title was changed to 6 Feet Deep for the American market (European versions of the album retained the original title, and also included the bonus track "Pass the Shovel"); it was released on August 9, 1994. The four members adopted Gravedigga alter egos for their work with the group: Prince Rakeem became The RZArector; Poetic became The Grym Reaper; Prince Paul became The Undertaker; and Frukwan became The Gatekeeper. In 1995, the three rhyming members (without Prince Paul) released a collaborative EP titled The Hell E.P. with English trip hop artist Tricky.

The second Gravediggaz album The Pick, the Sickle and the Shovel was less humorous, dealing more with social and political issues; it also used calmer and more conventional production. Prince Paul played a considerably smaller role in the making of this album, with many of the production duties eventually taken care of by RZA and his Wu-Tang affiliates (including True Master and 4th Disciple).

A bootleg Gravediggaz album, named Scenes from the Graveyard, surfaced in 1998. It featured seven unreleased tracks plus some remixes from the first two albums.

Gravediggaz recruited DJ Diamond J. Poetic died of colon cancer in July 2001. Frukwan stated in an interview not long after Poetic's death that a new album using leftover Poetic material would be released. Nightmare in A-Minor, the third official album, came out in 2001; it featured two of the original members, Poetic and Frukwan. The album is considered to be the group’s darkest work yet, including many references to Poetic's struggle with cancer, as well as apocalyptic themes to do with the teachings of the Five-Percent Nation. Although RZA did not take part in the album, some Wu-Tang Clan affiliates such as 4th Disciple, True Master, Prodigal Sunn, Beretta 9, and Shogun Assason were involved. The album was mostly produced by Poetic and Frukwan. A different version of the album (minus the song "Better Wake Up") was released in 2002, for which some of the tracks created by Poetic were replaced or altered.

In 2003, Frukwan released his debut solo album, Life. The compilation album, 6 Feet Under, was released in 2004 by X-Ray/Cleopatra Records and featured songs from Nightmare in A-Minor and Life. According to Frukwan, he had nothing to do with the release and claimed that song titles were changed without permission, making it an unauthorized release.

In 2010, Gravediggaz recorded a new song, "2 More Cups of Blood". In 2011, it was announced that the group had been recording new tracks involving Shabazz the Disciple and Killah Priest.

In 2018, the Gatekeeper released "1 Cup of Blood" under the Gravediggaz name.

== Style and influence ==
According to Frukwan, the group's name means "digging graves of the mentally dead, and it stood for resurrecting the mentally dead from their state of unawareness and ignorance." The group's lyrics mix black humor, including topics such as suicide, death, killing, psychopathy, hell, etc.; criticism regarding the music industry; cartoonish violence reminiscent of the Geto Boys, Insane Poetry, or early Three 6 Mafia; and esoteric references to the Nation of Gods and Earths. The group pioneered the horrorcore genre.

The irony used by Gravediggaz has influenced hardcore techno through Mark Newland's sampling of the group's prose in Nasenbluten.

The intro of "Mommy, What's a Gravedigga?" was sampled by Sounwave in Kendrick Lamar's track "Mortal Man".

The Gravediggaz track "2 Cups of Blood" would have its beat reused by Tyler, the Creator in his 2021 track "Lumberjack", after Prince Paul remade the track for Flatbush Zombies, and RZA who also wanted to use the beat.

== Discography ==
=== Studio albums ===
- 6 Feet Deep (1994)
- The Pick, the Sickle and the Shovel (1997)
- Nightmare in A-Minor (2001)

=== Compilation albums ===
- 6 Feet Under (2004)
- Halloween Nights In The Graveyard (2023)
