= The Best of P.M. Dawn =

Compilation album by P.M. Dawn
- Released: June 20, 2000
- Label: V2

P.M. Dawn chronology
Dearest Christian, I'm So Very Sorry for Bringing You Here. Love, Dad (1998)	The Best of P.M. Dawn (2000)	F*cked Music (2000)

Professional ratings
Review scores
Source	Rating
AllMusic	4.5/5 stars
Entertainment Weekly	(A)

The Best of P.M. Dawn is a 2000 compilation album by P.M. Dawn. Along with the group's most successful recordings, it includes remixes of some of their minor hits and "Gotta Be...Movin' on Up" (from the 1998 comedy film Senseless starring Marlon Wayans and David Spade) performed by Attrell Cordes of P.M. Dawn, featuring Ky-Mani Marley and John Forté.

== Track listing ==
1. "Set Adrift on Memory Bliss" (radio edit)
2. "Paper Doll"
3. "I'd Die Without You"
4. "Looking Through Patient Eyes"
5. "The Ways of the Wind"
6. "Downtown Venus"
7. "Sometimes I Miss You So Much"
8. "Gotta Be...Movin' On Up"
9. "Being So Not for You (I Had No Right)"
10. "Faith in You"
11. "A Watcher's Point of View (Don't 'Cha Think)" (Todd Terry's Hard House Mix)
12. "The Ways of the Wind" (Main 7in)
13. "Reality Used to Be a Friend of Mine" (CJ Macintosh 7in Edit)
14. "Gotta Be...Movin' On Up" (Morales Radio Edit)
