= Peace in the Valley (disambiguation) =

Peace in the Valley is a 1939 song written by Thomas A. Dorsey, originally for Mahalia Jackson.

Peace in the Valley may also refer to:

- Peace in the Valley (EP), an EP by Elvis Presley (1957)
- Peace in the Valley: The Complete Gospel Recordings, a box set compiling recordings by Elvis Presley (2000)
- Peace in the Valley (Jo Stafford album) (1963)
- Peace in the Valley (Daniel O'Donnell album) (2009)
- Peace, or Peace (In the Valley), 1991 song by Sabrina Johnston
