= A Watcher's Point of View (Don't 'Cha Think) =

1991 single by P.M. Dawn

Single by P.M. Dawn

from the album Of the Heart, of the Soul and of the Cross: The Utopian Experience
- Released: May 27, 1991
- Genre: Hip hop; pop; funk
- Label: Gee Street; Island
- Songwriters: Tom Johnston; Attrell Cordes
- Producer: P.M. Dawn

P.M. Dawn singles chronology
"Ode to a Forgetful Mind" (1989)	"A Watcher's Point of View (Don't 'Cha Think)" (1991)	"Set Adrift on Memory Bliss" (1991)

"A Watcher's Point of View (Don't 'Cha Think)" is a song by American musical group P.M. Dawn, released in May 1991 by Gee Street and Island Records as a single from their debut album, Of the Heart, of the Soul and of the Cross: The Utopian Experience (1991). The song peaked at number 36 on the UK Singles Chart and number 44 on the US Billboard Hot Dance Music/Club Play chart in 1991. Writing credit is given to Attrell Cordes (Prince Be of P.M. Dawn) and Tom Johnston of the Doobie Brothers as the song contains a sample of the Doobie Brothers' "Feelin' Down Farther".

Todd Terry's "Hard House Mix" of the song appeared on P.M. Dawn's 2000 compilation, The Best of P.M. Dawn. The song references "Pleasant Valley Sunday" by Gerry Goffin and Carole King, as performed by the Monkees in 1967.

== Critical reception ==
Steve Huey from AllMusic stated that the song is "surprisingly funky and driving". Another editor, Hal Horowitz, noted the "edgy hip-hop". Larry Flick from Billboard magazine wrote, "Rap act deftly intermingles elements of raw hip-hop, Beatles-esque pop, and '70s-era funk. Icing on the cake is intelligent, well-paced rhymes; which makes this simply irresistible. Already hailed by U.K. critics and consumers, cut deserves immediate attention at urban and pop radio." Andrew Smith from Melody Maker described it as "a loping, breezy piece, replete with subtly locomotive guitar, sub-doo wop backing vocals and articulately unintelligible lyrics." Russell Brown from Record Mirror named it a "smooth, pulsing single", adding, "Layered like a rock record and lean like a rap record, 'A Watcher's Point of View' will attract comparisons like flies, but in spirit there's as much in common with Lenny Kravitz than with any "new age" rap group you could name."

== Charts ==
Chart (1991)	Peak position
UK Singles (OCC)	36
UK Airplay (Music Week)	55
UK Dance (Music Week)	9
UK Club Chart (Record Mirror)	32
US Hot Dance Music/Club Play (Billboard)	44

Chart (1992)	Peak position
UK Club Chart (Music Week) with "Reality Used to Be a Friend of Mine"	4
