= Red Hot + Dance =

- The cover features artwork by Keith Haring

Compilation album by various artists
- Released: July 6, 1992
- Genre: Dance
- Length: 65:44
- Labels: Epic; Sony Music
- Producers: The Basement Boys; Sly Dunbar; Robbie Shakespeare; George Michael; Todd Terry; David Morales; Young Disciples

Red Hot Benefit series chronology
Red Hot + Blue (1990)	Red Hot + Dance (1992)	No Alternative (1993)

Singles from Red Hot + Dance
- 1. "Too Funky" Released: June 1, 1992

Professional ratings
Review scores
Source	Rating
AllMusic	3/5 stars
Chicago Tribune	3/4 stars
Deseret News	2.5/4 stars
Entertainment Weekly	(favorable)
Los Angeles Times	3/4 stars

Red Hot + Dance is an album produced by the Red Hot Organization, an organization dedicated to raising money and awareness to fight the onslaught of HIV/AIDS. It was released on July 6, 1992. British singer-songwriter George Michael was instrumental in bringing the project to fruition and the album was notable for featuring three new songs by him. Originally earmarked for a follow-up to the album Listen Without Prejudice Vol. 1, the tracks were instead donated to this LP. Apart from "Too Funky", which was released as a charity single (along with a video featuring several supermodels), these tracks were exclusive to this album.

Michael later brought legal action against record label Sony, citing their lack of support for this project as one of the reasons he no longer wished to work with them. The album also included tracks by Madonna, Seal, Lisa Stansfield and Sly & the Family Stone, and was released by Epic (Sony) in the UK. The album cover features artwork by Keith Haring.

== Background and release ==
The Red Hot + Dance project began as a series of live club events in London, New York City, Paris, Berlin, Rome, Los Angeles, Toronto, Dublin, Dallas and Tokyo to commemorate World AIDS Day on December 1, 1991. Many of the events were filmed; in each city, directors filmed live performers like EMF, Seal, P.M. Dawn, Lisa Stansfield, Jimmy Somerville, Young Disciples, Monie Love and Dream Warriors, which formed the backbone of the show and enabled it to be financed. As with Red Hot + Blue, an album tied into the Red Hot + Dance theme was put together with the intention to re-create the excitement of a club. Some of the best remixers and producers available were invited to take some of the biggest hits at the time and funk them up.

The project also needed a superstar to spearhead the album and generate proper heat to sell enough records. English singer-songwriter George Michael donated three new tracks, originally intended for his next album; "Too Funky", "Do You Really Want to Know" and "Happy". With the help of his manager, a deal with Sony Music was reached and they would also be distributing the album and a home video. The album ended up being a showcase for one of the most influential and distinctive aspects of contemporary music, the remix. And it was the first major-label release devoted to the art of the mix.

== Critical reception ==
AllMusic editor Ted Mills noted that Nellee Hooper's remix of the Young Disciples' "Apparently Nothin'" "strips the original down to beat and sparse keys", while Todd Terry "has the unenviable task of remixing Sly Stone's "Thank You (Falettinme Be Mice Elf Agin)" without any access to studio tapes". J.D. Considine from The Baltimore Sun highlighted having Brian Eno rework EMF's "Unbelievable" and Frankie Knuckles remixing Lisa Stansfield's "Change". Mitchell May from Chicago Tribune also praised the new take on "Unbelievable", calling it the "most adventuresome piece" of the album and noting that the remixer had reconstructed the song "to create something entirely new." He added further that Sly and Robbie "manage to have a little fun" with Madonna's "Supernatural", while Richie Rich "solves the thorny problem of remixing a remix" on P.M. Dawn's "Set Adrift on Memory Bliss", "by simply replacing the sleepy drum track of the "original" with his own hyperkinetic creation."

Ray Boren from Deseret News suggested that the new EMF remix be retitled "Unrecognizable", adding that "this new variety show seems more likely to power a party than its clever predecessor." Amy Linden from Entertainment Weekly wrote, "Luckily, on the level of both charity and artistry, this crash course in beats does its job." Dennis Hunt from Los Angeles Times noted Michael's three "sizzling" new tracks, stating that "Too Funky" "ranks with his best and is an indication that he should focus on dance music." Peter Howell from Toronto Star felt "Supernatural" is "nothing special", saying it's reminiscent of Madonna's "Like a Prayer". He also highlighted the remix of "Unbelievable", that "is worth the album price alone, because it is highly danceable and it buries the vocals of that annoying group. Think of this as Saturday Night Fever for the '90s." Joe Brown from The Washington Post remarked that George Michael had generously donated three tracks, including "Too Funky", "which conspicuously fails to live up to its title." He complimented "Supernatural", that "offers an interesting lyric for a change", but felt the producers "chain her to a tired "Pull Up to the Bumper" beat." Brown also complimented Knuckles's "elegantly spare remix" of "Change", Young Disciples' "Stevie Wonder-ful" "Apparently Nothin'" and Sabrina Johnston's "gospel-fired" "Peace" and Eno's "ambient house" treatment of "Unbelievable", "which explores sonic textures and territories without undermining danceability."

== Track listing ==
No.	Title	Writer(s)	Artist(s)	Length
1.	"Too Funky"	George Michael	George Michael	5:36
2.	"Do You Really Want to Know"	George Michael	George Michael	4:48
3.	"Happy"	George Michael	George Michael	4:04
4.	"Supernatural" (Original Arms House Mix)	Madonna, Patrick Leonard	Madonna	5:39
5.	"Crazy" (If I Was Trev Mix)	Seal, Guy Sigsworth	Seal	5:44
6.	"Set Adrift on Memory Bliss" (Richie Rich Mix)	Attrell Cordes, Gary Kemp	P.M. Dawn	5:17
7.	"Change" (Metamorphosis Mix)	Lisa Stansfield, Andy Morris	Lisa Stansfield	5:16
8.	"Apparently Nothing" (The Re-Rub)	Carleen Anderson, Marco Nelson, Mark Alan Nelson	Young Disciples	4:52
9.	"Peace" (Nu-Mix)	Sabrina Johnston	Sabrina Johnston	5:41
10.	"Thank You (Falettinme Be Mice Elf Agin)" (Todds CD Mix)	Sylvester "Sly Stone" Stewart	Sly & the Family Stone	4:19
11.	"Gypsy Woman" (Joey Negro's Mindmix)	Crystal Waters, Neal Conway, Curtis Mayfield	Crystal Waters	5:19
12.	"Unbelievable" (The Hovering Feet Mix)	James Atkin, Derry Brownson, Mark de Cloedt, Ian Dench, Zac Foley	EMF	5:03
13.	"Theme From Red Hot & Dance" (Gothic Mix)	Andy Milburn & Tom Hajdu	tomandandy	4:06
