= The Great White Hype (soundtrack) =

Music from the Motion Picture: The Great White Hype

Soundtrack album by various artists
- Released: April 30, 1996
- Recorded: 1995–96
- Genre: Hip hop
- Length: 52:58
- Label: Epic Soundtrax
- Producer: Reginald Hudlin (exec.); DJ U-Neek; Marcus Miller; RZA; 4th Disciple; Doug Rasheed; Foster & McElroy; Insane Clown Posse; Jocko; Mike E. Clark; P.M. Dawn; Ski; Studio Ton

Singles from The Great White Hype
- 1. "Coolie High" Released: 1995

Music from the Motion Picture: The Great White Hype is the soundtrack to Reginald Hudlin's 1996 film The Great White Hype. It was released in April 1996 through Epic Soundtrax, and consists primarily of hip hop music. Composed of thirteen songs, it features appearances by the likes of Ambersunshower, Biz Markie, Bone Thugs-n-Harmony, Camp Lo, DJ U-Neek, E-40, Insane Clown Posse, Jamie Foxx, Lou Rawls, Marcus Miller, Nyt Owl, Passion, Premier, Rudy Ray Moore, and Wu-Tang Clan members. Production was handled by DJ U-Neek, Marcus Miller, RZA, 4th Disciple, Doug Rasheed, Foster & McElroy, ICP, Jocko, Mike E. Clark, P.M. Dawn, Ski Beatz and Studio Ton.

The album peaked at number 93 on the Billboard 200, number 27 on the Top R&B/Hip-Hop Albums in the United States. Its lead single, Camp Lo's "Coolie High", peaked at #62 on the Hot R&B/Hip-Hop Songs and #25 on the Hot Rap Songs.

== Track listing ==
No.	Title	Writer(s)	Producer(s)	Length
1.	"Movin' On" (performed by DJ U-Neek and Nyt Owl)	A. Lennox; D. Stewart; T. Middleton; Nyt Owl	DJ U-Neek	4:11
2.	"Baller's Lady" (performed by Passion and E-40)	P. Broussard; K. Irving; M. Whitman; E. Stevens; V. Webb	Studio Ton; Kirv (co.)	3:42
3.	"Shoot 'Em Up" (performed by Bone Thugs-n-Harmony)	T. Middleton; Bone Thugs-n-Harmony	DJ U-Neek	5:18
4.	"If It's Alright With You" (performed by Cappadonna and U-God)	D. Hill; L. Hawkins	4th Disciple	3:34
5.	"Who's the Champion" (performed by Ghostface Killah and RZA)	R. Diggs, Jr.; D. Coles	RZA	3:41
6.	"Coolie High" (performed by Camp Lo)	A. Roberts; A. Willis; S. Wallace; S. Wilds	Jocko; Ski	4:00
7.	"Running Song" (performed by Ambersunshower)	A. Smith; A. Cordes; C. Mcintosh; J. Eugene; S. Nichol	P.M. Dawn; Thomas "Tikk Takk" Piper (add.)	4:24
8.	"Knocked Nekked (From the Waist Down)" (performed by Jamie Foxx and Dolemite)	D. Rasheed; E. Bishop; R. Moore	Doug Rasheed	4:35
9.	"We Got It" (performed by Premier)	T. McElroy; D. Foster	Denzil Foster; Thomas McElroy	3:57
10.	"I've Got You Under My Skin" (performed by Lou Rawls and Biz Markie)	C. Porter	Marcus Miller	3:58
11.	"Bring the Pain" (performed by Method Man)	C. Smith; R. Diggs, Jr.	RZA	3:17
12.	"And I Love You" (performed by Marcus Miller)	W. Miller, Jr.; D. Ward	Marcus Miller	4:38
13.	"Chicken Huntin' (Slaughterhouse No Blood Radio Mix)" (performed by Insane Clown Posse)	J. Bruce; J. Utsler; M. Clark; D. Greenburg; H. Dodd; M. Niles	Mike E. Clark; Insane Clown Posse	3:42
Total length:				52:58

Notes

- Track 1 is based on "Sweet Dreams (Are Made of This)" written by Annie Lennox and Dave Stewart
- Track 3 contains a sample of "Let's Fall in Love" written by The Isley Brothers and Chris Jasper
- Track 6 contains a sample of Funny How Time Flies (When You're Having Fun) perform by Janet Jackson
- Track 7 contains a sample of "Hangin' on a String" performed by the Loose Ends

== Charts ==
Chart (1996)	Peak position
US Billboard 200	93
US Top R&B/Hip-Hop Albums (Billboard)	27
