= New Kingdom (band) =

American rap rock duo

- Origin: New York City
- Genres: Psychedelic rap; rap rock
- Years active: 1987–1996
- Labels: Gee Street; Island; PolyGram
- Past members: Nosaj; Sebastian

New Kingdom was an American rap rock duo from New York City consisting of Jason 'Nosaj' Furlow and Sebastian Laws. Formed in 1987, New Kingdom was known for its psychedelic, funk, and blues-influenced style and abstract lyricism. The duo released two albums on Gee Street Records in 1992 and 1996.

== Biography ==
Group members Furlow and Laws met in New York City, boosting from the vintage clothing store in New York City at which they both worked. Laws had previously been in hardcore bands centred around CBGBs, and Furlow met Scott Harding while helping a friend record a demo at Calliope Studios.

The two rappers began writing rhymes and marking records with Post-It notes, which Harding would sample and compile into backing tracks for the pair.

Harding helped the group develop its sound and introduced the duo to Jon Baker of Gee Street Records, which officially signed the act in 1992. After two years on a demo deal, New Kingdom released its debut album, Heavy Load, in 1993. Allmusic's Bret Love wrote of the album, "Heavy Load shows an awful lot of promise, but all too often New Kingdom fails to deliver."

New Kingdom released its second album, Paradise Don't Come Cheap, in 1996. Allmusic writer Ned Raggett, who gave the album 4 out of 5 stars and selected the album as the site's Album Pick, wrote, "[The album] arguably beats out the fine debut Heavy Load—there's something even more belligerent, raunchy, and fiery about Furlow and Laws this time out." However, The San Diego Union-Tribune writer Jeff Niesel wrote, "[It's] a clunky affair."

The group was more successful in Baker’s native UK than their own United States, where they were met with miscategorisation and industry indifference. The band were a significant influence on the emerging UK trip-hop scene - Tricky spent time in the studio with the group, learning their methods, while Morcheeba attended New Kingdom’s concerts and later collaborated with Furlow on record and in live performances. After releasing two albums, the band split up, feeling they had accomplished everything they'd set out to do.

== Musical style ==
New Kingdom was praised for its unique sound and performance style. New Kingdom's musical style combines elements of hard rock, psychedelic music, funk, and blues. The group's live performances featured a disc jockey and live instrumentation by a guitarist, a drummer, and a percussionist, as well as a masked dancer. For the Paradise Don't Come Cheap tour, both Furlow and John Medeski played guitars for the band. The lyrical content of Nosaj and Sebastian is often abstract and ranges from autobiographical subjects to science-fiction fantasies. References made by the band range from Bruce Lee and Super Fly to the folklore of Paul Bunyan. Nosaj and Sebastian's rhymes are often unintelligible.

Sebastian was previously a member of some local hardcore punk bands, and Nosaj was primarily influenced by Curtis Mayfield. The San Diego Union-Tribune writer Jeff Niesel described New Kingdom's music as a cross between Wu-Tang Clan and the Jon Spencer Blues Explosion, while Allmusic's Bret Love compared the group to Beastie Boys and Onyx. The New York Times writer Jon Pareles compared New Kingdom to rap-rock fusions by artists such as Run-D.M.C., Public Enemy, Anthrax, Cypress Hill, and Wu-Tang Clan. MTV News said that "New Kingdom make rap rock hard as hell by mixing acid noise with funky, pea soup-thick beats and detective show horns". In his review of Paradise Don't Come Cheap, Allmusic writer Ned Raggett wrote, "[The group's sound compares with] a Goodie Mob/Bubba Sparxxx collaboration produced by the RZA—or, say, Eminem's "Square Dance" completely gone to hell—well before its time" and concluded that the only easy comparison between New Kingdom and another musical act is Wu-Tang Clan.

== Discography ==
- Heavy Load (1993)
- Paradise Don't Come Cheap (1996)
