= Jesus Wept =

Studio album by P.M. Dawn
- Released: October 3, 1995
- Recorded: March–July 1995
- Genres: Hip-hop; psychedelic rap
- Length: 61:21
- Label: Gee Street
- Producer: Eric Kupper

P.M. Dawn chronology
The Bliss Album...? (1993)	Jesus Wept (1995)	Dearest Christian, I'm So Very Sorry for Bringing You Here. Love, Dad (1998)

Professional ratings
Review scores
Source	Rating
AllMusic	4/5 stars
Christgau's Consumer Guide	(3-star Honorable Mention)
Entertainment Weekly	A−
The Guardian	4/5 stars
Houston Chronicle	4/5 stars
Los Angeles Times	3.5/4 stars
Muzik	4.5/5
NME	5/10
Rolling Stone	4/5 stars
Select	3/5
Spin	5/10

Jesus Wept is the third album by American hip-hop group P.M. Dawn. It was released in October 1995 via Gee Street Records, and was unable to attain the success of the group's first two albums, Of the Heart, of the Soul and of the Cross: The Utopian Experience and The Bliss Album...? (Vibrations of Love and Anger and the Ponderance of Life and Existence).

The album's highest charting single was "Downtown Venus", which contained a sample of Deep Purple's "Hush". The single reached number 48 on the Billboard Hot 100 and crossed over to alternative radio, resulting in the song peaking at number 39 on the Billboard Modern Rock Tracks chart.

== Music samples ==
Noteworthy samples from this album include: "4 O'Clock in the Morning" by The Hassles in "My Own Personal Gravity", "Pacific" by 808 State in "I'll be Waiting for You", "Don't Interrupt the Sorrow" by Joni Mitchell in "Forever Damaged (The 96th)", "Nite and Day" by Al B. Sure! in "Sometimes I Miss You So Much" and "Mama Told Me Not to Come" by Three Dog Night in "Fantasia's Confidential Ghetto: 1999/Once in a Lifetime/Coconut". The track also contains a musical reference to The Beatles song, "Flying".

== Track listing ==
Songwriting credit is given to Attrell Cordes on each song along with whoever is being sampled with the exception of "Silence...Recorded at the Gravesite of Rev. Dr. Martin Luther King Jr.", which is, as the title suggests, 21 seconds of silence. It received no song writing credit.

No.	Title	Writer(s)	Length
1.	"Intro"	Attrell S. Cordes	1:39
2.	"Downtown Venus"	A. Cordes; Joe South	3:32
3.	"My Own Personal Gravity"	A. Cordes; W. Joel	5:26
4.	"I'll Be Waiting for You"	A. Cordes; G. Massey; M. Price; G. Simpson	4:26
5.	"Forever Damaged (The 96th)"	A. Cordes; J. Mitchell	3:09
6.	"Apathy...Superstar! ?"	A. Cordes	4:28
7.	"The Puppet Show"	A. Cordes	4:04
8.	"Silence...Recorded at the Gravesite of Rev. Dr. Martin Luther King Jr."		0:21
9.	"Why God Loves You"	A. Cordes; C. Greider	4:09
10.	"Miles from Anything"	A. Cordes	5:08
11.	"The 9:45 Wake-Up Dream"	A. Cordes	4:50
12.	"Sonchyenne"	A. Cordes	3:38
13.	"A Lifetime"	A. Cordes	3:34
14.	"Sometimes I Miss You So Much (Dedicated to the Christ Consciousness)"	A. Cordes; K. West; A. Brown III	4:42
15.	"Fantasia's Confidential Ghetto: 1999/Once in a Lifetime/Coconut"	D. Byrne; Chris Frantz; L. Fulsom; Jerry Harrison; J. McCraklin; Prince; Randy Newman; Harry Nilsson; Tina Weymouth	8:15
Total length:			61:21

== Charts ==
Chart (1995)	Peak position
Australian Albums (ARIA)	108
US Billboard 200	119
