= Looking Through Patient Eyes =

1993 single by P.M. Dawn

Single by P.M. Dawn

from the album The Bliss Album...? (Vibrations of Love and Anger and the Ponderance of Life and Existence)
- B-side: "Plastic"
- Released: March 1, 1993
- Genre: Pop; hip hop
- Length: 4:09
- Label: Gee Street; Island
- Songwriters: Attrell Cordes; George Michael
- Producer: P.M. Dawn

P.M. Dawn singles chronology
"I'd Die Without You" (1992)	"Looking Through Patient Eyes" (1993)	"Plastic" (1993)

Licensed audio
- "Looking Through Patient Eyes" on YouTube

"Looking Through Patient Eyes" is a song by American hip hop and R&B group P.M. Dawn. It was released on March 1, 1993, by the record label Gee Street as the second single from their second studio album, The Bliss Album...? (Vibrations of Love and Anger and the Ponderance of Life and Existence) (1993). The song, written by P.M. Dawn's Attrell Cordes, features backing vocals by Cathy Dennis and samples "Father Figure" by George Michael. The line "Joni help me, I think I'm falling" is a reference to Canadian singer Joni Mitchell's song "Help Me"; she is also referenced in the group's previous single "Set Adrift on Memory Bliss".

Upon its release, "Looking Through Patient Eyes" became P.M. Dawn's third and final top-ten hit on the US Billboard Hot 100, peaking at number six for two nonconsecutive weeks. On Canada's RPM Top Singles chart, the song reached number one on the issue dated May 29, 1993, becoming the group's only number-one single in Canada. The song also found success in Australia and several European countries, reaching the top 10 in Denmark, Iceland, and Portugal and charting within the top 20 in Australia, Ireland, New Zealand, and the United Kingdom.

== Critical reception ==
Upon the release, Larry Flick from Billboard magazine wrote, "Rap duo is positioned to sail up the charts with a silky pop/hip-hop ditty that derives inspiration from samples of George Michael's 'Father Figure'. A warmly sung chorus cushions the deep-voiced and romantic rhymes that have made the act famous. A fitting way to usher in The Bliss Album." Alan Jones from Music Week described it as "a gently mournful rap", underscored by the instrumental from Michael's song. He also stated that "the sawing violins and some attractive female vocal support all help create a sweet and stylish single."

Sam Steele from NME felt "Looking Through Patient Eyes" could easily be renamed "Listening Through Patient Ears", "as it's only ever going to excite Michael Jackson fans and Radio 4 listeners." People Magazine noted that Prince Be "hooks up his celestial pony" to Michael's song. James Hamilton from the Record Mirror Dance Update named it a "lushly swirled pop swayer" in his weekly dance column. Charles Aaron from Spin wrote, "'I'd Die Without You' was a sop to the mainstream, i.e. it kind of made sense, but this is the "real" shit—George Michael bite and Prince Be's comforting gibberish."

== Music video ==
The accompanying music video for the song was shot in a church, and features various Christian images interspersed throughout it.

== Track listings ==
- US 7-inch single

A. "Looking Through Patient Eyes" (radio edit) – 4:06
B. "The Ways of the Wind" (radio edit) – 3:55

- US 12-inch single

A1. "Looking Through Patient Eyes" (extended mix) – 6:15
B1. "Looking Through Patient Eyes" (radio mix) – 4:06
B2. "Looking Through Patient Eyes" (instrumental) – 4:18

- US CD single
1. "Looking Through Patient Eyes" (radio mix) – 4:06
2. "Looking Through Patient Eyes" (extended mix) – 6:15
3. "Looking Through Patient Eyes" (instrumental) – 4:18
4. "Plastic" (radio mix) – 3:50
- US and Canadian cassette single
1. "Looking Through Patient Eyes" (radio mix) – 4:06
2. "Looking Through Patient Eyes" (album version) – 4:25
- UK 7-inch and cassette single

A. "Looking Through Patient Eyes" (radio mix)
B. "Plastic" (radio mix)

- UK 12-inch single

A1. "Looking Through Patient Eyes" (extended mix)
A2. "Looking Through Patient Eyes" (radio mix)
B1. "Plastic" (12-inch mix)
B2. "Plastic" (Funk U Tomorrow mix)

- UK and Australian CD single
1. "Looking Through Patient Eyes" (radio mix)
2. "Looking Through Patient Eyes" (extended mix)
3. "Plastic" (extended mix)
4. "Plastic" (radio mix)

== Charts ==
=== Weekly charts ===
Chart (1993)	Peak position
Australia (ARIA)	20
Canada Retail Singles (The Record)	2
Canada Top Singles (RPM)	1
Canada Dance/Urban (RPM)	5
Denmark (IFPI)	7
Europe (Eurochart Hot 100)	34
Europe (European Hit Radio)	9
Germany (GfK)	63
Iceland (Íslenski Listinn Topp 40)	6
Ireland (IRMA)	14
Netherlands (Single Top 100 Tipparade)	17
New Zealand (Recorded Music NZ)	11
Portugal (AFP)	7
UK Singles (Official Charts)	11
UK Airplay (Music Week)	6
UK Dance (Music Week)	25
US Billboard Hot 100	6
US Hot R&B Singles (Billboard)	62
US Maxi-Singles Sales (Billboard)	45
US Top 40/Mainstream (Billboard)	2
US Top 40/Rhythm-Crossover (Billboard)	6
US Cash Box Top 100	1

=== Year-end charts ===
Chart (1993)	Position
Australia (ARIA)	99
Canada Top Singles (RPM)	38
Canada Dance/Urban (RPM)	48
Iceland (Íslenski Listinn Topp 40)	58
US Billboard Hot 100	38
US Cash Box Top 100	26

== Release history ==
Region	Date	Format(s)	Label(s)	Ref.
United Kingdom	March 1, 1993	7-inch vinyl; 12-inch vinyl; CD; cassette	Gee Street; Island	
Australia	March 21, 1993	12-inch vinyl; CD; cassette	Gee Street; Island	
