= Downtown Venus =

1995 single by P.M. Dawn

Single by P.M. Dawn

from the album Jesus Wept
- B-side: "She Dreams Persistent Maybes"
- Released: August 22, 1995
- Studio: Bliss
- Genre: Rock
- Length: 3:40
- Label: Gee Street; Island
- Songwriters: Joe South; Attrell Cordes
- Producer: P.M. Dawn

P.M. Dawn singles chronology
"You Got Me Floatin'" (1993)	"Downtown Venus" (1995)	"Sometimes I Miss You So Much (Dedicated to the Christ-Consciousness)" (1995)

Audio
- "Downtown Venus" on YouTube

"Downtown Venus" is the first single released from American hip hop-R&B act P.M. Dawn's third studio album, Jesus Wept (1995). The second track on the album, the song was written by the duo's lead vocalist, Prince Be (under his real name, Attrell Cordes) and produced by P.M. Dawn. It is built around a sample of "Hush" by Deep Purple, so writer Joe South was given a writing credit.

Released on August 22, 1995, by Gee Street and Island Records, "Downtown Venus" did not replicate the success of the band's previous singles, peaking at number 48 on the US Billboard Hot 100 and number 58 in the United Kingdom. Because of its guitar-driven rock sound, the song was serviced to alternative radio stations and reached number 39 on the Billboard Modern Rock Tracks chart, marking P.M. Dawn's only appearance on the listing.

== Composition ==
"Downtown Venus" is heavily built on a sample of the 1967 song "Hush", written by Joe South, as covered by English rock band Deep Purple in 1968. Billboard magazine editor Paul Verna has described the track as a rock song with pop and R&B tones. Larry Flick of the same publication compared the song's vocals to those of John Lennon and noted its "psychedelic" guitar chords.

== Release and commercial performance ==
Before the song was sent to contemporary hit radio (CHR), Gee Street Records and Island Records decided to service the track to alternative radio stations first, as they wanted to demonstrate that P.M. Dawn could stray from their established pop sound; this was done during late August and early September, and the song was added to rhythmic contemporary radio and CHR on August 22, 1995. In Australia, a CD and cassette single were released on October 2, 1995, while in Japan, a CD was issued on October 16.

"Downtown Venus" became P.M. Dawn's only song to appear on the US Billboard Modern Rock Tracks chart, on which it peaked at number 39 in September 1995. Following the single's physical release as well as additions to CHR playlists, the song reached number 48 on the Billboard Hot 100 and number 21 on the Billboard Top 40/Mainstream chart in early October. It did not fare well internationally, stalling at number 43 in Canada, number 58 in the United Kingdom, and number 73 in Australia.

== Critical reception ==
Dave Jennings from Melody Maker wrote, "'Downtown Venus' is, amazingly, giddily upbeat and downright urgent. I'm trying to be by myself.../You could be into you/But you don't know what you're like, sings Prince Be in a fine display of introspection turned into inspired action. It positively froths over with radio-friendliness and everyday friendliness, and this time it shouldn't be just the Prince's analyst who'll understand." Paul Moody from NME said, "This time our man throws a dash of Deep Purple's 'Hush' into the usual stream of (sub)consciousness burble and comes up, erm, trumps! You would be into you/But you don't know what you're like! croons Sir Be in a coquettish Prince-like whisper. Swoon. A hit!"

== Track listings ==
- US 7-inch and cassette single

A. "Downtown Venus" (album version) – 3:40
B. "She Dreams Persistent Maybes" – 3:35

- US CD single
1. "Downtown Venus" (album version) – 3:40
2. "Downtown Venus" (Kiss My Wife mix) – 5:12
3. "She Dreams Persistent Maybes" – 3:35
- UK, Australasian, and Japanese CD single
1. "Downtown Venus" (original version) – 3:40
2. "Downtown Venus" (Kiss My Wife mix) – 5:12
3. "Downtown Venus" (I Wanna Be into You mix) – 5:07
4. "She Dreams Persistent Maybes" – 3:35

== Credits and personnel ==
Credits are taken from the US CD single liner notes.

Studio

- Recorded at Bliss Studios

Personnel

- Prince Be – wrtting (as Attrell Cordes), vocals
- Joe South – writing ("Hush")
- Cameron Greider – electric and acoustic guitars, bass guitar
- P.M. Dawn – production
- Michael Fossenkemper – mixing

== Charts ==
Chart (1995)	Peak position
Australia (ARIA)	73
Canada Top Singles (RPM)	43
Europe (European Hit Radio)	39
UK Singles (Official Charts)	58
US Billboard Hot 100	48
US Modern Rock Tracks (Billboard)	39
US Top 40/Mainstream (Billboard)	21
