= I'd Die Without You =

1992 single by P.M. Dawn

Single by P.M. Dawn

from the album Boomerang: Original Soundtrack Album
- B-side: "On a Clear Day"
- Released: September 4, 1992
- Genre: R&B
- Length: 4:11 (album version); 3:48 (radio edit)
- Label: Gee Street; LaFace
- Songwriter: Attrell Cordes
- Producer: P.M. Dawn

P.M. Dawn singles chronology
"Paper Doll" (1992)	"I'd Die Without You" (1992)	"Looking Through Patient Eyes" (1993)

"I'd Die Without You" is a song by American R&B duo P.M. Dawn, first appearing on the soundtrack of the 1992 film Boomerang, starring Eddie Murphy, and was one of several songs to chart from the album. Later, the song was released on the duo's second album, The Bliss Album...? (1993), as well as on their 2000 greatest hits collection, The Best of P.M. Dawn.

"I'd Die Without You" was released in September 1992 by Gee Street and LaFace Records as the third single from the Boomerang soundtrack. It peaked at number three on the US Billboard Hot 100 and number two on the Billboard Top 40/Mainstream and Top 40/Rhythm-Crossover charts in 1992. The Recording Industry Association of America (RIAA) awarded the song a gold certification in November 1992 for selling over 500,000 copies. Internationally, the single peaked at number 10 in Canada and reached the top 50 in Australia, New Zealand and the United Kingdom.

== Critical reception ==
Connie Johnson from Los Angeles Times named "I'd Die Without You" one of the group's "best tracks", noting that it "reveal a gentle, emotional-guy sensitivity". Steve Sutherland from NME wrote, "There's a movie tie-in here (Boomerang, the new Eddie Murphy) so there's every chance 'I'd Die Without You' will be a hit. Deserves it, anyway. It's cool. Gossamer, slinky, focused, unfussed — what a treat to hear a song that takes its time and doesn't give a toss for the bpms and the clubs. What a treat to hear an understated vocal." An editor from People Magazine described the song as "soulful" and "exquisite".

== Track listings ==
- US 12-inch single

A1. "I'd Die Without You" (extended Jeep mix) – 4:42
A2. "I'd Die Without You" (remix dub) – 5:10
B1. "I'd Die Without You" (remix instrumental) – 4:15
B2. "I'd Die Without You" (extended remix radio edit) – 4:15

- US CD and cassette single
1. "I'd Die Without You" (extended remix radio edit) – 4:15
2. "I'd Die Without You" (extended Jeep mix) – 4:42
3. "I'd Die Without You" (remix dub) – 5:10
4. "I'd Die Without You" (remix instrumental) – 4:15
5. "I'd Die Without You" (album version) – 4:11
- US and Canadian cassette single
1. "I'd Die Without You" (radio edit)
2. "On a Clear Day" (radio edit)
- UK 7-inch and cassette single
1. "I'd Die Without You"
2. "On a Clear Day" (HEvian mix)
- UK 12-inch single

A1. "I'd Die Without You"
B1. "On a Clear Day" (extended)
B2. "On a Clear Day" (7-inch remix)

- UK, Australian, and Japanese CD single
1. "I'd Die Without You"
2. "On a Clear Day" (HEvian mix)
3. "On a Clear Day" (HEvian club mix)
4. "I'd Die Without You" (LP version)

== Charts ==
=== Weekly charts ===
Chart (1992–1993)	Peak position
Australia (ARIA)	42
Canada Top Singles (RPM)	10
Europe (Eurochart Hot 100)	84
Europe (European Dance Radio)	15
Germany (GfK)	85
Iceland (Íslenski Listinn Topp 40)	40
Netherlands (Dutch Top 40 Tipparade)	8
Netherlands (Single Top 100)	53
New Zealand (Recorded Music NZ)	38
UK Singles (Official Charts)	30
UK Airplay (Music Week)	16
UK Dance (Music Week)	41
US Billboard Hot 100	3
US Hot R&B Singles (Billboard)	16
US Top 40/Mainstream (Billboard)	2
US Top 40/Rhythm-Crossover (Billboard)	2

=== Year-end charts ===
Chart (1992)	Position
Canada Top Singles (RPM)	92
US Billboard Hot 100	51

Chart (1993)	Position
US Billboard Hot 100	43
US Cash Box Top 100	16

== Certifications ==
Region	Certification	Certified units/sales
United States (RIAA)	Gold	500,000^{^}
^{^} Shipments figures based on certification alone.

== Release history ==
Region	Date	Format(s)	Label(s)	Ref.
United States	September 4, 1992	12-inch vinyl; CD; cassette	Gee Street; LaFace	
United Kingdom	October 26, 1992	7-inch vinyl; 12-inch vinyl; CD; cassette	Gee Street; Island	
Australia	November 2, 1992	12-inch vinyl; CD; cassette	Island	
Japan	November 26, 1992	CD	Gee Street; Island	
