= Heavy Load (album) =

Studio album by New Kingdom
- Released: 1993
- Genre: Hip-hop
- Labels: Gee Street; 4th & B’way/Island; PolyGram
- Producers: Scott Harding; New Kingdom; Lumberjacks

New Kingdom chronology
Heavy Load (1993)	Paradise Don't Come Cheap (1996)

Heavy Load is the first album by the musical duo New Kingdom, released in 1993.

The singles "Good Times" and "Cheap Thrills" made the top 100 on the UK Singles Chart. The group supported the album with several live dates, including shows with Royal Trux.

== Production ==
The album was produced by Scott Harding, New Kingdom, and the Lumberjacks. It was recorded in Manhattan. "Mother Nature" examines ecological themes.

== Critical reception ==
Professional ratings
Review scores
Source	Rating
AllMusic	3/5 stars
Calgary Herald	B
The Encyclopedia of Popular Music	2/5 stars
MusicHound Rock: The Essential Album Guide	3.5/5 stars

Vibe called the album "a celebration of the black-light world of the subconscious," noting the "drug-induced lyrics swimming through a jazzmospheric haze." Spin thought that the group "could be Cypress Hill's geeky, inward-peeking younger brothers." The Santa Fe New Mexican noted that Heavy Load features some "newer elements which have entered into hip-hop, namely black noise, a term used by some critics to describe experimental jazz sounds and various industrial, electronic soundscapes pulsing over the requisite skewed bass lines and funky beats."

The Calgary Herald deemed the album "a happenin' hip-hop funky fury." The Province considered it "a record that favors low, thick, swinging rhythms over big beats, storytelling over boasting, characterization over gangsta posturing." The Boston Herald wrote that the group "turn a pop-music grab bag, with samples of Miles Davis, Grand Funk and others, into ... metallic R&B."

AllMusic wrote that "songs like 'Mad Mad World' and 'Mighty Maverick' work especially well, with Sebastian's trippy spoken-word poetry matching the psychedelic musical backgrounds to create the drugged-out feel the band seems to strive for." In a retrospective article, The Village Voice praised the "dusty sonic patina that was fond of incorporating reverse reverb," writing that "at times, New Kingdom resonated like a psychedelic Wu-Tang."

== Track listing ==
No.	Title	Length
1.	"Good Times"	2:38
2.	"Headhunter"	2:25
3.	"Frontman"	3:08
4.	"Mad Mad World"	1:43
5.	"Mama and Papa"	3:34
6.	"Cheap Thrills"	4:21
7.	"Mars"	3:20
8.	"Are You Alive?"	3:51
9.	"Half Seas Over"	3:45
10.	"Mother Nature"	3:39
11.	"Calico Cats"	2:50
12.	"Mighty Maverick"	5:04
13.	"Lazy Smoke"	3:30

== Personnel ==
- Jason "Nosaj" Furlow – vocals
- Sebastian Laws – vocals
