= Paradise Don't Come Cheap =

Studio album by New Kingdom
- Released: July 9, 1996
- Recorded: 1995–1996
- Genres: Experimental hip hop; East Coast hip hop; abstract hip hop; rap rock; turntablism; psychedelic rap; blues rock; funk rock
- Length: 48:27
- Labels: Gee Street; Island; PolyGram
- Producers: The Lumberjacks; New Kingdom; Scott Harding

New Kingdom chronology
Heavy Load (1993)	Paradise Don't Come Cheap (1996)

Professional ratings
Review scores
Source	Rating
Muzik	3/5 stars

Paradise Don't Come Cheap is the second and most recent album by New Kingdom. It was released on July 9, 1996, on Gee Street Records.

== Track listing ==
1. "Mexico or Bust" – 3:27
2. "Horse Latitudes" – 2:36
3. "Infested" – 3:50
4. "Unicorns Were Horses" – 3:44
5. "Kickin' Like Bruce Lee" – 1:27
6. "Shining Armor" – 3:17
7. "Paradise Don't Come Cheap" – 3:04
8. "Co-Pilot" – 2:50
9. "Big 10 1/2" – 4:20
10. "Valhalla Soothsayer" – 2:21
11. "Animal" – 5:34
12. "Half-Asleep" – 0:53
13. "Terror-Mad Visionary" – 3:17
14. "Suspended in Air" – 4:11
15. "Journey to the Sun" – 3:54
