= The Bliss Album...? (Vibrations of Love and Anger and the Ponderance of Life and Existence) =

Studio album by P.M. Dawn
- Released: March 23, 1993
- Recorded: August–December 1992
- Genres: Pop; hip-hop; pop-rap
- Length: 60:12
- Labels: Gee Street; Island
- Producer: P.M. Dawn

P.M. Dawn chronology
Of the Heart, of the Soul and of the Cross: The Utopian Experience (1991)	The Bliss Album...? (Vibrations of Love and Anger and the Ponderance of Life and Existence) (1993)	Jesus Wept (1995)

Professional ratings
Review scores
Source	Rating
AllMusic	4.5/5 stars
Calgary Herald	A−
Chicago Tribune	3.5/4 stars
Entertainment Weekly	A−
Los Angeles Times	3/4 stars
Music Week	4/5 stars
The Philadelphia Inquirer	3.5/4 stars
Q	4/5 stars
Rolling Stone	4/5 stars
Select	2/5
Spin Alternative Record Guide	8/10
The Village Voice	A

The Bliss Album...? (Vibrations of Love and Anger and the Ponderance of Life and Existence) is the second studio album by American hip-hop duo P.M. Dawn. It was released on March 23, 1993, by Gee Street and Island Records. Although some critics considered it less successful than the duo's first record, The Bliss Album...? received positive reviews and produced two hit singles—"I'd Die Without You" and "Looking Through Patient Eyes". It was voted the 12th best album of 1993 in The Village Voice's annual Pazz & Jop critics poll.

== Music ==
According to music critic David Browne, The Bliss Album...? continues and expands on the mentally stimulating hip-hop of the duo's debut album. Entertainment Weekly said the duo "perfected" the style of pop-rap with their second album, while Spin magazine's J. Matthew Hanna called the music "hip hop pop". The magazine's Craig Marks described the record as "pop nirvana". AllMusic's Steve Huey wrote that it emphasized its predecessor's urban soul sounds, favored melodies rather than raps, and featured both pop and aggressive rap songs. In the opinion of Tom Breihan from Stereogum, "the album serves as an absolute rejection of rap-music values that was, at the time, coming from a group that existed, more or less, within the context of the rap music establishment. It was one big soft, gushy negation".

== Singles ==
Before releasing The Bliss Album...?, P.M. Dawn contributed the single "I'd Die Without You" to the 1992 Eddie Murphy comedy Boomerang and its soundtrack. The top 5 hit was also included on The Bliss Album...?, as was the Billboard Top 10 single "Looking Through Patient Eyes" (featuring backing vocals by Cathy Dennis and sampling George Michael's hit "Father Figure"), the Boy George duet "More Than Likely" and a cover of the Beatles' "Norwegian Wood (This Bird Has Flown)".

== Sampling lawsuit ==
The album also included "So On and So On", which led to a 1999 sampling lawsuit. In the lawsuit Batiste v. Island Records, Inc., Paul and Michael Batiste claimed that P.M. Dawn's song "So On and So On" used unauthorized samples from David Batiste & The Gladiators' "Funky Soul". The fifth Circuit Federal Appellate Court found that the Batistes point to no evidence in the record demonstrating that consumers were confused or deceived by either the use of a digital sample of "Funky Soul" in "So On and So On" or the attribution to David Batiste as a co-author of the track. The Batistes' claim that Paul and Michael Batiste were improperly excluded from the liner notes accompanying the album also failed to suggest that consumers were confused, especially because the liner notes do credit the name of the band in which both Paul and Michael Batiste performed.

== Track listing ==
All lyrics are written by P.M. Dawn except "Norwegian Wood (This Bird Has Flown)" by Lennon-McCartney.

No.	Title	Length
1.	"Intro"	0:49
2.	"When Midnight Sighs"	3:55
3.	"So On and So On"	4:05
4.	"Plastic"	3:48
5.	"The Ways of the Wind"	4:31
6.	"To Love Me More"	4:44
7.	"About Nothing (For the Love of Destiny)"	4:17
8.	"Norwegian Wood (This Bird Has Flown)"	3:15
9.	"Beyond Infinite Affections"	4:13
10.	"Looking Through Patient Eyes"	4:09
11.	"Filthy Rich (I Don't Wanna Be)"	4:08
12.	"More Than Likely" (with Boy George)	4:19
13.	"The Nocturnal Is in the House"	4:20
14.	"When It's Raining Cats and Dogs"	5:35
15.	"I'd Die Without You"	4:10
Total length:		60:12

== Charts ==
=== Weekly charts ===
Weekly chart performance for The Bliss Album...?
Chart (1993)	Peak position
Australian Albums (ARIA)	38
Canada Top Albums/CDs (RPM)	32
UK Albums (Official Charts)	9
US Billboard 200	30
US Top R&B/Hip-Hop Albums (Billboard)	23

=== Year-end charts ===
Year-end chart performance for The Bliss Album...?
Chart (1993)	Position
US Top R&B/Hip-Hop Albums (Billboard)	85

== Certifications ==
Certifications for The Bliss Album...?
Region	Certification	Certified units/sales
Canada (Music Canada)	Gold	50,000^{^}
United Kingdom (BPI)	Silver	60,000^{^}
United States (RIAA)	Gold	500,000^{^}
^{^} Shipments figures based on certification alone.
