= Ambersunshower =

American rapper

- Born: Ambersunshower Nadine Miligros Villenuevo Smith; New York, New York, United States
- Genres: R&B, hip-hop
- Occupation: Musician
- Instrument: Vocals
- Labels: Gee Street/Island/PolyGram Records; Shamalama Music

Ambersunshower (born Ambersunshower Nadine Miligros Villenuevo Smith) is an American R&B singer and former member of the hip-hop duo, Groove Garden.

== Career ==
Ambersunshower has been writing poetry since the age of ten. She was one half of hip-hop duo Groove Garden, alongside DJ Atsushi. Groove Garden was signed by Tommy Boy, and the pair went on to open for Digable Planets on their first national tour. After the dissolution of Groove Garden, Ambersunshower left her label and temporarily retired from music to take care of her ailing grandfather, after whom her debut album, Walter T. Smith, was named. Her first single release in 1996 was the title track from the album.

Gee Street Records released Ambersunshower's debut solo album, Walter T. Smith, in 1996. Mia Dinelly of the popular 1990s Los Angeles zine Female FYI described the album as "stripped down funk with a gritty edge, the lyrics raw testaments of love, delivered in her versatile, sometimes dissonant voice." A single from the album, "Running Song", later appeared on the soundtrack album from the film The Great White Hype, while another song, "Look Around My Window", was included on the Senseless soundtrack. In 2001, she appeared on Tricky's album Blowback, singing on the tracks "Over Me", "You Don't Wanna" and "Your Name". Ambersunshower later returned with a second album, The Turtle Chronicles, released by Shamalama Music on April 17, 2008. That same month, Ambersunshower collaborated with Kenny Baraka on a single entitled "Mortal Deities", the video for which was filmed on location in Brooklyn by Carl Ford for Black Nexxus Films.

== Personal life ==
Ambersunshower is the daughter of actress, writer, and experimental theater director Laurie Carlos (née Smith), one of the original cast members of the Broadway production of Ntozake Shange's For Colored Girls Who Have Considered Suicide When the Rainbow Is Enuf. She is also a chef.

== Discography (as solo artist) ==
=== Albums ===
- Walter T. Smith, 1996
- The Turtle Chronicles, 2008

=== Singles ===
- "Walter T.", 1996
- "Running Song", 1997
- "Rhythm Child", 1997
