= Dearest Christian, I'm So Very Sorry for Bringing You Here. Love, Dad =

Studio album by P.M. Dawn
- Released: October 6, 1998
- Genre: Pop
- Length: 61:30
- Labels: Gee Street; V2

P.M. Dawn chronology
Jesus Wept (1995)	Dearest Christian, I'm So Very Sorry for Bringing You Here. Love, Dad (1998)	The Best of P.M. Dawn (2000)

Professional ratings
Review scores
Source	Rating
AllMusic	3/5 stars
Entertainment Weekly	A−
NME	5/10
Spin	8/10
The Village Voice	A−

Dearest Christian, I'm So Very Sorry for Bringing You Here. Love, Dad is the fourth studio album by American musical duo P.M. Dawn. It was released on October 6, 1998, by Gee Street and V2 Records. The album's title refers to bandmember Attrell Cordes' newborn son, named Christian.

== Critical reception ==
In a contemporary review, Rolling Stone magazine called Dearest Christian "a bleak record that contains the duo's smoothest work since 1993's The Bliss Album...?" and "a masterfully romantic album with no stomach for rhapsodic lies." Keith Phipps of The A.V. Club wrote that the album "confirms the group as one of the most extraordinarily novel acts around." Robert Christgau, writing in The Village Voice, felt that Prince Be composed better as an R&B songwriter for the album than on Jesus Wept and stated, "with a steady band, a sometime collaborator, and the occasional borrowed riff, he revives his spaced-out spirituality as music if not commodity, transfiguring his grumpy disillusion with melodies, vocal harmonies, and now also guitar parts, all lovingly designed to convince his son Christian to be here now."

In a negative review, NME magazine found the music boring and described it as "fluffy-smooth to the point of suffocation; so unswervingly gushy it quickly drives you to distraction." In a retrospective review, AllMusic's Ned Raggett said that some of the songs sound derivative of one another, but that the album "contains beauty, ambition, good songs, rich production, and more, enough to justify its existence when so many of the band's peers had run themselves into the ground."

== Track listing ==
All songs written by Attrell Cordes, except where noted.

No.	Title	Writer(s)	Length
1.	"Music for Carnivores"	Attrell S. Cordes; Roy Phillips	4:34
2.	"Art Deco Halos"	Cordes; Marc Bolan	3:32
3.	"Being So Not for You (I Had No Right)"	Cordes; Clark Anderson	5:26
4.	"Misery in Utero"	Cordes	4:26
5.	"If I Could Be Your Star"	Cordes	4:41
6.	"Yang: As Private I's"	Cordes	4:25
7.	"Screaming at Me"	Cordes	4:53
8.	"I Hate Myself for You"	Cordes	4:21
9.	"No Further Damage"	Cordes; J. Tropea	4:37
10.	"Hale-Bopp Regurgitations"	Cordes	2:50
11.	"Faith in You"	Cordes	4:30
12.	"Broken"	Cordes	4:18
13.	"Untitled"	Cordes; Cameron Greider	8:34
Total length:			61:30

== Charts ==
Chart (1998)	Peak position
Australian Albums (ARIA)	117
