= Senseless =

1998 film directed by Penelope Spheeris

- Theatrical release poster
- Directed by: Penelope Spheeris
- Written by: Greg Erb; Craig Mazin
- Produced by: David Hoberman
- Starring: Marlon Wayans; David Spade; Matthew Lillard; Brad Dourif; Tamara Taylor; Rip Torn
- Cinematography: Daryn Okada
- Edited by: Ross Albert
- Music by: Boris Blank
- Production companies: Dimension Films; Mandeville Films; Gold/Miller Productions
- Distributed by: Miramax Films
- Release date: February 20, 1998
- Running time: 93 minutes
- Country: United States
- Language: English
- Budget: $15 million
- Box office: $13.1 million

Senseless is a 1998 American buddy comedy science fiction film directed by Penelope Spheeris and written by Greg Erb and Craig Mazin. The film stars Marlon Wayans and David Spade alongside Matthew Lillard, Brad Dourif, Tamara Taylor, and Rip Torn.

Senseless was released by Miramax Films on February 20, 1998. The film received negative reviews from critics and was a box office bomb, grossing $13.1 million against a $15 million budget.

== Plot ==
Darryl Witherspoon is an economics student at Stratford University, who does not have the advantages of his wealthy nemesis, Scott Thorpe, or his best friend Tim LaFlour, a straight edge punk rocker who has a hockey scholarship. Darryl is so broke that he donates 4 pints of blood and 4 vials of sperm in one day (playing a different character each time). Darryl's big break comes when he enters a competition, where the winner gets a high-paying Wall Street job. But when Scott enters the competition, it seems Darryl's break has gone down the drain.

Darryl takes on a high-paying experiment to test a drug that enhances the five senses tenfold. Darryl uses it to his advantage, impressing the competition's supervisor, Mr. Tyson, and even joining the hockey team as a goalie. But after taking an extra dose one night to improve his sexual performance with a lover, he experiences side effects. The experiment's supervisor, Dr. Thomas Wheedon, tells Darryl that only four of his senses will work at a time until the drug leaves his body.

As Darryl struggles, Tim thinks that his friend is on heroin and gets worried about him. Darryl's luck then goes down the drain when he loses the hockey game after losing his sight. He also mistakenly professes his love to his girlfriend's father, whom he thinks is his girlfriend, as his sight fails. Her father turns out to be Mr. Tyson. He also acts very clumsily (because of the loss of the ability to see) during the basketball game he is invited to see with a client who needs to be impressed in order for Darryl to score some points with the Smythe-Bates guys. Luckily, the client thinks Darryl is just being funny and signs a contract with the company.

As the story progresses, Darryl asks his friend Tim to help him study for the next day's interview. At that exact moment, Scott studies for the test with the aid of his rich father's employees. Scott is shown to answer a question correctly, but because he does not know the reason, he ignores it. The next day, now dressed in a flashy outfit after going naked and desperate to a clothes seller (as he had been attacked and robbed by a thief, becoming unconscious at the moment), the drug leaves Darryl's system, and now all five of his senses operate normally.

During the interview, it comes down to Darryl and Scott. Scott is asked the same question he was asked last night; he answers it correctly, but when asked the reason, he does not know. Darryl steps in, gives the correct reason, and scores the position of junior analyst at Smythe-Bates. But in his speech, he confesses that he cheated by taking an experimental drug. A meeting is called to decide his fate, and Mr. Tyson tells him that he himself started out in the mail room, and Darryl should too. If he serves one year of duty in the mail room, he will score the position of junior analyst. Scott is cut off by his father. The story skips a year, and Darryl is shown asking his mom to move into a deluxe apartment. The movie ends with Darryl entering the Smythe-Bates building on his first day, accompanied by a familiar-looking doorman (a cameo by Sherman Hemsley of The Jeffersons).

== Cast ==
- Marlon Wayans as Darryl Witherspoon
- David Spade as Scott Thorpe
- Matthew Lillard as Tim LaFlour
- Brad Dourif as Dr. Thomas Wheedon
- Tamara Taylor as Janice Tyson
- Rip Torn as Randall Tyson
- Richard McGonagle as Robert Bellwether
- Esther Scott as Denise Witherspoon
- Ken Lerner as Dean Barlow
- Kenya Moore as Lorraine
- Ernie Lively as Coach Brandau
- Debra Jo Rupp as Fertility clinic attendant
- Vicellous Shannon as Carter
- Michael Weatherred as Kern
- Patrick Ewing as Himself
- Greg Grunberg as Steve the commentator
- Mark Christopher Lawrence as Wig shop owner
- Sherman Hemsley as Smythe-Bates Doorman
- John Ingle as Economics professor
- Jeanette Goldstein as Nurse Alvarez
- Cee Cee Michaela as Tonya
- Orlando Brown as Steve Witherspoon
- Jeff Garlin as Arlo Vickers
- Darrel Heath as Shady guy

== Production ==
Senseless was financed by Dimension Films/Miramax, and was the second movie idea Princeton University comedy writers Craig Mazin and Greg Erb had successfully pitched, with their first being the 1997 comedy RocketMan. That film was produced by The Walt Disney Company, which since 1993 had owned Dimension/Miramax. Filming for Senseless began on May 7, 1997 in Los Angeles.

== Reception ==
=== Box office ===
Senseless opened on February 20, 1998 and, in its opening weekend, made $5,337,651 at #5 behind Titanic's tenth weekend, The Wedding Singer's second, Sphere's second, and Good Will Hunting's twelfth.

=== Critical response ===
The film received negative reviews. Rotten Tomatoes gave the film an approval rating of 6% based on reviews from 17 critics. On Metacritic the film has a score of 36% based on reviews from 13 critics, indicating "generally unfavorable reviews". Audiences polled by CinemaScore gave the film an average grade of "B+" on an A+ to F scale.

Roger Ebert gave the film 2.5 out of 4. Todd McCarthy of Variety gave the film a negative review, writing the film took "dozens and dozens of shots on goal from every conceivable angle, but only racks up a handful of comic points", criticizing Wayans and Spade's performances. Janet Maslin was less negative, writing that director Penelope Spheeris "does inject a whiff of social conscience into an otherwise flimsy farce."

== Home media ==
The film was released on VHS by Dimension Home Video on August 11, 1998, with a DVD following on December 7, 1999. Echo Bridge Home Entertainment released Senseless on Blu-ray on January 27, 2013. Echo Bridge also included it on a four film DVD set with three other black-focused Miramax comedies (1996's Don't Be a Menace to South Central While Drinking Your Juice in the Hood, 1998's Ride and 2005's Underclassman). This package was titled "Miramax House Party Collection", and was released on August 7, 2012. Lionsgate Home Entertainment reissued the four film set on October 7, 2014.

Paramount Home Entertainment reissued Senseless on DVD on July 23, 2024. It was also made available on Paramount's free streaming service Pluto TV.

== Soundtrack ==
The Senseless soundtrack was released February 10, 1998 by Gee Street Records.

1. "Busy Child" - The Crystal Method
2. "Song for Lindy" - Fatboy Slim
3. "Absurd" - Fluke
4. "Together" - Moby
5. "Do You Want to Freak?" - The Freak Brothers
6. "Unexplained" - Gravediggaz
7. "Graciosa" - Moby
8. "Reeferendrum" - Fluke
9. "Set Back" - Fluke
10. "Jungle Brother (True Blue)" - Jungle Brothers
11. "Spacefunk" - Headrillaz
12. "Perfect for You" - P.M. Dawn
13. "Atom Bomb" - Fluke
14. "Look Around My Window" - Ambersunshower
15. "Mucho Dinero" - Yankee B.
16. "Smash the State" - Naked Aggression
17. "Gotta Be...Movin' on Up" - Prince Be of P.M. Dawn featuring Ky-Mani and John Forté
