= Paper Doll (P.M. Dawn song) =

1991 single by P.M. Dawn

Single by P.M. Dawn

from the album Of the Heart, of the Soul and of the Cross: The Utopian Experience
- Released: October 7, 1991
- Length: 4:53
- Label: Gee Street; Island
- Songwriters: Attrell Cordes; Gil Scott-Heron
- Producer: P.M. Dawn

P.M. Dawn singles chronology
"Set Adrift on Memory Bliss" (1991)	"Paper Doll" (1991)	"Reality Used to Be a Friend of Mine" (1992)

Music video
- "Paper Doll" on YouTube

"Paper Doll" is a song by American hip hop group P.M. Dawn, released in October 1991 as the third single from their debut studio album, Of the Heart, of the Soul and of the Cross: The Utopian Experience (1991).

== Background and composition ==
In an interview with Bomb, Prince Be stated,

"Paper Doll" is basically a song of unity. I used paper dolls to demonstrate how I think we should be... like the little cutouts that are holding hands all the time.

The song samples elements of "Ashley's Roachclip" by The Soul Searchers and "Angola, Louisiana" by Gil Scott-Heron and Brian Jackson. It opens with the line, "Imagine yourself as a link on a chain, the chain is wrapped around someone's mind / If you break off, then things start to change. And then you realize that there's no time." Alex Remington of The Huffington Post cited this line as an example of Prince Be's lyrics being "denser semantically than syllabically". In the song, Prince Be also says, "Imagine yourself as a cloud in the sky", and asks the audience to consider "what it would be like as a paper doll", referring to his surroundings as the "quote unquote real world".

== Critical reception ==
Simon Reynolds from Melody Maker commented, "One of the lovelier tracks for the most pure-and-simply gorgeous album of the year, "Paper Doll" is brimming with swoony harmony vocals, like jazz-influenced nightingales. The lyrics are barmy, staying dangerously close to Fotherington-Thomas-goes-New-Age territory when the subject of "thinking clouds" is touched upon, and yet, and yet, PM Dawn are too funky (in a mellow, marshmallowy sort of way) to be preposterous. Rather, they belong to an honourable continuum of black pop mystics/space cadets, from Hendrix via Earth Wind & Fire to Prince and Massive Attack." Andrew Collins from NME named it Single of the Week. Scott Poulson-Bryant wrote in The New York Times of the song, "These sentiments might seem coy if Prince Be did not report them with such wry conviction. And if the words don't move you, the groove will." Writing for the Spin Alternative Record Guide, Jonathan Bernstein stated, "Although at their most inspiring on the mellow tip, 'Paper Doll' is another loose-fitting warm weather accessory".

"Paper Doll" was placed at number two on Classic Rock History's list of the "Top 10 P.M. Dawn Songs" and number four on The Boombox's list of the five best songs from Of the Heart, of the Soul and of the Cross: The Utopian Experience.

== Charts ==
Chart (1991–1992)	Peak position
Australia (ARIA)	61
Belgium (Ultratop 50 Flanders)	43
Canada Top Singles (RPM)	31
France (SNEP)	45
Germany (GfK)	42
Netherlands (Single Top 100)	60
Switzerland (Schweizer Hitparade)	33
UK Singles (Official Charts)	49
UK Airplay (Music Week)	20
UK Dance (Music Week)	26
UK Club Chart (Record Mirror)	19
US Billboard Hot 100	28
