= Jon Baker (producer) =

British mental health executive

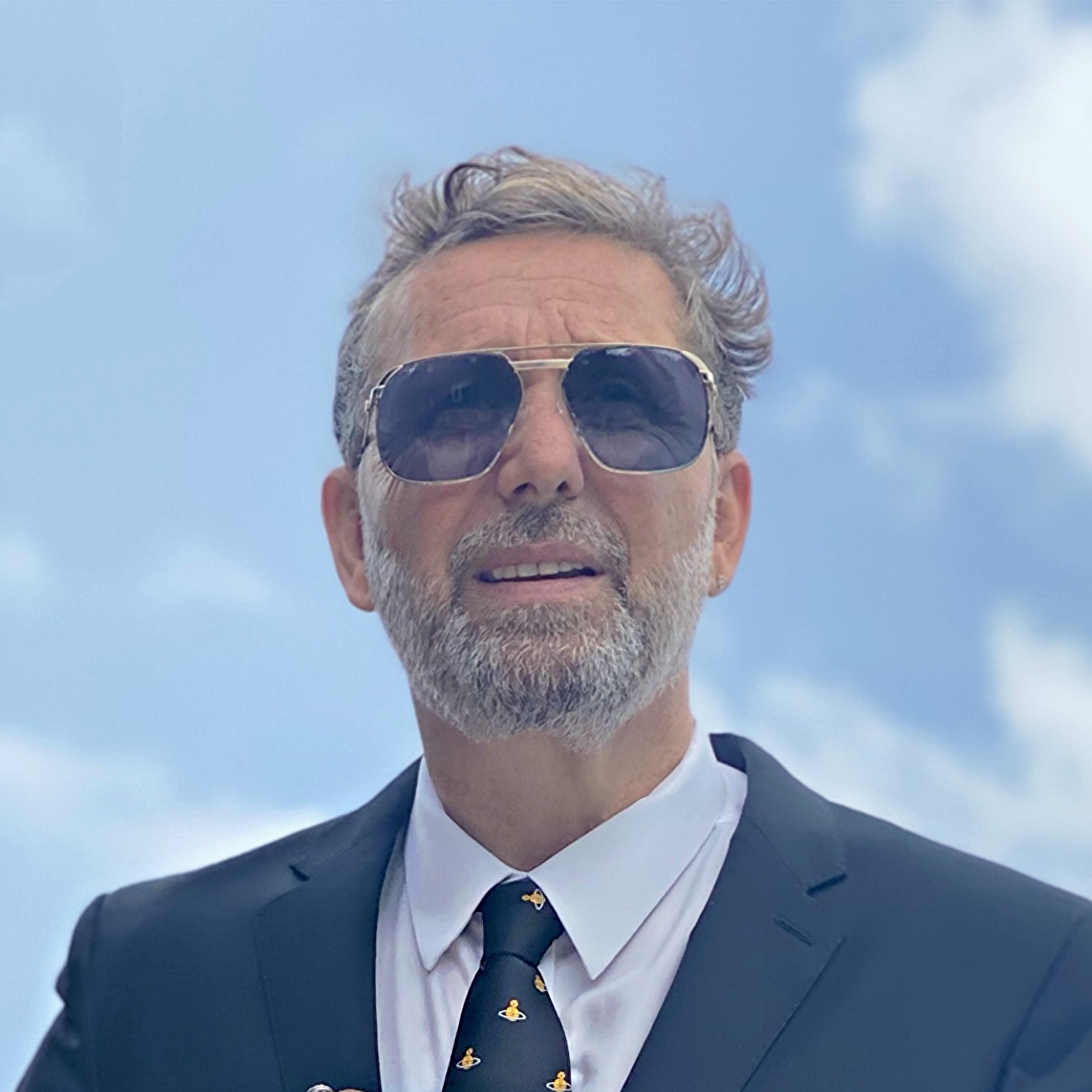
- Born: 1960 (age 65–66); London
- Citizenship: British / Jamaica
- Education: Chelsea College of Arts
- Occupations: music industry executive, hotelier, businessperson.

Jon Baker (born 1960) is a music industry executive. He has worked as a fashion designer, promoter, and is currently co-owner of Geejam, a luxury resort and recording studio located in San San, near Port Antonio, Jamaica.

== Early life ==
Baker was born in 1960 in London. His mother, Maureen Baker, was a fashion designer and his father, Roy Baker, sold classic cars. Baker attended the Chelsea College of Art.

== Early career ==
After leaving school in 1977, Baker opened a punk T-shirt store called Blooze in Kensington Market in 1978. In 1979, Blooze was relocated to the Great Gear Market, Kings Road, London and renamed Axiom. In 1980 Baker moved to New York and in 1981 staged a combined Axiom fashion show and concert in support of Spandau Ballet's performance at The Underground, Broadway's disco club.

In 1982, Baker launched UK fashion label Demob in New York. Baker then based himself in New York where he met club promoter and manager Ruza Blue who introduced him to the hip-hop scene in the Bronx. Baker then began working at The Roxy club.

Baker produced fashion shows for various designers and events in New York, such as the Danceteria and the Peppermint Lounge. In 1983, Baker designed and promoted a club on Union Square called Fresh 14, and in 1984 Baker returned to the UK.

== Gee Street Records ==
In 1985, having returned to the UK, Baker organized Doug E. Fresh and Slick Rick's first UK tour. That year, he met Rob Birch and Nick Hallam of the Stereo MCs and together they began to produce and distribute white label records to London dance shops. He also met his future wife Ziggi Golding, an agent who ran the progressive "Z" modeling agency. Baker alongside Britain's pirate radio Kiss FM hip-hop jock DJ Richie Rich in 1986 and the Stereo MCs, opened a recording studio called Gee Street Records. Among the artists Gee Street signed and/or promoted were Jon King/King Butcher, Funtopia, Gail Ann Dorsey, Queen Latifah, Jungle Brothers, the Stereo MCs, and P.M. Dawn. Gee Street's first significant success was the release of Straight out the Jungle by Jungle Brothers; Then, in 1988, he signed the Stereo MCs to a licensing deal with Island Records.

=== Polygram / Island Records ===
In 1990, Polygram Records’ Chris Blackwell signed P.M. Dawn, and proposed a joint venture with Island/PolyGram that secured Gee Street's roster for Island. Baker agreed on a worldwide joint venture with the focus on North American markets in 1991. Baker was appointed President of Island Jamaica for North America (the Jamaican music division of Island Records). The first release under the joint venture, PM Dawn's “Set Adrift on Memory Bliss” released in 1991, providing the funding for Bakers investments in Jamaica and with this he brought property in San San, Port Antonio.

The joint venture agreement between Island Polygram Records and Baker faltered and came to an end in 1996.

=== V2 ===
Later that year, Baker established a joint venture with Richard Branson and V2 Records, signing RZA to an exclusive solo recording deal in 1997.

V2 bought 80% of Gee Street and marketed it through BMG. Baker sold his remaining 20% share of Gee Street to Richard Branson in 2000.

== Geejam, 2000s ==
In 2002, he moved to Jamaica, became a Jamaican citizen. That year, he also produced the album Adelante, featuring Ky-Mani Marley and Alberto D'Ascola (aka Alborosie)

In 2004, Baker produced Two Culture Clash in collaboration with producer Mark Jones in the UK. In 2004 and again in 2005, he became a consultant for New Reality TV's Digicel Rising Stars talent competition on Jamaica's TVJ television station.

In 2006, Baker worked with Steve Beaver of the Hong Kong-based Beaver Music on the Singerz Collection album series through Universal Music Japan; it featured contemporary songs interpreted in a reggae style. Later that year, however, Baker and Beaver went into a more formal partnership and agreed to develop Geejam into a luxury private hotel.. The studio's resources are utilised by artists including Gorillaz, No Doubt, India Arie, Dru Hill, Gondwana, Les Nubians, Wyclef Jean, and Björk.

Geejam opened to the general public in 2008. Over this time, Drake, Santigold, Major Lazer, and Amy Winehouse have all worked on recording projects there.. Their album Great Expectation was released in the UK on 13 September 2010, and was received well by critics in Europe.
