= P.M. Dawn =

American hip-hop group

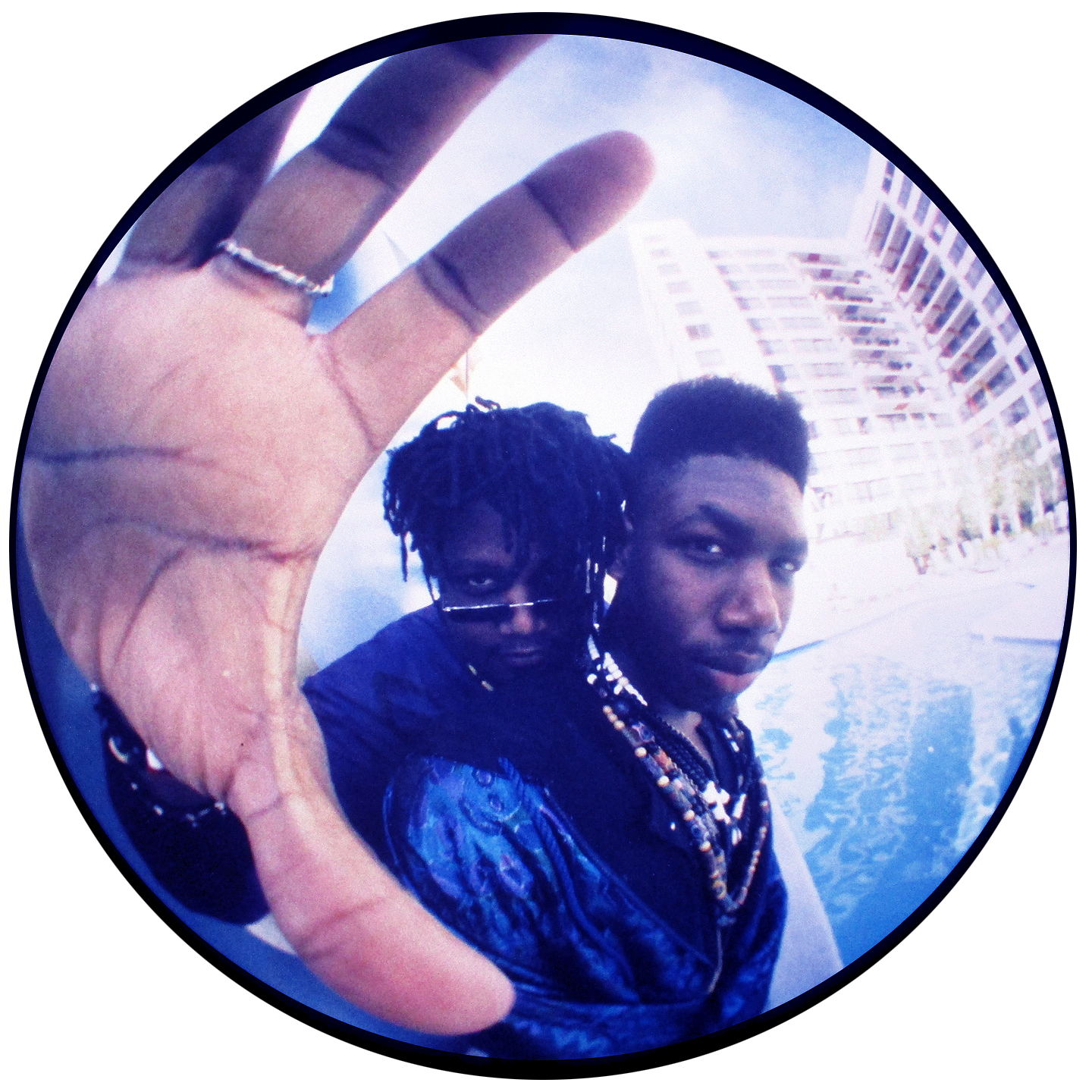
- P.M. Dawn (Attrell Cordes and Jarrett Cordes) in Los Angeles in 1991.

Background information
- Origin: Jersey City, New Jersey, U.S.
- Genres: Hip-hop; R&B; Alternative hip-hop
- Years active: 1988–present
- Labels: Gee Street; V2; Island
- Members: Doc. G; K-R.O.K.
- Past members: Prince Be; DJ Minutemix

P.M. Dawn is an American alternative hip-hop and R&B act from Jersey City, New Jersey formed in 1988. The group was founded as a duo by brothers Attrell Cordes (stage name Prince Be, sometimes credited as Prince Be the Nocturnal) and Jarrett Cordes (Eternal or DJ Minutemix). The group was noted for an eclectic and non-traditional take on hip-hop, and had significant crossover success in the early 1990s by merging hip-hop, older soul, and more pop-oriented urban R&B.

P.M. Dawn recorded its debut single, "Ode to a Forgetful Mind", in 1988. Its first album, Of the Heart, of the Soul and of the Cross: The Utopian Experience, was released in 1991 to critical acclaim, and was an immediate commercial success, driven by its single "Set Adrift on Memory Bliss". The 1993 follow-up, The Bliss Album...? (Vibrations of Love and Anger and the Ponderance of Life and Existence), featuring the hit singles "I'd Die Without You" and "Looking Through Patient Eyes", was also praised by critics. P.M. Dawn also received strong reviews for its next albums, Jesus Wept (1995) and Dearest Christian, I'm So Very Sorry for Bringing You Here. Love, Dad (1998), despite their poor sales.

In 2005, Prince Be's health issues due to complications of diabetes led his cousin Doc. G to take ownership of P.M. Dawn and Eternal's departure from the group. In 2016, Prince Be died from kidney disease. Doc G. continues to perform as P.M. Dawn, without the Cordes brothers' involvement.

== Early history ==
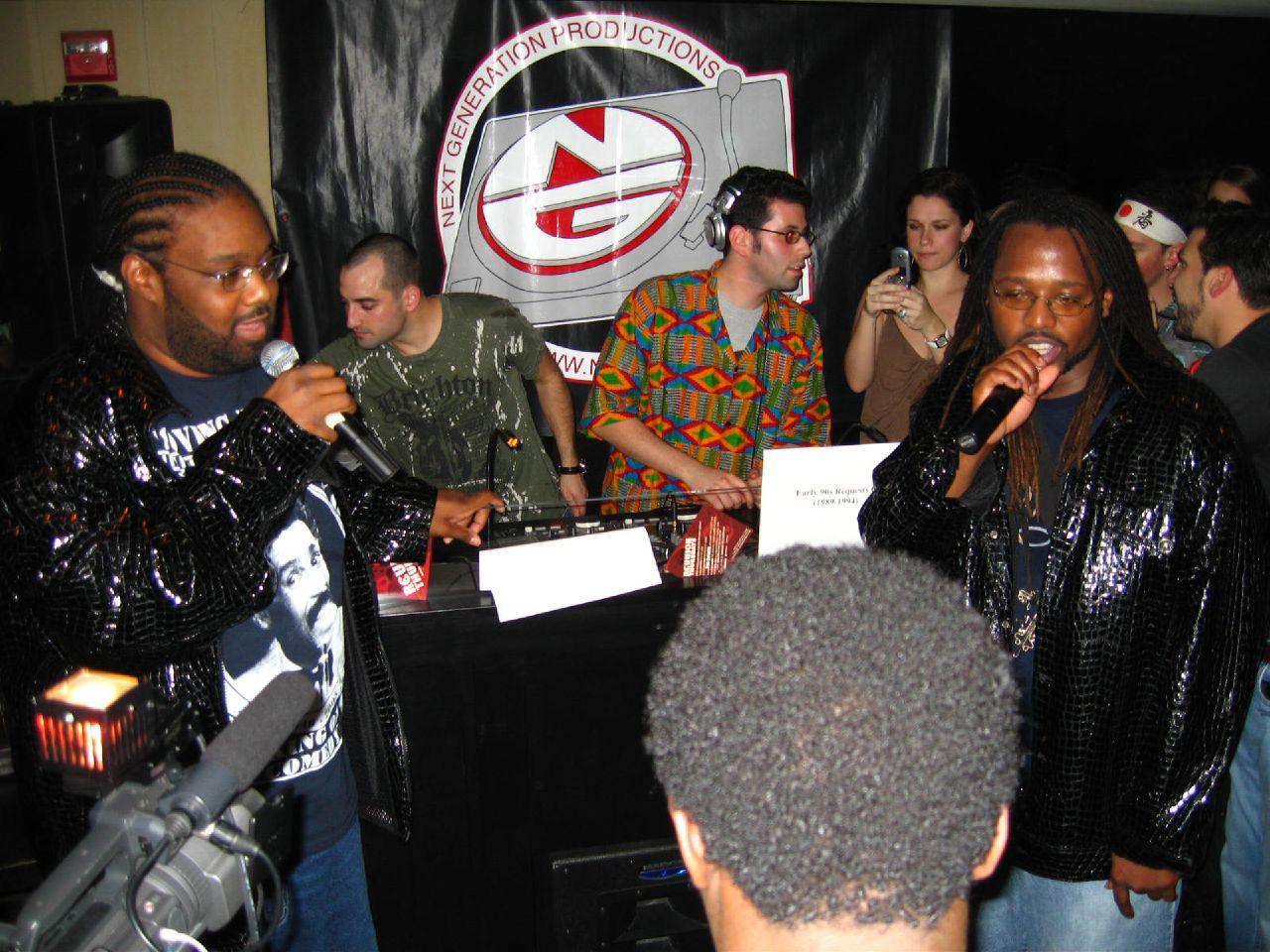
P.M. Dawn performing in 2006

Attrell Cordes began DJing parties and composing songs in ninth grade. Cordes, known by his stage name Prince Be, and his younger brother, Jarrett Cordes, known as DJ Minutemix, formed P.M. Dawn in 1988. The group's first demo tape was created using $600 that Prince Be had earned through his job as a night security guard at a homeless shelter.

They first approached Tommy Boy Records, the rap music subsidiary of Warner Brothers, with their demo, but they were told that they were too much like alternative hip-hoppers De La Soul, and not hardcore or ghetto, and were turned away. Eventually, Warlock, an independent record label, issued a debut single, "Ode to a Forgetful Mind", in 1989, but it went unnoticed.

The record label that released the single in the United Kingdom, Gee Street Records, found greater success. Gee Street mixed and marketed the song so that it attracted attention from music reviewers. P.M. Dawn generated interest not just from Gee Street's executive, Jon Baker, but also from several major UK record labels. Gee Street brought the brothers to London in 1990 to record tracks for an album; however, the label found itself facing bankruptcy during the recording. The entire Gee Street operation, along with P.M. Dawn's recording contract, was sold to the highest bidder, Island Records. Island issued a few more singles in the United Kingdom before releasing their debut album, Of the Heart, of the Soul and of the Cross: The Utopian Experience.

== Career ==
=== "Set Adrift on Memory Bliss" ===
Of the Heart, of the Soul and of the Cross featured the international hit "Set Adrift on Memory Bliss", which sampled the Spandau Ballet song "True", and featured a cameo by Spandau Ballet singer Tony Hadley in the music video. "Set Adrift on Memory Bliss" hit No. 1 the week of November 30, 1991, and was the first No. 1 song on the Billboard Hot 100 chart following the introduction of Nielsen SoundScan to the chart. The song also reached No. 3 in the United Kingdom. "Paper Doll", one of the early singles Island released in the United Kingdom, was released in the US as a follow-up to "Set Adrift on Memory Bliss", and peaked at No. 28 in early 1992.

With the success of its debut album, the group parted company with its manager, Nick Hemmings, and embarked on a world tour. During the tour, Prince Be gave an interview to Details magazine in which he expressed skepticism of rapper KRS-One's activism: "KRS-One wants to be a teacher, but a teacher of what?" KRS-One and his crew, Boogie Down Productions, responded by storming a P.M. Dawn concert, forcing the group off the stage and performing their songs "I'm Still #1" and "The Bridge Is Over". Defending his actions to USA Today's James T. Jones IV, KRS-One said: "I answered his question. 'A teacher of what?' I'm a teacher of respect."

In 1992, P.M. Dawn appeared on the Red Hot Organization's compilation CD Red Hot + Dance, contributing the Richie Rich Mix of "Set Adrift on Memory Bliss". The album, featuring George Michael and Madonna, among others, was meant to raise money and awareness of the AIDS epidemic. On February 12, 1992, P.M. Dawn was nominated for the BRIT Awards and won Best International Newcomer.

=== The Bliss Album...? ===
Before releasing The Bliss Album...? (Vibrations of Love and Anger and the Ponderance of Life and Existence), P.M. Dawn contributed the single "I'd Die Without You" to the 1992 Eddie Murphy comedy Boomerang and its soundtrack. This No. 3 pop hit was included on The Bliss Album...?, as was the Billboard No. 6 pop hit "Looking Through Patient Eyes".

"Looking Through Patient Eyes" featured backing vocals by Cathy Dennis and sampled George Michael's hit "Father Figure". The video for the song was shot in a church and featured Christian images throughout; most notably, Prince Be wore a T-shirt with "Thank you, Jesus" written on it in black lettering.

The Bliss Album...? featured a duet with Boy George, "More Than Likely", and a cover of The Beatles' "Norwegian Wood (This Bird Has Flown)". The album also included "So On and So On", which led to the 1999 sampling lawsuit Batiste v. Island Records, Inc., in which Paul and Michael Batiste claimed that "So On and So On" used unauthorized samples from David Batiste & The Gladiators' "Funky Soul". The Fifth Circuit Federal Appellate Court found that the Batistes gave no evidence that consumers were confused or deceived by either the use of a digital sample of "Funky Soul" in "So On and So On" or the identification of David Batiste as a co-author of the track. The Batistes' claim that Paul and Michael Batiste were improperly excluded from the album's liner notes also failed to suggest that consumers were confused, especially because the liner notes credit the band in which Paul and Michael Batiste performed. Though Island Records won the lawsuit, the song was removed from subsequent releases of The Bliss Album and is no longer available for purchase in its publishing catalog.

=== Jesus Wept and DJ Minutemix's arrest ===
P.M. Dawn contributed a cover of "You Got Me Floatin'" to the 1993 compilation album Stone Free: A Tribute to Jimi Hendrix. Artists from Pat Metheny to Eric Clapton to Ice-T's Body Count were included. They also remixed Beautiful People's "If 60's Was 90's".

Their 1995 album Jesus Wept was unable to attain the success of their first two albums. The album's highest charting single was "Downtown Venus", which contained a sample of Deep Purple's "Hush", and reached No. 48 on the Billboard chart. Also, in 1995, P.M. Dawn was credited with the remix of White Zombie's "Blood, Milk and Sky" (Miss September Mix) on the Supersexy Swingin' Sounds compilation album. In the same year, Jarret Cordes (DJ Minutemix) was accused of sexually abusing a 14-year old relative and was subsequently arrested in Burlington County. The charges were dropped due to lack of evidence.

In 1996, P.M. Dawn contributed "Non-Fiction Burning" to the AIDS benefit album Red Hot + Rio produced by the Red Hot Organization. In 1998, Prince Be contributed the tracks "Perfect for You" and "Gotta Be...Movin' on Up" to the Marlon Wayans and David Spade comedy Senseless, followed later in the year by P.M. Dawn's fourth album, Dearest Christian, I'm So Very Sorry for Bringing You Here. Love, Dad. It was less successful again, with the album's single, "Being So Not for You (I Had No Right)" being a minor chart hit.

In 2000, they released the compilation, The Best of P.M. Dawn. Through their website, they also began selling a mail-order-only album called Fucked Music on December 1, 2000. This was paired with a bonus CD, Unreleased Vol. 1, and a T-shirt.

=== Prince Be's declining health ===
Prince Be suffered a massive stroke in early 2005 that left him paralyzed on the left side of his body. Undeterred, P.M. Dawn appeared on NBC's Hit Me, Baby, One More Time show, performing "Set Adrift on Memory Bliss", and covered Puddle of Mudd's "Blurry". Despite Prince Be still suffering symptoms, they beat Animotion, Missing Persons, Juice Newton and Shannon to claim the $20,000 charitable prize, which they contributed to the Juvenile Diabetes Research Foundation, as Prince Be was a diabetic.

Following their appearance on Hit Me, Baby, One More Time, Minutemix left the group due to internal differences. This led to the introduction of the Cordes brothers' paternal first cousin, Gregory Lewis Carr II, known by his stage name Doc. G (also known as 'Dr. Giggles'). Amid trademark and artistic criticism, Doc. G continues to perform as P.M. Dawn.

On June 17, 2016, Prince Be died from kidney disease, caused by complications of diabetes, at the age of 46 at a hospital in Neptune City, New Jersey. On April 6, 2018, Doc. G hired music producer K-R.O.K. as the new member of P.M. Dawn.

== Legacy ==
On April 3, 2022, one of the Unsung documentary episodes, highlighting the story of P.M. Dawn, premiered on TV One.

== Discography ==
=== Studio albums ===
Title	Album details	Peak chart positions									Certifications (sales thresholds)
Title	Album details	US	US R&B	AUS	CAN	NLD	NZ	SWE	SWI	UK	Certifications (sales thresholds)
Of the Heart, of the Soul and of the Cross: The Utopian Experience	Released: August 6, 1991; Label: Gee Street; Formats: CD, cassette, LP	48	29	89	41	82	45	44	38	8	RIAA: Gold; BPI: Gold; MC: Gold
The Bliss Album…?	Released: March 23, 1993; Label: Gee Street; Formats: CD, cassette	30	23	38	32	—	—	—	—	9	RIAA: Gold; BPI: Silver; MC: Gold
Jesus Wept	Released: October 3, 1995; Label: Gee Street; Formats: CD, cassette, LP	119	—	108	—	—	—	—	—	97	
Dearest Christian, I'm So Very Sorry for Bringing You Here. Love, Dad	Released: October 27, 1998; Label: Gee Street/V2; Formats: CD, cassette	—	—	117	—	—	—	—	—	—	
Fucked Music	Released: December 1, 2000; Label: Positive Plain Music; Formats: CD	—	—	—	—	—	—	—	—	—	
"—" denotes releases that did not chart or were not released.

=== Compilation albums ===
- 2000: The Best of P.M. Dawn (V2)
- 2000: Unreleased Vol. 1 (Positive Plain Music)
- 2008: Most Requested (Sheridan Square Records)
- 2010: P.M. Dawn: Greatest Hits Live! (Sbcmg)

=== Singles ===
Title	Year	Peak chart positions										Certifications	Album
Title	Year	US	AUS	BEL (FL)	CAN	FRA	GER	NLD	NZ	SWI	UK	Certifications	Album
"Ode to a Forgetful Mind"	1989	—	—	—	—	—	—	—	—	—	—		Non-album single
"A Watcher's Point of View (Don't 'Cha Think)"	1991	—	—	—	—	—	—	—	—	—	36		Of the Heart, of the Soul and of the Cross: The Utopian Experience
"Set Adrift on Memory Bliss"	1991	1	7	14	9	17	3	4	1	4	3	RIAA: Gold; ARIA: Gold	Of the Heart, of the Soul and of the Cross: The Utopian Experience
"Paper Doll"	1991	28	61	43	31	45	42	60	—	33	49		Of the Heart, of the Soul and of the Cross: The Utopian Experience
"Reality Used to Be a Friend of Mine"	1992	—	118	—	—	—	—	—	—	—	29		Of the Heart, of the Soul and of the Cross: The Utopian Experience
"I'd Die Without You"	1992	3	42	—	10	—	85	53	38	—	30	RIAA: Gold	Boomerang: Original Soundtrack Album and The Bliss Album...?
"Looking Through Patient Eyes"	1993	6	20	—	1	—	63	—	11	—	11		The Bliss Album...?
"More Than Likely" (featuring Boy George)	1993	—	—	—	—	—	—	—	—	—	40		The Bliss Album...?
"The Ways of the Wind"	1993	54	—	—	24	—	—	—	—	—	—		The Bliss Album...?
"Plastic"	1993	—	—	—	—	—	—	—	—	—	—		The Bliss Album...?
"Norwegian Wood"	1993	—	133	—	—	—	—	—	—	—	—		The Bliss Album...?
"You Got Me Floatin'"	1993	115	43	—	—	—	—	—	—	—	—		Stone Free: A Tribute to Jimi Hendrix
"Downtown Venus"	1995	48	73	—	—	—	—	—	—	—	58		Jesus Wept
"Sometimes I Miss You So Much (Dedicated to the Christ-Consciousness)"	1995	95	139	—	—	—	—	—	—	—	58		Jesus Wept
"Gotta Be...Movin' on Up" (featuring Ky-Mani)	1998	90	13	12	—	18	74	—	23	—	68	ARIA: Gold	Senseless soundtrack
"I Had No Right"	1998	44	118	—	—	—	—	—	—	—	97		Dearest Christian, I'm So Very Sorry for Bringing You Here. Love, Dad
"Faith in You"	1998	—	—	—	—	—	—	—	—	—	—		Dearest Christian, I'm So Very Sorry for Bringing You Here. Love, Dad
"Night in the City"	2000	—	—	—	—	—	—	—	—	—	—		A Case of Joni
"Amnesia"	2002	—	—	—	—	—	—	—	—	—	—		Non-album single
"—" denotes releases that did not chart or were not released.
