= Sabrina Johnston =

American singer

- Born: Sabrina Gillison
- Genres: Dance, hip hop
- Occupation(s): Singer, songwriter
- Years active: 1991–present

Sabrina Johnston is an American singer, best known for her 1991 club anthem, "Peace", which reached the Top 10 in the UK Singles Chart.

== Career ==
Johnston grew up in the United States attending summer music camps, dance and voice classes before enrolling at Cheyney State University as a music major. Johnston released her debut single "Peace" in May 1991 on the small New York label JBR Records, and a debut US album titled Peace in the Valley was scheduled for release on the label. Johnston eventually released her debut album, Peace, in 1992, which features her hit single of the same name. Further singles released from the album were "Friendship" and "I Wanna Sing". In the same year, Johnston appeared on the Red Hot Organization's dance compilation album, Red Hot + Dance, contributing an original track, "Peace (Nu-Mix)", to raise awareness and money in support of the AIDS epidemic.

A second album, Sabrina, was released in Japan only in 1996, and re-titled Yum Yum for its US release in 1998. Johnston made an appearance as a backing vocalist on Lauryn Hill's "To Zion", from the 1998 album, The Miseducation of Lauryn Hill.

== Discography ==
=== Albums ===
List of albums, with selected chart positions
| Title | Album details | Peak chart positions |
| Title | Album details | AUS |
|---|---|---|
| Peace | Released: 1992 | 143 |
| Yum Yum | Released: 1998 | — |

=== Singles ===
| Year | Single | Peak chart positions | | | | | | Album |
| Year | Single | US Dance | AUS | IRE | NOR | SWE | UK | Album |
|---|---|---|---|---|---|---|---|---|
| 1991 | "Peace" | — | 24 | 14 | — | 23 | 8 | Peace |
| 1991 | "Friendship" | 30 | 64 | — | 9 | — | 58 | Peace |
| 1992 | "I Wanna Sing" | — | 115 | — | — | — | 46 | Peace |
| 1992 | "Gypsy Woman / Peace Remixes" (split single with Crystal Waters) | — | — | — | — | — | 35 | Red Hot + Dance (by Various Artists) |
| 1993 | "You Got Me (Love So Sweet)" (US only) | — | — | — | — | — | — | singles only |
| 1994 | "Satisfy My Love" | — | — | — | — | — | 62 | singles only |
| 1995 | "Free, Gay & Happy" (with Coming Out Crew) | — | 152 | — | — | — | 50 | singles only |
| 1998 | "Reasons" (US only) | 31 | — | — | — | — | — | Yum Yum |
| 2001 | "Lift You Up" (ITA only) | — | — | — | — | — | — | single only |
"—" denotes releases that did not chart or were not released.
