= Peace (Sabrina Johnston song) =

1991 single by Sabrina Johnston

Single by Sabrina Johnston

from the album Peace
- Released: August 26, 1991
- Genre: Disco; gospel; house
- Length: 4:02
- Label: ATCO
- Songwriters: Ken Johnston; Sabrina Johnston
- Producers: Ken Johnston; Sabrina Johnston

Sabrina Johnston singles chronology
"Peace" (1991)	"Friendship" (1991)

Music video
- "Peace" on YouTube

"Peace" (also known as "Peace (In the Valley)") is a song by American singer Sabrina Johnston, released in the United States through ATCO Records in August 1991. It was released as the first single from her debut studio album, Peace (1992). The single reached number eight on the UK Singles Chart and entered the top 30 in Australia, Ireland, Italy and Sweden. It was written and produced by Johnston with help from her husband Ken Johnston. She told in a 1991 interview, that she wrote the song during the Gulf War. "I wanted to create something positive", she said. In 1992, Johnston appeared on the Red Hot Organization's dance compilation album, Red Hot + Dance, contributing a new remix of "Peace", the Nu-Mix, to raise awareness and money in support of the AIDS epidemic. Richard Heslop directed its accompanying music video.

The song caught the attention of English rock band the Rolling Stones, who asked her to audition for their tour. However, they lost out to JBR Records and EastWest when she was signed for her second album. New remixes of the track were released in 2009.

== Composition ==
"Peace" is composed in the key of A Major at a tempo of 121 beats per minute.

== Critical reception ==
Larry Flick from Billboard magazine wrote, "Not since Crystal Waters set clubland on fire a couple months ago with 'Gypsy Woman' have we heard anything as exciting as 'Peace' by Sabrina Johnston", adding that the singer "delivers uplifting lyrics with the power and style of a young Aretha Franklin. She is supported by a feast of lush string-like synths, a rousing bass line, and mixable percussion breaks." In 1992, Flick named it "one of 1991's brightest moments." British Crawley News described it as "singalong hallelujah stuff". Dave Sholin from the Gavin Report remarked that a "gospel influence pours out of this sizzlin' production by a new vocal talent from the East Coast whose previous experience has been as a studio singer. Talk about an eye opener—this is one made to infuse excitement onto the airwaves."

In 1994, Peter Paphides and Simon Price from Melody Maker wrote that merging of Italo and garage had resulted in "a million fantastic, brutally poppy house tracks with loads of sampled screaming divas", like "Peace". A reviewer from Music & Media noted that originally released by the US-based JBR label, this European remix by British electronic music group Brothers In Rhythm (Steve Anderson/David Seaman) "lifts the garage groove to powerful and energetic heights." James Hamilton from Music Week called it a "gospel-ish repetitive garage lurcher". Andy Beevers from the Record Mirror Dance Update felt the song "could become a disco classic", constating that the producers "have given it a piano, strings and organ-driven sound that is every bit as wild, energetic, glorious and uplifting as the vocals."

== Chart performance ==
"Peace" entered the top 10 in the United Kingdom, peaking at number eight on September 22, 1991, during its fourth week on the UK Singles Chart. It held that position for two weeks, before dropping to number 10 and then leaving the UK top 10. On the UK year-end chart, the song ended up at number 61. On the Music Week Dance Singles chart and the Record Mirror Club Chart, "Peace" reached number five and number one, respectively. In Luxembourg, it was also a top-10 hit, peaking at number eight. It became a top-20 hit in Ireland and Italy , as well as on the Eurochart Hot 100, on which it peaked at number 15 in October 1991. On the European Dance Radio Chart, the song peaked at number four in November same year. Outside Europe, it charted in Australia, peaking at number 24 in March 1992. "Peace" stayed within the ARIA Top 50 singles chart for a total of eight weeks. In West Asia, the song became a top-20 hit in Israel, peaking at number 20 on 8 October 1991.

== Music video ==
The music video for "Peace" was directed by British director Richard Heslop. It features Johnston performing in front of a bluescreen backdrop of diverse documentary footage, such as urban landscapes, blooming trees, children playing in a park, boats at a harbour, or people dancing in the street. Sometimes a baby, a dog or a female dancer appear instead of Johnston. The video ends with a couple kissing each other.

== Legacy ==
American musician Moby named "Peace" one of his classic cuts in 1994, saying, "I first heard this when I was touring England for the first time. I was in someone's car and the tape kept on repeating and I heard it over and over again. I thought it was wonderful and I ran out and bought it."

== Track listings ==
- 7-inch single, Germany (1991)
1. "Peace" (Brothers In Rhythm Edit) – 4:02
2. "Peace" (In The Valley Mix) – 3:52
- CD single, Europe (1991)
1. "Peace" (Brothers In Rhythm Mix) – 6:52
2. "Peace" (Original Stomp Mix) – 7:12
3. "Peace" (Dub Mix) – 5:04
- CD maxi, Europe (1991)
1. "Peace" (Brothers In Rhythm Edit)
2. "Peace" (Brothers In Rhythm)
3. "Peace" (Original Stomp Mix)
- CD (remixes), Italy (2009)
1. "Peace" (Midnight Express Classic Gold Mix) – 10:13
2. "Peace" (Denzal Park Mix) – 6:25
3. "Peace" (Midnight Express Power Mix) – 8:06
4. "Peace" (Midnight Express New Retro Mix) – 7:33
5. "Peace" (Jerome Farley Floor One 2009 Club Remix) – 7:31
6. "Peace" (Jerome Farley Floor One 2009 Dub) – 5:23
7. "Peace" (Midnight Express Rock Da House Mix) – 7:36
8. "Peace" (Luca Belladonna Remix) – 6:53
9. "Peace" (Original Edit Version) – 4:05
10. "Peace" (Power Original Mix) – 8:06

== Charts ==
=== Weekly charts ===
Chart (1991–1992)	Peak position
Australia (ARIA)	24
Europe (Eurochart Hot 100)	15
Europe (European Dance Radio)	4
Europe (European Hit Radio)	14
Ireland (IRMA)	14
Israel (Israeli Singles Chart)	20
Italy (Musica e dischi)	19
Luxembourg (Radio Luxembourg)	8
Sweden (Sverigetopplistan)	23
UK Singles (Official Charts)	8
UK Airplay (Music Week)	7
UK Dance (Music Week)	5
UK Club Chart (Record Mirror)	1

=== Year-end charts ===
Chart (1991)	Position
UK Singles (OCC)	61
UK Club Chart (Record Mirror)	17
