= Of the Heart, of the Soul and of the Cross: The Utopian Experience =

Studio album by P.M. Dawn
- Released: August 6, 1991
- Recorded: December 1990 – April 1991
- Studio: Berwick Street Studios and Gee Street Studios in London
- Genre: Hip-hop; pop; R&B
- Length: 54:15
- Label: Gee Street; Island
- Producer: P.M. Dawn

P.M. Dawn chronology
Of the Heart, of the Soul and of the Cross: The Utopian Experience (1991)	The Bliss Album...? (1993)

Singles from Of the Heart, of the Soul and of the Cross: The Utopian Experience
- 1. "A Watcher's Point of View (Don't 'Cha Think)" Released: May 1991; 2. "Set Adrift on Memory Bliss" Released: August 1991; 3. "Paper Doll" Released: October 1991; 4. "Reality Used to Be a Friend of Mine" Released: February 1992

Of the Heart, of the Soul and of the Cross: The Utopian Experience is the debut album by American hip-hop group P.M. Dawn. It was recorded at Berwick Street Studios and Gee Street Studios in London. The album features soul vocals and stream-of-consciousness raps by Prince Be and unconventional samples by producer DJ Minutemix.

Of the Heart, of the Soul and of the Cross was released by Gee Street Records in September 1991 to rave reviews from music critics. It became an immediate commercial success with the help of its single "Set Adrift on Memory Bliss", which was also praised by critics. The album produced four hits and sold 850,000 copies by 1993. Of the Heart, of the Soul and of the Cross has sold one million copies.

== Background ==
In 1989, P.M. Dawn's debut single "Ode to a Forgetful Mind" was released by Warlock Records, but it went unnoticed. The label that released the single in the United Kingdom, Gee Street Records, found greater success. Gee Street mixed and marketed the song so that it earned considerable attention from music reviewers, and P.M. Dawn found themselves courted not just by Gee Street's head, John Baker, but also by most of the major record labels in the UK. Gee Street brought the group to London in 1990 to record tracks for an album, however, the label found itself facing bankruptcy during the recording. The entire Gee Street operation—along with P.M. Dawn's contract—was sold to the highest bidder, Island Records. Island issued a few more singles in the UK before releasing Of the Heart, of the Soul and of the Cross: The Utopian Experience as P.M. Dawn's debut album.

== Singles ==
Of the Heart, of the Soul and of the Cross featured the international hit "Set Adrift on Memory Bliss", which sampled the Spandau Ballet song "True", and featured a cameo by Spandau Ballet singer Tony Hadley in the music video of the song. "Set Adrift on Memory Bliss" hit No. 1 the week of November 30, 1991, and holds the distinction of being the first No. 1 song on the Billboard Hot 100 chart following the introduction of Nielsen SoundScan to the singles charts. The song also reached No. 3 in the United Kingdom. "Paper Doll", which was one of the early singles Island released in the UK to test the waters for the band, was released in the US as a follow-up to "Set Adrift on Memory Bliss", and peaked at No. 28 in early 1992. "Paper Doll" is said well over 100 times in the song, which makes it second only to M.C. Hammer's "Pray", which holds the record for the most times a title is repeated in an American top-40 hit (147).

"Reality Used to Be a Friend of Mine", for which a music video was also produced, is featured as the opening song in the 1992 film Encino Man but does not feature on the film's retail soundtrack.

== Critical reception ==
Professional ratings
Review scores
Source	Rating
AllMusic	5/5 stars
Chicago Tribune	3.5/4 stars
The Encyclopedia of Popular Music	4/5 stars
Entertainment Weekly	A
The Huffington Post	90/100
Los Angeles Times	3/4 stars
Q	4/5 stars
Select	4/5
Spin Alternative Record Guide	9/10
The Village Voice	A

Of the Heart, of the Soul and of the Cross received rave reviews from critics. In The Village Voice, Robert Christgau wrote that Prince Be's escapist raps were skilled, thoughtful, and eccentric, while the music's varied synthesis was the most intelligently conceived since Prince: "It's got total outreach—moving effortlessly from speech to song, the quiet storm of sweet hooks and soft beats surprises like prime Big Star or XTC, only it's never brittle or arch." Spin magazine's Jonathan Bernstein said P.M. Dawn had effortlessly consolidated artistic and commercial sounds with a combination of substantial rap, lushly appealing music, and impressive vocal arrangements on their debut record, which he wrote "comes out of nowhere and ends up on the front stoop soundtrack of the summer." James Bernard from Entertainment Weekly felt that Prince Be's melodic, innovative lyrics and DJ Minutemix's unconventional sounds sounded sincere without being sappy, while drawing on influences from Jimi Hendrix and Prince without having either artist's sexual laments. Greg Kot, writing in the Chicago Tribune, found the songs memorable, artful, and infused with the silly raps of De La Soul, the compelling dance grooves of Soul II Soul, and the atmospheric acid rock of Lenny Kravitz.

Of the Heart, of the Soul and of the Cross was voted the fifth best album of the year in The Village Voice's annual Pazz & Jop critics poll for 1991. Christgau, the poll's creator, ranked it third on his own list. It was named the tenth best album of 1991 by Spin, and by Robert Hilburn of the Los Angeles Times. In his year-end list for The New York Times, Jon Pareles ranked it the fourth best album of 1991 and wrote that P.M. Dawn have found a synthesis of pop, hip hop, and spirituality that has eluded artists such as Prince.

In a retrospective review, Q magazine called Of the Heart, of the Soul and of the Cross a beautiful, unconventional album that expanded the creative possibilities of hip hop and featured songs that "had little or nothing to do with the 'hood, but everything to do with Utopia". AllMusic's Steve Huey said that the album was a "startling reimagination" of hip hop's possibilities, even though it was not "embraced by the entire hip hop community." He felt that it still sounds radically innovative as proof that pop, R&B, and hip hop styles could be merged for creative rather than commercial purposes. In The Encyclopedia of Popular Music, Colin Larkin wrote that the album showed P.M. Dawn growing "out of the De La Soul comparisons that had previously plagued them" and becoming "one of the most concise, creative forces in rap/dance." Alex Remington of The Huffington Post said that it was "definitely a rap album, albeit one unlike anything released in the years to come ... Heard today, the album sounds like a time capsule from a more expansive era, and it stands the test of time." In 1999, Ned Raggett of Freaky Trigger ranked it at number 28 in a list of the best albums of the 1990s.

== Track listing ==
No.	Title	Writer(s)	Length
1.	"Intro"	Attrell S. Cordes; Chick Corea	0:57
2.	"Reality Used to Be a Friend of Mine"	Cordes	4:40
3.	"Paper Doll"	Cordes; Gil Scott-Heron	4:53
4.	"To Serenade a Rainbow"	Cordes; Hugh Masekela	3:48
5.	"Comatose"	Cordes; Sylvester Stewart	4:53
6.	"A Watcher's Point of View (Don't 'Cha Think)"	Cordes; Tom Johnston	4:13
7.	"Even After I Die"	Cordes; Dennis Coffey	3:57
8.	"In the Presence of Mirrors"	Cordes	4:02
9.	"Set Adrift on Memory Bliss"	Cordes; Gary Kemp	4:10
10.	"Shake"	Cordes; Todd Terry	3:18
11.	"If I Wuz U"	Cordes	4:43
12.	"On a Clear Day"	Cordes	5:22
13.	"The Beautiful"	Cordes	5:21
Total length:			54:15

Sample credits

- "Intro" contains a sample of "Imp's Welcome" performed by Chick Corea.
- "Paper Doll" contains a sample of "Angola, Louisiana" performed by Gil Scott-Heron & Brian Jackson. This was not noted in the album's liner notes at the time of the album's pressing.
- "To Serenade a Rainbow" contains a sample of "Child of the Earth" performed by Hugh Masekela and a sample of "Din Daa Daa" performed by George Kranz.
- "Comatose" contains a sample of "Thankful and Thoughtful" performed by Sly and the Family Stone and a sample of "I Walk on Guilded Splinters" performed by Dr. John.
- "A Watcher's Point of View (Don't 'Cha Think)" contains a sample of "Feelin' Down Farther" performed by the Doobie Brothers.
- "Even After I Die" contains a sample of "Garden of the Moon" performed by Dennis Coffey.
- "Set Adrift on Memory Bliss" contains a sample of "True" performed by Spandau Ballet.
- "If I Wuz U" contains a sample of "Pocket Calculator" performed by Kraftwerk.
- "The Beautiful" contains a sample of "Baby, You're a Rich Man" by the Beatles.

== Personnel ==
Credits are adapted from the album's liner notes.

- Cally – art direction
- Andy Earl – photography
- Scott Harding – engineering
- Frankie Laine – photography (assistant)
- P.M. Dawn – production
- John Sherwood – engineering
- Tyrell (The Computer Wiz) – engineering

== Charts ==
=== Weekly charts ===
Chart (1991–1992)	Peak position
Australian Albums (ARIA)	89
Canadian Albums (RPM)	41
Dutch Albums (Album Top 100)	82
New Zealand Albums (RMNZ)	45
Swedish Albums (Sverigetopplistan)	44
Swiss Albums (Schweizer Hitparade)	38
UK Albums (OCC)	8
US Billboard 200	48
US Top R&B/Hip-Hop Albums (Billboard)	29

=== Year-end charts ===
Chart (1992)	Position
US Top R&B/Hip-Hop Albums (Billboard)	98

== Certifications ==
Region	Certification	Certified units/sales
Canada (Music Canada)	Gold	50,000^{^}
United Kingdom (BPI)	Gold	100,000^{^}
United States (RIAA)	Gold	500,000^{^}
^{^} Shipments figures based on certification alone.
