= Set Adrift on Memory Bliss =

1991 single by P.M. Dawn

Single by P.M. Dawn

from the album Of the Heart, of the Soul and of the Cross: The Utopian Experience
- B-side: "A Watcher's Point of View (Don't 'Cha Think)"
- Released: August 5, 1991
- Genre: Hip hop; psychedelic pop; dance-rap
- Length: 4:10
- Label: Gee Street; Island
- Songwriters: Gary Kemp; Attrell Cordes
- Producer: P.M. Dawn

P.M. Dawn singles chronology
"A Watcher's Point of View (Don't 'Cha Think)" (1991)	"Set Adrift on Memory Bliss" (1991)	"Paper Doll" (1992)

"Set Adrift on Memory Bliss" is a song by American hip-hop group P.M. Dawn, released in August 1991 by Gee Street and Island Records as the second single from their debut album, Of the Heart, of the Soul and of the Cross: The Utopian Experience (1991). It is built around samples of Spandau Ballet's "True", the Soul Searchers' "Ashley's Roachclip", and the Bob James version of Paul Simon's "Take Me to the Mardi Gras", with the remainder of the song written by P.M. Dawn vocalist Attrell "Prince Be" Cordes. Only Prince Be and "True" writer Gary Kemp were credited for writing the track.

The song was P.M. Dawn's only number-one hit on the US Billboard Hot 100, and it was the first number-one song after the debut of the Nielsen SoundScan system, which monitored airplay and sales more closely than before, when Billboard had to rely on manual sales reports and airplay data. According to the test charts of the SoundScan system, "Set Adrift on Memory Bliss" was at number one for at least three weeks but officially has a one-week reign at number one. Worldwide, it reached number one in New Zealand, number three in the United Kingdom, and number seven in Australia. Its music video was directed by Mark Pellington. The song was ranked number 81 on VH1's "100 Greatest Songs of Hip Hop." Blender ranked it at number 94 in their list of "Greatest Songs Since You Were Born" in 2005.

== Composition ==
Attrell "Prince Be" Cordes told in a 1991 Melody Maker interview about the song's conception, "I have to like a song before I can deal with it, the music comes first. I've always liked that Spandau Ballet song, it's so dreamy and trance-like, so when I came to deal with it, I knew I'd be daydreaming along to that one. 'Set Adrift' was so obvious to do: have the Spandau Ballet loop in there and a few other things, and dress it up a bit. That was all that was necessary."

== Critical reception ==
In a retrospective review, Justin Chadwick from Albumism called the song "unforgettable" and "pure pop perfection". He added, "Regardless of where you ultimately netted out with respect to your overall opinion of P.M. Dawn, if you're like me, you were hooked the first time you heard the pop-infused brilliance of 'Set Adrift on Memory Bliss'." Steve Huey from AllMusic described it as a "shimmering" ballad. Another AllMusic editor, Hal Horowitz, named it an "amazingly mature debut tune." Upon the release, J.D. Considine from The Baltimore Sun felt that "they create entirely new grooves out of half-remembered song-bites, like the slice of Spandau Ballet's 'True' that crops up in 'Set Adrift on Memory Bliss'. A pleasant surprise." Dave Sholin from the Gavin Report wrote, "Hypnotic rap from New Jersey brothers Prince Be and DJ Minutemix [...] not only brings back a memory or two, it's sure to create new ones. It has fresh production elements and a chorus with all the relaxing, calming qualities of a nice long massage. A massive hit overseas, it's set to become just as big in North America thanks to early airplay at key crossover outlets." Everett True from Melody Maker said, "I rather like it—its melding of new age hippychick to old age romantic makes for rather a nice laidback groove and a sure-fire smash."

Alan Jones of Music Week named it Single of the Week, commenting, "A brilliant soundscape starts with some nice vocal work, followed by the drum track from Dennis Edwards' 'Don't Look Any Further' before Spandau Ballet's 'True' leads into a mellow rap. A serene summer smash." A reviewer from Newcastle Evening Chronicle described it as a "dreamy rap song". Johnny Dee from Smash Hits named it Single of the Fortnight, calling it the "dreamiest, most laid-back record ever invented." He added, "Quite what lyrics like "rubber bands expand in a frustrating sigh" mean is a total mystery, but if ever a record could be described as — aherm — like being massaged by a bag of marshmallows, then this is it. Melt city!" While reviewing Of the Heart, of the Soul and of the Cross: The Utopian Experience, the magazine's Gary Kipper stated that the song "is, of course, one of the most summery records ever made". Jonathan Bernstein from Spin wrote, "The hit track, the play track, the ultimate "Huh?" inducer, 'Set Adrift on Memory Bliss' is a classic of languid lassitude. Deadpan as De La doing 'West End Girls', 'Memory' opens with a laconically drawled "The camera pans the cocktail glass behind a blind of plastic plants" and just gets better from there."

== Influence and legacy ==
"Set Adrift on Memory Bliss" was ranked number 19 in NME's list of "Singles of the Year" in December 1991. It was awarded one of BMI's Pop Awards in 1993, honoring the songwriters, composers and music publishers of the song. VH1 ranked it number 81 in their "100 Greatest Songs of Hip Hop." In 2005, Blender ranked it number 94 in their list of "Greatest Songs Since You Were Born". In 2020, Cleveland.com ranked the song number 27 in their list of the best Billboard Hot 100 No. 1 songs of the 1990s, calling it "one of the most unlikely No. 1 hits on this list and maybe the most complex." They added, "Somehow it all amounts to four minutes of hip hop, well, bliss." In 2025, British music magazine Classic Pop ranked it number two in their list of "Top 20 80s Sampling Hits".

The song was parodied in the 1993 film Fear of a Black Hat, as performed by Tone Def (Mark Christopher Lawrence)'s post-N.W.H. group New Human Formantics (also a parody of P.M. Dawn) as a mostly scatological-themed song, "I'm Just A Human Being."

After Prince Be was incapacitated by a stroke in 2005, his cousin Gregory Lewis Carr II, under the name Doc G, took over the P.M. Dawn trademark and music rights. In 2013, Doc G re-recorded "Set Adrift on Memory Bliss" without Prince Be's or DJ Minutemix's input, and for the following decade it was the only available version on all streaming services. The re-recording was described by Rolling Stone magazine as "atrocious" and "cold, heartless, and just plain terrible."

In March 2024, the original recording of "Set Adrift on Memory Bliss" was finally made available on all streaming services.

== Music video ==
The accompanying music video for the song premiered in August 1991 and was directed by American film director Mark Pellington. Spandau Ballet lead singer Tony Hadley appears toward the end of the video.

== Track listings ==
- US 12-inch and maxi-CD single
1. "Set Adrift on Memory Bliss" (extended mix) – 6:04
2. "Set Adrift on Memory Bliss" (radio mix) – 3:57
3. "A Watcher's Point of View (Don't 'Cha Think)" (Youth extended mix) – 6:05
4. "A Watcher's Point of View (Don't 'Cha Think)" (Youth radio mix) – 3:58
- US and Canadian cassette single
1. "Set Adrift on Memory Bliss" (radio mix) – 3:57
2. "A Watcher's Point of View (Don't 'Cha Think)" (Youth radio mix) – 3:58
- UK 7-inch and cassette single
- Australian CD and cassette single
- Japanese mini-CD single
1. "Set Adrift on Memory Bliss" (radio mix)
2. "For the Love of Peace"
- UK 12-inch single

A1. "Set Adrift on Memory Bliss" (extended mix)
A2. "Set Adrift on Memory Bliss" (radio mix)
B1. "Set Adrift on Memory Bliss" (LP version)
B2. "For the Love of Peace"

- UK and Japanese maxi-CD single
1. "Set Adrift on Memory Bliss" (radio mix)
2. "Set Adrift on Memory Bliss" (extended mix)
3. "Set Adrift on Memory Bliss" (LP version)
4. "For the Love of Peace"

== Charts ==
=== Weekly charts ===
Chart (1991–1992)	Peak position
Australia (ARIA)	7
Austria (Ö3 Austria Top 40)	9
Belgium (Ultratop 50 Flanders)	14
Canada Retail Singles (The Record)	2
Canada Top Singles (RPM)	9
Canada Dance/Urban (RPM)	1
Denmark (IFPI)	8
Europe (Eurochart Hot 100)	5
Europe (European Dance Radio)	1
Europe (European Hit Radio)	7
France (SNEP)	17
Germany (GfK)	3
Greece (IFPI)	2
Ireland (IRMA)	5
Israel (Israeli Singles Chart)	13
Italy (Musica e dischi)	10
Luxembourg (Radio Luxembourg)	1
Netherlands (Dutch Top 40)	6
Netherlands (Single Top 100)	4
New Zealand (Recorded Music NZ)	1
Sweden (Sverigetopplistan)	7
Switzerland (Schweizer Hitparade)	4
UK Singles (Official Charts)	3
UK Airplay (Music Week)	10
UK Dance (Music Week)	1
UK Club Chart (Record Mirror)	1
US Billboard Hot 100	1
US 12-inch Singles Sales (Billboard)	1
US Dance Club Play (Billboard)	6
US Hot R&B Singles (Billboard)	16
US Cash Box Top 100	4

=== Year-end charts ===
Chart (1991)	Position
Australia (ARIA)	63
Canada Dance/Urban (RPM)	16
Europe (Eurochart Hot 100)	56
Europe (European Hit Radio)	42
Germany (Media Control)	64
Italy (Musica e dischi)	65
Netherlands (Dutch Top 40)	68
Netherlands (Single Top 100)	64
New Zealand (RIANZ)	30
Sweden (Topplistan)	53
UK Singles (OCC)	35
UK Club Chart (Record Mirror)	38

Chart (1992)	Position
Brazil (Crowley)	61
US Billboard Hot 100	44
US Maxi-Singles Sales (Billboard)	23
US Cash Box Top 100	35

== Certifications ==
Region	Certification	Certified units/sales
Australia (ARIA)	Gold	35,000^{^}
United States (RIAA)	Gold	500,000^{^}
^{^} Shipments figures based on certification alone.

== Release history ==
Region	Date	Format(s)	Label(s)	Ref(s).
United Kingdom	August 5, 1991	7-inch vinyl; 12-inch vinyl; CD; cassette	Gee Street; Island	
Australia	October 7, 1991	CD; cassette	Island	
United States	October 13, 1991	12-inch vinyl; CD; cassette	Gee Street; Island	
Australia	November 18, 1991	12-inch vinyl	Island	
Japan	December 21, 1991	Maxi-CD; mini-CD	Island; Polystar	

== See also ==
- List of Hot 100 number-one singles of 1991 (U.S.)
