= Attrell Cordes =

American rapper (1970–2016)

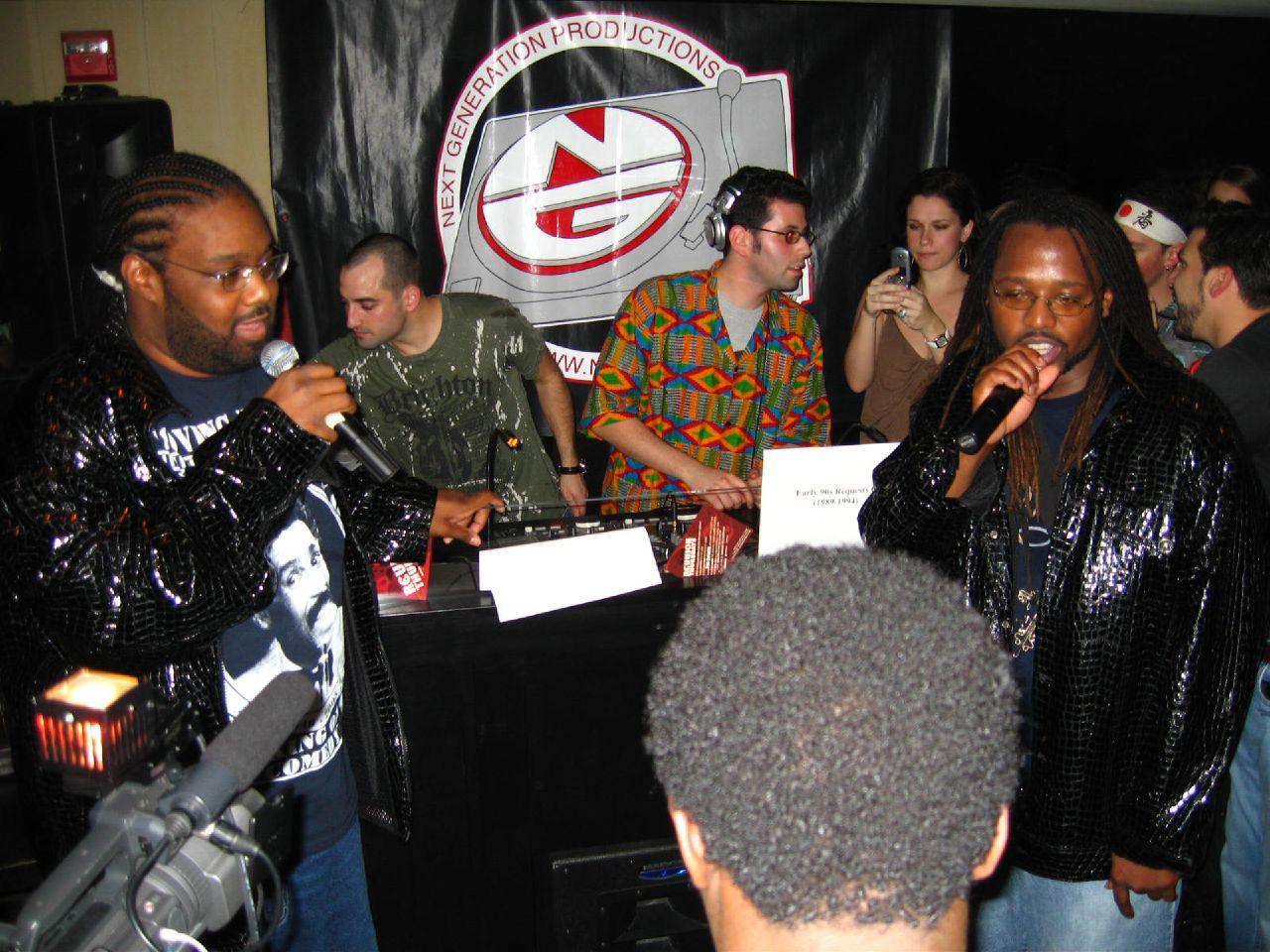
- Attrell "Prince Be" Cordes (left) with his cousin Doc. G (right) performing in 2006

Background information
- Also known as: Prince Be; Prince Be The Nocturnal
- Born: Attrell Stephen Cordes Jr. May 15, 1970; Jersey City, New Jersey, U.S.
- Died: June 17, 2016 (aged 46) Neptune City, New Jersey, U.S.
- Genres: Hip-hop; R&B
- Occupations: Rapper; musician; singer; record producer
- Instrument: Vocals
- Years active: 1988–2016
- Labels: Gee Street; V2; Island
- Formerly of: P.M. Dawn

Attrell Stephen Cordes Jr. (May 15, 1970 – June 17, 2016), also known by the stage name Prince Be, was an American rapper, musician, singer, and record producer. Cordes was the lead vocalist of the hip-hop group P.M. Dawn, which he formed in 1988 with his brother, Jarrett Cordes, also known by DJ Minutemix. Cordes, as the frontman and lyricist for P.M. Dawn, became known for blending rap with singing, as well as ethereal beats and aspects of mysticism and crypto-Christian imagery, to his songs. In 2016, The New York Times called both Cordes and P.M. Dawn "both underappreciated and quietly influential."

== Early life ==
Cordes was born to Janice Carr and Attrell Cordes Sr. in Jersey City, New Jersey, on May 15, 1970. His father died of pneumonia when he and his younger brother, Jarrett were young. His mother later married George Brown, a drummer for Kool & the Gang, who became their stepfather.

== Career ==
Cordes, known on stage as Prince Be, formed P.M. Dawn with his younger brother, Jarrett Cordes, a.k.a. DJ Minutemix, in Jersey City in 1988. The duo created their first demo using $600 that Attrell Cordes had earned while working at a homeless shelter as a nighttime security guard. Attrell Cordes was one of first artists to blend and switch between rap and singing, often in the same song, within his music.

The duo released their first single, "Ode to a Forgetful Mind", in 1989. In 1991, P.M. Dawn released their gold-certified debut album, Of the Heart, of the Soul and of the Cross: The Utopian Experience, much of which was written and produced by Attrell Cordes. The album, a critical and commercial success, was led by the first single, "Set Adrift on Memory Bliss", in which Prince Be and DJ Minutemix sampled Spandau Ballet's 1983 hit, "True", with co-writing credits for Gary Kemp and Attrell Cordes. "Set Adrift on Memory Bliss" became the first single by a black rap group to reach number one on the Billboard Hot 100 and only the third rap artist to reach to the top of that chart overall.

P.M. Dawn's 1993 second album, The Bliss Album...? (Vibrations of Love and Anger and the Ponderance of Life and Existence), was also certified gold. The album's first single, "I'd Die Without You", featured in Eddie Murphy's film Boomerang, released ahead of the album in 1992, reached number 3 on the Hot 100. The album's second single, "Looking Through Patient Eyes", in which Cordes sampled George Michael's "Father Figure", was also a top 10 hit.

Attrell Cordes signature production style, which had its roots in hip hop, blended rapping and singing. Cordes was one of the first hip hop artists and producers to use both vocal styles in the same productions. He often focused on "ethreal" softer sounds, mixed with rap and hip hop. Cordes sampled sounds and rhythms from a diverse range of artists who were often not part of the hip hop genre, including Deep Purple, George Michael, the Monkees and Spandau Ballet.

In a 1991 interview with Details, Cordes caused a very public feud between P.M. Dawn and KRS-One, a rapper from the Bronx. Cordes had made some less-than-glowing remarks regarding KRS-One in the interview, wondering at one point, "KRS-One wants to be a teacher, but a teacher of what?". In retaliation, KRS-One crashed a January 1992 P.M. Dawn concert at The Sound Factory Bar in Manhattan and threw the group off stage.

P.M. Dawn released two more albums, Jesus Wept (1995) and Dearest Christian, I'm So Very Sorry for Bringing You Here. Love, Dad (1998), which were critically acclaimed but failed to match the commercial reception of the earlier studio albums. However, Attrell Cordes found success by producing and writing for other artists throughout the 1990s and 2000s. He wrote a song for Elton John's Duets, which was performed by both John and P.M. Dawn. The duo's final album, F*cked Music, was a mail-order-only release available from the band's website in 2000.

== Personal life and death ==
Cordes endured several serious health problems, including diabetes for more than twenty years. He suffered several strokes, including one in 2005 which resulted in partial paralysis on the left side of his body. One of his legs had to be partially amputated below the knee due to gangrene. He had been living in nursing homes during his final years, as his health deteriorated.

Despite his poor health, Cordes and P.M. Dawn have a strong influence on contemporary rap, including the cloud rap branch of the genre. Jon Caraminca of The New York Times praised Cordes' and P.M. Dawn's contributions, calling them "both underappreciated and quietly influential" in a 2016 obituary. In a 2011 interview, rapper Doc G listed artists who have credited Cordes and P.M. Dawn as influences, telling the interviewer, "Kanye West, T-Pain, Outkast...but you can't mention P.M. Dawn without mentioning De La Soul, and you can't mention Arrested Development without mentioning P.M. Dawn...Everybody begets somebody. We had the weirdness. Now it's okay to be weird; it's okay to wear bizarre things."

P.M. Dawn appeared on a 2005 episode of the NBC reality show, Hit Me, Baby, One More Time. The group, still fronted by an ailing Prince Be, performed their 1991 hit, "Set Adrift on Memory Bliss", as well as a contemporary cover version of Puddle of Mudd's "Blurry" (2001). Cordes, who had just suffered a major stroke that same year, was helped onto the stage and performed the songs from a seat. P.M. Dawn won the episode's competition, defeating Animotion, Juice Newton, Missing Persons and Shannon. The group donated the entire prize of $20,000 to the Juvenile Diabetes Research Foundation, a disease which afflicted Cordes.

On June 17, 2016, Cordes died from kidney disease related to diabetes, at the Jersey Shore University Medical Center in Neptune City, New Jersey, at the age of 46.
