= Gee Street Records =

British record label

- Parent company: Entertainment One Music
- Founded: 1985
- Founder: Jon Baker, Stereo MC's, DJ Richie Rich
- Defunct: 2001
- Status: Defunct
- Distributors: Island Records (1990-1996); V2 Records (1996-2001)
- Genre: Hip hop
- Country of origin: United Kingdom

Gee Street Records was a British hip hop record label started by Jon Baker, Rachel O'Neill, Stereo MC's and DJ Richie Rich in 1985. The label's name came from its original location, a converted warehouse on Gee Street (off Old Street) in London.

Between 1980 and 1984, label head Baker lived in New York City. After returning to London in 1984, he became a hip-hop promoter, and in 1985 opened Gee Street Records and began releasing white-label dance and hip-hop records. Many of these broke new ground. The label developed a roster of prominent domestic UK acts, including DJ Richie Rich, Outlaw Posse, and Stereo MC's, and US acts, including P.M. Dawn, Doug E. Fresh, Gravediggaz, and New Kingdom.

In 1990, Gee Street was acquired by Chris Blackwell's Island Records. After Blackwell left Island and the PolyGram group in 1998, Baker bought back Gee Street and sold it to Richard Branson's fledgling V2 Records. The label was shuttered in 2001.

In 2006, V2 sold its American catalogue, including Gee Street, to Sheridan Square Entertainment, home of Artemis Records. In 2010, Artemis was sold to Entertainment One Music.

== Selected discography ==
- Jungle Brothers, Jungle Brothers, Straight out of the Jungle (1988, licensed from Warlock Records)
- Stereo MCs 33-45-78 (1989) Island Records
- Eternity, Project One (1989)
- Richie Rich, I Can Make You Dance (1988)
- Outlaw Posse, My Afro's on Fire (1989)
- Stereo MCs, Supernatural (1990) Island Records
- PM Dawn, Of the Heart, of the Soul and of the Cross: The Utopian Experience (1991)
- Carlene Davis, Carlene Davis (1992)
- Stereo MCs, Connected (1992) Island Records
- New Kingdom, Heavy Load (1993)
- PM Dawn, The Bliss Album…? (Vibrations of Love and Anger and the Ponderance of Life and Existence) (1993)
- Gravediggaz, 6 Feet Deep (1994)
- Doug E. Fresh, Play (1994)
- PM Dawn, Jesus Wept (1995)
- Malcolm McLaren, Paris (1995)
- Ambersunshower, Walter T. Smith (1996)
- New Kingdom, Paradise Don't Come Cheap (1996)
- Jungle Brothers, Raw Deluxe (1997)
- Gravediggaz, The Pick, the Sickle and the Shovel (1998)
- Various Artists, soundtrack to the motion picture Senseless (1998)
- RZA, Bobby Digital in Stereo (1998)
- PM Dawn, Dearest Christian, I'm So Very Sorry for Bringing You Here. Love, Dad (1998)
- Ky-Mani Marley, The Journey (2000)
- Tragedy Khadafi, Against All Odds (2001)

== See also ==
- Jon Baker
- Lists of record labels
