= The 57th Dynasty =

British hip hop band from London

- Also known as: The Boro 6 Kids; The Dynasty; Brixton's Finest; Fas Fwd Allstars
- Origin: Brixton, London, United Kingdom
- Genres: Hip hop, ragga, grime, jazz rap, alternative hip hop, folk rap
- Years active: 1997–2003, 2014-present
- Label: Fas Fwd Entertainments
- Members: Marcus "Paradise" Dawes; Charlie "Parker" Bucknall

The 57th Dynasty (often known as 57 Dynasty) is a British hip hop group from Brixton, London.

The band was active from 1997 to 2003, then re-formed in 2014 by its two founding members, Charlie "Parker" Bucknall and Marcus "Paradise" Dawes. This eight-man collective, described by Rago Magazine as a "super group," won Best UK Hip Hop Act at the UK Hip Hop Awards and was nominated for both MOBO and Urban Music Awards. Through their indie imprint, FAS FWD Entertainments LTD, the group independently manufactured, produced and distributed music that included: one mixtape, two studio albums, and several EPs, dubplates, and singles. They have been compared favorably to the Wu-Tang Clan. The group has collaborated on recordings and live shows with a wide variety of artists in many musical genres. The 57th Dynasty's original musical style was a mixture of hip hop, bashment, jungle, jazz and spoken word components commonly associated with an early form of grime. NME once described the group's live performance as "a holy chaos with hot-lead hip-hop at its core."

The 57th Dynasty were among the vanguard of the British urban music movement of acts that became popular internationally during the early to mid-2000s. They were at first noted for their infamous hometown of Brixton just as much as much as for their music. The group is now identified with the youthful and rebellious countercultures of hip hop and grime. The group toured both nationally and internationally alongside Eminem, Outkast, DMX, The Roots, Wu-Tang, Common, The Lox, Sean Paul, D12, The Liks, Eve, Jurassic 5, Slum Village, Roni Size, Roots Manuva, Rodney P, Ty, Blak Twang, Klashnekoff, Mark B & Blade and more.

The 57th Dynasty first gained acclaim with their independent debut album The Spoken Word. With no major label backing, the group sold CDs on street corners and out of their cars. Recognized as a landmark album, its singles "Lil Bro," "Love of Hip Hop," "Still I Rise," and "Boro 6" were mainstays on underground pirate radio stations. However it wasn't until BBC Radio 1 DJ Tim Westwood began championing their music that the group catapulted into the national spotlight. Within months of the album's release, John Knight of Southern Record Distributors (SRD) invited The 57th Dynasty to join SRD's roster. "Buyers at chain retailers began calling for stock [of the album] even before a distribution deal through London-based SRD was secured" wrote Billboard.

Following the success of The Spoken Word, and with the emergence of grime music, The 57th Dynasty's second album, Boro 6 Vol. 2 – A Dynasty Truly Like No Other, served as a showcase platform for the talents of other British artists and styles of music. The collaboration-rich album's lead single, "Break Free", featured then-unsigned R&B singer, Estelle. Billboard praised the track for "going against the grain of what's currently popular in terms of subject matter." The 57th Dynasty became the first UK hip hop group to be featured in The Source Magazine. The group was highly influential in shaping the landscape of British urban music, not only for rivaling major labels, but for sitting alongside and influencing policy makers and representatives from media companies. Group member Oshin (Da Nomad) extensively showcased UK talent through his Fab 5 Freddy-esque film series, Independent Hype. At the height of their popularity, the group faced a wave of backlash from Anglo-centric blogs and forums, which sought to discredit the group as sounding too American as a result of lead vocalist Paradise having spent 18 years living in the United States. The band's final album together, The DIY Ethic, was never released. Band member 50:50 (Carl Fearon) died in 2008. In 2009, The 57th Dynasty were included as pioneers in HOMEGROWN! The Story of UK HIP-HOP Exhibition at Urbis, Manchester. Group members Marcus "Paradise" Dawes, Charlie Parker, Oshin and Shineye remain active within the music industry.

== History ==
=== 1996–1998: FasFwd Entertainments ===
Marcus "Paradise" Dawes returned to the UK after spending 18 years in the United States and was introduced by neo-soul singer Stewy "Big" Love to producer/label owner Charlie Parker. This introduction would blossom into the artistic outlet that eventually became The 57th Dynasty. Paradise honed his style of "prison poetry" over Parker's pensive soundscapes, creating the singles "M.O.N.E.Y.", "Et Tu", "Boomerang" and "Crown Jewels". The successful rapper/producer combo performed live throughout the UK and Europe including regular radio broadcast on Choice FM's Friday Night Flavas, hosted by DJ 279. The duo created a consistent buzz and following for themselves with chart successes and rave reviews. Parker's home in Brixton served as label headquarters and as a collaborative artist studio for rappers, reggae artists, singers and musicians. Mr. Green (Baby Hulk), a friend of Bionic of London Posse, was a regular artist in residence and the first to be released on Parker's independent FAS FWD record label.

Paradise sought to form a super group by enlisting rappers from the local Brixton area. Between 1996 and 1999, the highest calibre of artists were chosen to assemble The FAS FWD ALL-STARS. Their official release, No Way, came in 1997 on the double AA-side entitled "M.O.N.E.Y. / No Way" and featured Stretch Lexus, Big Love, Thunda Storm, Paradise, Felony, and Mr. Green produced by Charlie Parker (aka Four:Four). Blues & Soul wrote that "both tracks possess an incredible stamp of authenticity as producer Four:Four turns up the beats. (Rating: 8)". Trace Magazine Hip hop writer Disorda charted the debut at number 9 and included it on his compilation album, UK Hustlerz Volume 3.

The FAS FWD ALL-STARS performed regularly at the local Lambeth Country Show, Brockwell Park, and at numerous hip hop showcases and venues across London including Subterania, Jonzi D's Apricot Jam, DJ 279's Flava of Da Month at Borderline and Mudlumz. The youngest members of Paradise's ensemble formed Juvenile Ruckasz (Lil Monsta, Dark Troopa, 50:50) and were showcased on dubplate specials for Jamaica's Stone Love and King Addis Sound Systems. When Mr. Green brought Bristol rapper Oshin (Da Nomad) to the FAS FWD studio, the eight-piece crew was completed.

The name 57th Dynasty came about when the artists decided the door number of their headquarters should replace "FAS FWD" – allowing for a clear distinction between the record label and the band – and "ALL-STARS" should be replaced with "Dynasty". The group's triangular logo was created by Paradise, and Oshin was instrumental in circulating the group's debut mixtape, Boro 6 (the name given to Brixton by Paradise, who likened the area to a sixth borough of New York City), outside London.

=== 1999–2001: The Spoken Word ===
The Spoken Word album was recorded primarily at Milos Studios, Hoxton Square. The highly acclaimed single, "Lil Bro", a duet between Paradise and thirteen-year-old Lil Monsta, was the final track recorded – in one take – and the first track released. The group's sold-out album launch party at Subterania, Ladbroke Grove included notable attendees such as New York's Hot 97 FM DJ and radio personality, Mister Cee, London Hip Hop Festival founder Kentake Chinyelu-Hope, Kiss FM DJs Big Ted & Shortee Blitz, DJ 279 and various members of Bury Crew/Mudlumz. The 57th Dynasty launched their merchandise imprint, Double F Paraphernalia, that same night, selling FAS FWD Entertainments T-shirts and 57th Dynasty medallions alongside limited-edition vinyl singles, EPs, LPs and CDs. After reaching a distribution deal with SRD in 1999, The 57th Dynasty shot their first independent music video, "Love of Hip Hop." Produced and directed by Merlin Massara, the video marked another UK milestone, being quickly picked up by MTV Europe and broadcast weekly, and becoming the most requested video on Yo! MTV Raps before the MTV Base takeover.

A quote from The Juvenile Ruckasz sums up their recollection of the first independent video shoot:

That's the first video we've recorded – shot on the hottest day of the summer, August, 1999. [Ya] get me? Down Normandy Road, in [the] Myattsfield area. All the kids from the estates came out to watch what was going on, all the people that [were] from the area as well. There was nuff people out there. It was live, but it was a good experience as well cause... that was the first time that I've been on proper camera and been in the camera so that was a good experience.

The 57th Dynasty starred in Vol. 1 and Vol. 2 of famed hip hop clothing outlet Dark 'n' Cold's UK Hip Hop Untapped video series, which documented an emerging UK music scene. In 1999, lead rapper Paradise recorded a four-part advert for Viacom's, VH1 Music First, reaching a new audience and demographic for the group. Their popularity continued to grow with live performances on Nickelodeon and for the 60,000-plus audience at London's millennium night celebrations along the River Thames minutes before London's first major New Year's Eve fireworks display. In 2000, members of the group landed cameo appearances in Fruit Salad Films' BIFA-nominated South West 9, and their song, "Pharaoh Intellect", was added to the Stereo MCs' mix album, DJ-Kicks: Stereo MCs. The 57th Dynasty's motto is "There would be no concept of what far is, were it not for those willing to go to the extreme." Led by the tech-savvy, progressive partnership of Charlie and Paradise, the group embraced new technologies, producing enhanced CDs and releasing digital downloads in 2003, three years before the birth of the iTunes Music Store. Newly formed online record company, Peoplesound.com, licensed "Lil Bro" to their digital catalogue and made it freely available online via their website. "Lil Bro" received over 20,000 downloads, prompting the company's A&R manager, Dave VJ, to comment "57th Dynasty are really big on the site and have what it takes to make it in the US." The 57th Dynasty began touring internationally, to Sweden (Stockholm), Finland (Helsinki, Tampere, Jyväskylä), Denmark (Copenhagen), Italy (Bologna, Milan, Turin), Belgium (Brussels) and France (Nice). At home, they featured, performed and collaborated with other acts, and played festivals and Notting Hill Carnival.

=== 2002–2003: Boro 6 Vol. 2 – A Dynasty Truly Like No Other ===
In 2002, The 57th Dynasty released their follow-up album, Boro 6 Vol. 2 – A Dynasty Truly Like No Other. Executive-produced by Charlie "Parker" Bucknall and Marcus "Paradise" Dawes, it sold better than their previous effort. The album's polished production stood in contrast to their first release, and the industry took notice of the group's progression. The album heavily featured new talent alongside established artists. Singer Estelle and UK rappers MCD, Ace, Funky DL, Bury Crew, Scor-zay-zee (Out Da Ville), Swaybe Lee, Cerose (Black Rhino), Titan Sounds affiliates, Extremist and DJ IQ featured on the album. Like its predecessor, Boro 6 Vol. 2 – A Dynasty Truly Like No Other earned the group high accolades and acclaim. The album featured a production style dubbed "mix n blend," a fusion of hip hop, reggae and jazz. Hits from this album included "Brethren and Sistren", "Rough Life", "If", "Hooligans", "Ghetto Gold", "Break Free" and "Hold Strong", the latter two featuring Estelle. There is a noted level of maturity in the contributions from group members, including The Juvenile Ruskasz. Lil Monsta's solo performance on "If", 50:50's "Hold Strong" and Dark Troopa's lead placement on "Break Free" are contributions to what Britishblackmusic.com called an "intelligent, hard, dark, mellow, sweet, upbeat" album.

In 2002, Channel U heads Charlie and Darren Platt headhunted the group, soliciting new material for the station to give it an edge over new rival MTV Base. DJ Tim Westwood added "Hooligans" to his BBC Radio 1 playlist and his UK Hip Hop 2002, Vol. 1 album. In August 2002, BBC Radio launched the new black music digital radio station, 1xtra. Playing a selection of the best contemporary black music, the new station's debut was marked with an exclusive dubplate by The 57th Dynasty. Labels such as Def Jam UK, Mercury Records, Polydor and V2 Records were said to be interested in signing the group. Charlie Parker flew to New York to negotiate a deal around this time. By 2003, the popularity of "urban" music was at an unprecedented high in the UK as rapping/singing garage pop groups such as So Solid and Big Brovaz were being signed to major record labels and achieving chart success. In this same year, home secretary David Blunkett and culture minister Kim Howells accused rappers of glorifying the thug life and turning guns into fashion accessories. The Wessex Scene described The 57th Dynasty's brand of music as harsh realities of a contemporary upbringing, a stark contrast to the commercially successful pop rap groups of the time. With a reputation for being tied to violence and gang culture, the political and public glare meant the group remained unsigned.

In 2003, The 57th Dynasty were nominated for Best Hip Hop Act at the Urban Music Awards. The group deliberately did not appear at the high-profile ceremony held at Hammersmith Palais. Group members worked on individual projects and collaborated heavily with other artists, including Charlie Parker's contribution to Paper Chasers, which premiered at the 2003 Tribeca Film Festival. However, the album that was said to be in the works, DIY Ethic, did not materialise and was postponed indefinitely as relationships between group members deteriorated. In August 2007, Britishhiphop.co.uk reported rumours that the group had broken up.

== Members ==
The original members of The 57th Dynasty were rappers Michael Baiden (Lil Monsta), Carl Byron Fitzroy Fearon (50:50) and Gilbert Baiden (Dark Troopa) – collectively known as "Juvanile Ruckasz" and later, "Da Mans Dem" – Dennis Baiden (Thunda Storm), Marcus "Paradise" Dawes (now known as WhoIsParadise) and Lawrence J. Oshin (Oshin). In-house music producers Charlie Bucknall (Charlie Parker) and Steven Edwards (Shineye), under the production moniker Watch No Face Productions, completed the eight-man collective.

=== Band members ===
==== Current members ====
- Paradise − lead rapper (1997–present)
- Charlie Parker − producer (1997–present)

==== Former members ====
- Thunda Storm − reggae artist (1997–2003)
- Oshin − rapper (1997–2003)
- 50:50 − rapper (1997–2003)
- Dark Troopa − rapper (1997–2003)
- Lil Monsta − rapper (1997–2003)
- Shineye − producer (1997–2003)

==== Guest members ====
- Felony (Patrick Baiden) − rapper (1997–1998)
- Stretch Lexus (Mark Whizza) - rapper ( 1997–1998
- Mr Green − jungle mc (1997)
- Stretch Lexus − rapper (1997–1998)
- Big Love (Stuey Love) − singer (1997–1999)
- Preacher's Son − singer (1999)
- The Downtown Crew − reggae artists (1998–1999)
- Archer − reggae artist (1997–1998)
- Swaybe Lee − reggae artist (1998–1999)
- Garvey − rapper (1997)
- Mick & Barry − rappers (1997)

== Feud with Jay Z ==
In 1999, Jay Z and Dame Dash were approached by Paradise at the 1999 MOBO Awards ceremony, where both parties were nominated for awards. While The 57th Dynasty members vacated their box seats in favour of networking and promoting with industry executives on the main floor of the auditorium, Paradise took a seat at Dame and Jay's reserved table and presented the pair with CDs for sale. The conversation that ensued revolved around questions from the duo about the name The 57th Dynasty and its meaning. Paradise gave the pair a CD and continued on towards Radio 1 DJ Tim Westwood, who sat in security isolation, as he had recently been shot in Brixton after performing at the Lambeth Country Show.

In December of that same year, Jay Z released Vol. 3... Life and Times of S. Carter. On the song, Pop 4 Roc, featuring Beanie Sigel, Memphis Bleek and Amil, Jay Z says "You are about to witness a dynasty like no other", a statement many felt was directed at The 57th Dynasty. The streets and internet buzzed at the prospect of an international rivalry. During a scheduled radio interview in the Old Truman Brewery, Brick Lane, The Homegrown Consortium made the argument for retaliation. Paradise freestyled an on-air diss directed at Jay Z and later recorded "Coincidences" with producer Shineye. Although performed live, the track was never released; the group chose to promote their successes rather than fuel the already growing public perception that The 57th Dynasty were merely thugs and gangsters or, as Westwood stated, "living that street life".

In 2000, Jay Z released The Dynasty: Roc La Familia, continuing his use of the word "dynasty" in his work. Derek A. Bardowell of The Source wrote, "Brixton-based rap collective 57th Dynasty is not in this business to make people feel comfortable. Just ask Jay-Z." He also noted that "British rap is picking up momentum in the States" in his article welcoming The 57th Dynasty as the first British hip hop group to feature in the publication.

In January 2003, reports surfaced across the Internet connecting The 57th Dynasty to both the Westwood shooting and Dame Dash's alleged beating in Les Halles, Paris, including the AllHipHop.com headline: "Damon Dash Beat Down Was Ordered". The Scandinavian hip hop magazine Kingsize reported that "57th Dynasty from Brixton must have been pissed off when Jay-Z and Roc-A-Fella released The Dynasty: Roc La Familia, and argued that the concept belonged to them." The article goes on to say "Tim Westwood was according to rumors shot and injured a few years back because he would not support the 57th Dynasty."

== Controversies ==
The 57th Dynasty have had several controversies throughout their career. Clashes with promoters, DJs and bouncers, and highly publicised feuds with fellow artists, have beset the group, often accused of being too pro-black in their message.

=== The Roots ===
In 1999, Black Thought of the legendary Roots met The 57th Dynasty for the first time at Milos Studios whilst the group recorded their debut album, The Spoken Word. The meeting was cordial and Black Thought even took pictures with Dynasty members. Later that year, both groups played a number of UK hip hop concerts together, including Glastonbury and Brixton Academy. At Glastonbury, Questlove challenged Lil Monsta about the similarities of the two groups' names. Unknown to anyone at the time, Questlove claimed a moniker for his group other than The Roots. On "Ain't Sayin' Nothin' New" (featuring Dice Raw) from their fourth studio album, Things Fall Apart, Black Thought of The Roots is heard rapping "I represent the legendary Fifth Dynasty crew". The two groups met again at Brixton Academy for Hip hop Phenomenon '99, a line-up that included Jurassic 5, Slum Village, DJ Cash Money, Kool Keith and more. DJ Noize, Supernatural, DJ Cash Money and The 57th Dynasty performed in the venue's foyer, a setting they were not pleased with. The makeshift stage was not stable enough to support the weight of six bouncing performers, so The 57th Dynasty's vinyl record players continuously jumped as the turntables jerked under the group's animated performance. Not happy with either the location or the bandstand, the group entered the main hall and stormed the main stage. Performing at the time were The Roots. Paradise took the mic from Black Thought and the other 57th Dynasty performers charged onto the stage. The Roots exited without incident as The 57th Dynasty performed "Boro 6".

=== Nickelodeon ===
On 29 May 1999, The 57th Dynasty appeared on Nickelodeon UK's Live Studio Music Performances. Due to the child-friendly nature of the channel, the group performed "Lil Bro" before a live studio audience. After the performance, cast and crew members argued about the nature of the song's controversial lyrics. One crew member commented that the show might as well have the far-right British National Party on the following week.

=== Terrorism ===
In September 2006, Gilbert Baiden (Dark Troopa) was pictured on the front page of the South London Press as a terror suspect; the headline read "Why Young Men Are Turning To Terror". Baiden's arrest was covered by local, national and international press. The Mirror reported that the arrests reflected an increasing number of young British blacks who grew up in Christian families but had recently converted to the Muslim faith. The article went on to say that anti-terrorist police were "very confident" there would be charges for serious terrorism offences. Although Scotland Yard applied to magistrates to extend the time they could keep the suspects in custody for questioning, 25-year-old Baiden was one of two men released without charge. Baiden's family, which included four brothers, two of whom were also members of The 57th Dynasty and another of whom was an affiliate artist, protested Baiden's innocence alongside friends and loved ones insisting the arrest to be just another blunder like Forest Gate, the ill-fated £2.2 million police operation that resulted in the wrongful raid and shooting of brothers Abdul Kahar and Abul Koyair by anti-terrorist police.

Crime reporter Ben Ashford of the South London Press wrote that according to one of South London's leading Muslims, Toaha Qureshi, impressionable black youngsters were being preyed on by ruthless terror masterminds, hell-bent on future 7/7-style atrocities. The report went on to name Baiden as a British citizen who had converted to Islam four years prior and worshipped at South London mosques. The arrests coincided with the rise in so-called Muslim street gangs, including the Muslimeen and Muslim Boys (an offshoot of PDC). Baiden was released without charge four days after his arrest, following Toaha Qureshi's statements that "this family have good standing in the community and [the Baiden brothers] seem to be decent, ambitious young men, and they deny any involvement in terrorism.

== Awards and nominations ==
Year	Awards	Category	Result
1999	MOBO	Best Hip Hop Act	Nominated
2000	UK Hip Hop Awards	Best UK Hip Hop Act	Winner
2003	Urban Music Awards	Best Hip Hop Act	Nominated

== Concerts and tour chronology ==
- October 1998 − 10,000 Man March @ Trafalgar Square
- March 1999 − Z Bar, Brixton
- March 1999 − Blue Mountain Club, Bristol
- March 1999 − Thekla, Bristol
- March 1999 − Malcolm X Centre, Bristol
- March 1999 − Capital Club, London
- March 1999 − The Ritzy, Brixton
- April 1999 − The Plug, Stockwell
- April 1999 − London College of Music, Ealing
- May 1999 − Subterania, London
- May 1999 − Coliseum, Coventry
- May 1999 − Flava of the Month @ Subterania [Spoken Word Album Launch]
- May 1999 − The Loughborough Junction, Brixton
- May 1999 − Club Adestra, Wolverhampton
- June 1999 − On Route @ Imperial Gardens
- June 1999 − Hip Hop Phenomenon '99 @ Brixton Academy
- June 1999 − Dance Tent @ Glastonbury Festival
- July 1999 − St. Paul's Carnival, Bristol
- July 1999 − Lambeth Country Show
- July 1999 − Shepherd's Bush Empire
- July 1999 − Dingwalls, Camden
- July 1999 − Liquid, Wandsworth
- July 1999 − Leyton Festival
- July 1999 − Youth Slam @ Imani Centre, Manchester
- July 1999 − Sheffield
- August 1999 − Brixton Carnival
- August 1999 − Fozzies, Birmingham
- August 1999 − Paris-London Connexion @ WKD, Camden
- August 1999 − Homegrown Freestyle Float @ Notting Hill Carnival
- September 1999 − Band on the Wall, Manchester
- October 1999 − Wolverhampton University
- October 1999 − Fabric, London (Opening Night)
- December 1999 − Big Time @ River Thames, Waterloo
- July 2000 − Dekefex @ Mass, St Matthew's Church, Brixton
- August 2000 − V Festival
- September 2000 − Stratford Rex
- April 2001 − Diesel U-Music Awards @ Shepherd's Bush Empire
- May 2001 − Dekefex @ Mass, St Matthew's Church, Brixton
- May 2001 − Rough & Ready B-Ball Tournament @ Brixton Rec
- May 2001 − UMS (Press Launch) @ Red Cube Bar, Leicester Sq.
- June 2001 − London Hip Hop Festival @ Ocean, Hackney
- June 2001 − UMS @ The Drum, Birmingham
- June 2001 − Astoria
- August 2001 − Madame JoJo's
- February 2002 − Manchester Academy 3, Manchester
- March 2002 − Mass, St Matthew's Church, Brixton
- May 2002 − Oval House Theatre
- November 2002 − 1xtra Elements of Hip hop – @ SE One London
- January 2003 − Injustice Screening @ White Post Lane, Hackney
- May 2003 − Dekefex @ Mass, St Matthew's Church, Brixton

In addition to the above tour information, The 57th Dynasty also performed at Rise Festival, Love Music Hate Racism, Ten Rooms, Club Ezekiel, Peckham, Temple (Westwood), Z Bar, Brixton (Cappadonna show)

== Discography ==
=== Studio albums ===
- The Spoken Word (1999)
- Boro 6 Vol. 2 – A Dynasty Truly Like No Other (2002)
- The DIY Ethic (unreleased)

=== Compilation albums ===
- DJ-Kicks: Stereo MCs (1999)
- Free Mumia Abu-Jamal (2000)
- UK Hip Hop Awards (2001)
- A Wireless Nation Vol. 1: The 'Letter to Tony Blair' (2002)
- Peoplesound & HHC Presents: Straight From The Underground
- Westwood: UK Hip Hop 2002 Vol. 1 (2002)

=== EPs ===
- The Spoken Word EP (1999)

=== Singles ===
- "Boro 6" / "Lil Bro" (1999)
- "Love Of Hip Hop" (1999)
- "Return To Boro 6" / "Dirty South" (2000)
- "Ghetto Gold" / "Hold Strong" (2000) featuring Estelle
- "Break Free" (2002) featuring Estelle

=== Mixtapes ===
- Boro 6

=== Dubplates ===
- King Addis Sound System
- Stone Love Sound System
- 1xtra Dubplate

== Filmography ==
- South West 9 (1998)
- The Pioneers: The British Hip Hop Documentary (2002)
- UK Hip hop Untapped Vol. 1 (2001, documentary)
- The Rise of 57th Dynasty: Brixton, Beats & Rhymes (2002, documentary)
- Independent Hype Vol. 1 (2003, documentary)
- UK Hip hop Untapped Vol. 2 (2004, documentary)
