= Cath Coffey =

British musician

Catherine Muthoni Coffey (born c. 1965, Eldoret, Kenya) is a British singer who was one of the earliest members of British hip hop band Stereo MCs. The single "Elevate My Mind", from the Stereo MCs album Supernatural, in which Coffey was the backing vocalist, was the first British rap single to reach the U.S. Billboard Hot 100.

The Stereo MCs released their album Connected in 1992, with Coffey featured on the tracks "Connected", "Ground Level" and "Step It Up".

Coffey was featured on the second album by Tricky, Nearly God, released in 1996. In 1997, she released Mind the Gap, a solo album available only in Japan, on Island Records.

== Discography ==
=== Albums ===
Year	Album	Track	Additional information
1990	Supernatural	"Elevate My Mind"	Second album by Stereo MCs Lead vocals
1992	Connected	All Tracks	Third album by Stereo MCs Vocals
1996	Nearly God	"I Sing for You"	Side project by Tricky which includes artists such as Björk and Neneh Cherry Additional vocals
1997	Mind the Gap	All Tracks	Artist's debut album
1998	Fearless	"Streets Desire"	Album by Junior Delgado Lead vocals
1999	Close the Door	"Turn Around", "Midnight Melodic", "Sweet Bitter Love", "Midnight Melodic (Chase The Blues)"	Debut album by Terranova Lead and additional vocals
2001	Deep Down & Dirty	Most Tracks	Fourth album by Stereo MCs Vocals
2002	Hitchhiking Non-Stop With No Particular Destination	"Breath", "Out of My Head (aka. Ah Uht Mi Hed)", "Running Away"	Second album by Terranova Vocals

=== Singles and EPs ===
Year	Song	UK	Album
1997	"Say What You Say"	78	Mind the Gap
1997	"Tell Me"	—	Mind the Gap
1999	"Walk With Me"	—	OST Long Hello & Short Goodbye
