= WhoIsParadise =

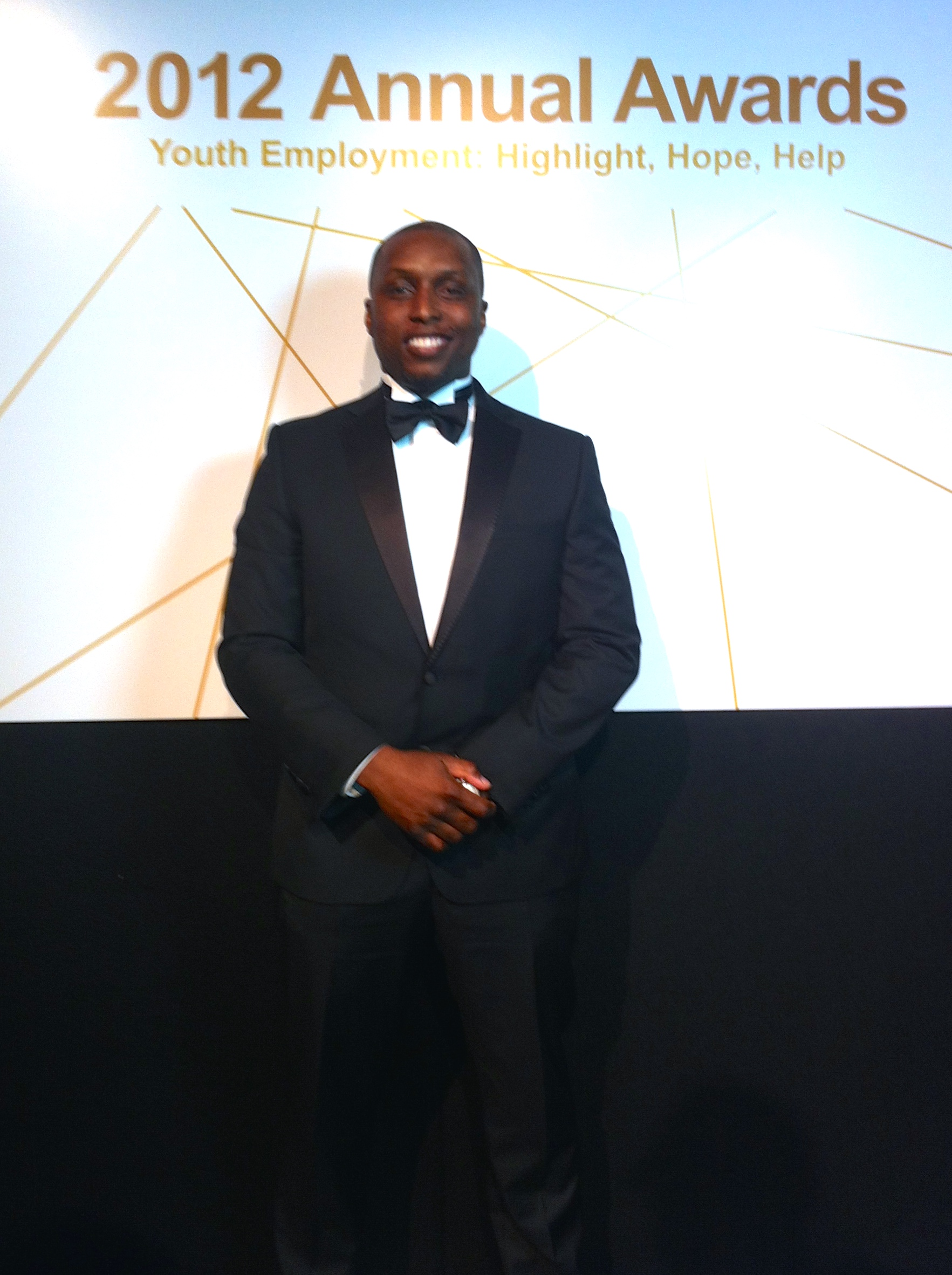
- Marcus Paradise Dawes at RfO Awards 2012

Background information
- Also known as: Paradise [The Prolific One]
- Born: Marcus Paul Duane Dawes; 23 February 1973 (age 53); Brent, London, England
- Origin: NYC, U.S.
- Genres: Hip hop, spoken word
- Occupations: Rapper; poet; songwriter; community activist; philanthropist
- Instrument: Vocals
- Years active: 1996–present
- Labels: Fas Fwd Entertainments; Prolific Entertainments
- Member of: The 57th Dynasty
- Website: whoisparadise.uk

Marcus "Paradise" Dawes (born 23 February 1973), also known by his stage names Paradise and whoisPARADISE, is a British rapper, poet, songwriter and community activist. He is the co-founder and frontman of the Brixton-based hip hop group, the 57th Dynasty.

Raised in the United States, he spent his childhood and teenage years in New York City. Mentored by the Black Panthers as a youth, Paradise's lyrics frequently use social and political themes inspired by personal experiences. During The 57th Dynasty's early years, Paradise's lyrics contributed to their rebellious and spiritual tone. His debut and sophomore albums with the group, The Spoken Word (1996) and Boro 6 Vol. 2 - A Dynasty Truly Like No Other (2002) are considered landmark albums.

Outside the group, he is former Director at Young People Matter charity and resides as its Senior Project Coordinator. As a label executive, brand consultant and songwriter, he has worked with artists such as Amplify Dot, Coldsteps, Noni Zondi, Estelle and JJC. His writing & production credits include Alan Kasirye, Arrow Benjamin, Big Brovaz, Krafty Kuts, KRS-One, Omar, Silvastone, Skinnyman, Sounds of Blackness, Stereo MCs and DJ Tim Westwood. Paradise is widely known for his community activism and concern for youth. He has organized and performed in several benefit concerts and at high-profile events including the African Music Awards. In British press, Paradise is referred to as

A musician who uses his creativity to inspire young people.

— Lindsay Burns, South London Press

He has received several awards and nominations for both his music and community work. He is a philanthropic performing artist, having worked with the YMCA, Black Cultural Archives, VH1, RESEO (the European Network of Opera Education), The Metropolitan Black Police Association, British Black Music and the Sickle Cell Society.

== Early life ==
Born in London, England, Dawes is of mixed background—his mother is of Jamaican descent, while his father is of West African descent, hailing from Sierra Leone. He often states his ethnicity as "Westward - West Indian, West African and being born and raised in the two major cities of the West [London and New York]".

An only child until his teens, Dawes was raised by his mother and grandmother after the family migrated to the United States from the United Kingdom in 1979. The family originally settled in the ethnically divided Jewish and Italian neighborhoods of the East Bronx. Dawes graduated from Martin L. King High School in Manhattan. He previously attended John F. Kennedy High School, Evander Childs High School and Harry S. Truman High School, none of which he remained at for longer than one semester. In Junior High School, Dawes adopted the name "Paradise", a nickname received for his exploits with women. At Martin L. King High School, Dawes was accepted into the Academy of Finance programme which upon completing, he accepted an internship at accounting firm Peat, Marwick, Mitchell & Company (KPMG). In his music, he refers to having been kicked out of school, involved in selling illicit drugs, and serving time in prison. He has also referred to his introspective style of rap as prison poetry.

== Music career ==
=== Beginnings ===
Paradise's entertainment career began in the late 1990s, upon returning to the UK after 18 years stateside. Paradise met producer/label owner, Charlie Parker in Brixton and the two began production work, creating the singles "M.O.N.E.Y.", "Et Tu", "Boomerang" and "Crown Jewels". Together, they laid the groundwork for what would eventually become the award-winning 57th Dynasty. Their rapper/producer combination achieved chart success and rave reviews. The two performed throughout the UK and Europe releasing singles under Charlie's fledgling record label, Fas Fwd Entertainments.

=== 1998–2001: Boro 6 Mixtape and The Spoken Word ===
In 1998, Fas Fwd Entertainments released the Boro 6 Mixtape which debuted a talented roster of Brixton artists who, under Paradise's watchful eye, were forming into a supergroup. With no major label deal, the fledgling label and group set to selling the mixtape themselves. The eight-track recording features The Fas Fwd Allstars' "BORO 6 freestyle (4,3,2,1)" over LL Cool J's "4, 3, 2, 1" instrumental, the result was a hit with local pirate radio. The Boro 6 Mixtape served as a sampler showcasing the talents of the Fas Fwd Entertainments roster many of whom would become members of The 57th Dynasty. Popular songs, "Pattern 57", "Lil Bro", and "Words, Power & Sound" featured on the mixtape which began as an EP.

In 2001, Fas Fwd Entertainments released the highly acclaimed debut album, The Spoken Word by The 57th Dynasty. Headed by Paradise, the group were nominated Best Hip hop Act at the 1999 MOBO Awards. Echoes called the album a British landmark whilst CD Universe called it an extremely impressive debut album.

=== 2002–2004: Boro 6 Vol. 2 – A Dynasty Truly Like No Other ===
In 2002, The 57th Dynasty released their second album, Boro 6 Vol. 2. The album featured notable appearances from Estelle, Ace (Ace and Vis), Funky DL, and Scor-zay-zee (Out Da Vil). Boro 6 Vol. 2 delivered on a unique hi-bred production value dubbed 'mix n blend'; a fusion of Hip hop, Reggae and Jazz. Noteworthy hits from this album included "Brethren and Sistren", "Rough Life", "If", "Hooligans", "Ghetto Gold", "Break Free" and "Hold Strong", the latter two both featuring Estelle. The group appeared on BBC Radio 1's DJ Tim Westwood's UK Hip Hop 2002 Vol. 1 album as well as embarking on a national tour. In 2003 the group were nominated, Best Hip Hop Act at the Urban Music Awards. It was around this time that group members began to cite creative differences. The group's third album, DIY Ethic was ever released.

=== Solo career ===
Throughout his career as a solo artist, Paradise writes and independently releases music. In 2001 he worked with Krafty Kuts to create "Who's Da Man" for the Vinnie Jones starred, Mean Machine film soundtrack. He recorded and co-executive produced the critically acclaimed "U Must Learn, UK", featuring KRS-One, Skinnyman, and MCD, produced by Charlie Parker. Paradise wrote and recorded the UK Garage song "2 Step Flavas" with chart topping producers Trick Or Treat who previously charted at (#16) with a remix of "Let Me Be Your Fantasy". "2 Step Flavas" was exclusively purchased by Go! Beat sublabel FTL and received rave reviews. Paradise recorded a PSA for VH1's Music First in addition to filming a pilot programme for MTV entitled Bite Size.

Paradise worked with JJC and various artists to craft the UK remix of the "We Are Africans" Afro beats song-series which featured Sway and Femi Kuti and showcased regional artists from the US, UK, Nigeria, Sierra Leone, Zimbabwe, and Ghana. He has worked with a wide range of artists from across Africa including award-winning afro beats producer Silvastone (Sierra Leone / Ghana), Sha (Ghana), Noni Zondi (South Africa) and Magnum (Nigeria). In 2012, Paradise executive produced #Two4Se7enEP. The accompanying Black History themed music video was screened at Latimer Creative Media's Youth Film showcase, UK Urban Webfest and Tight Shorts.

== Philanthropy ==
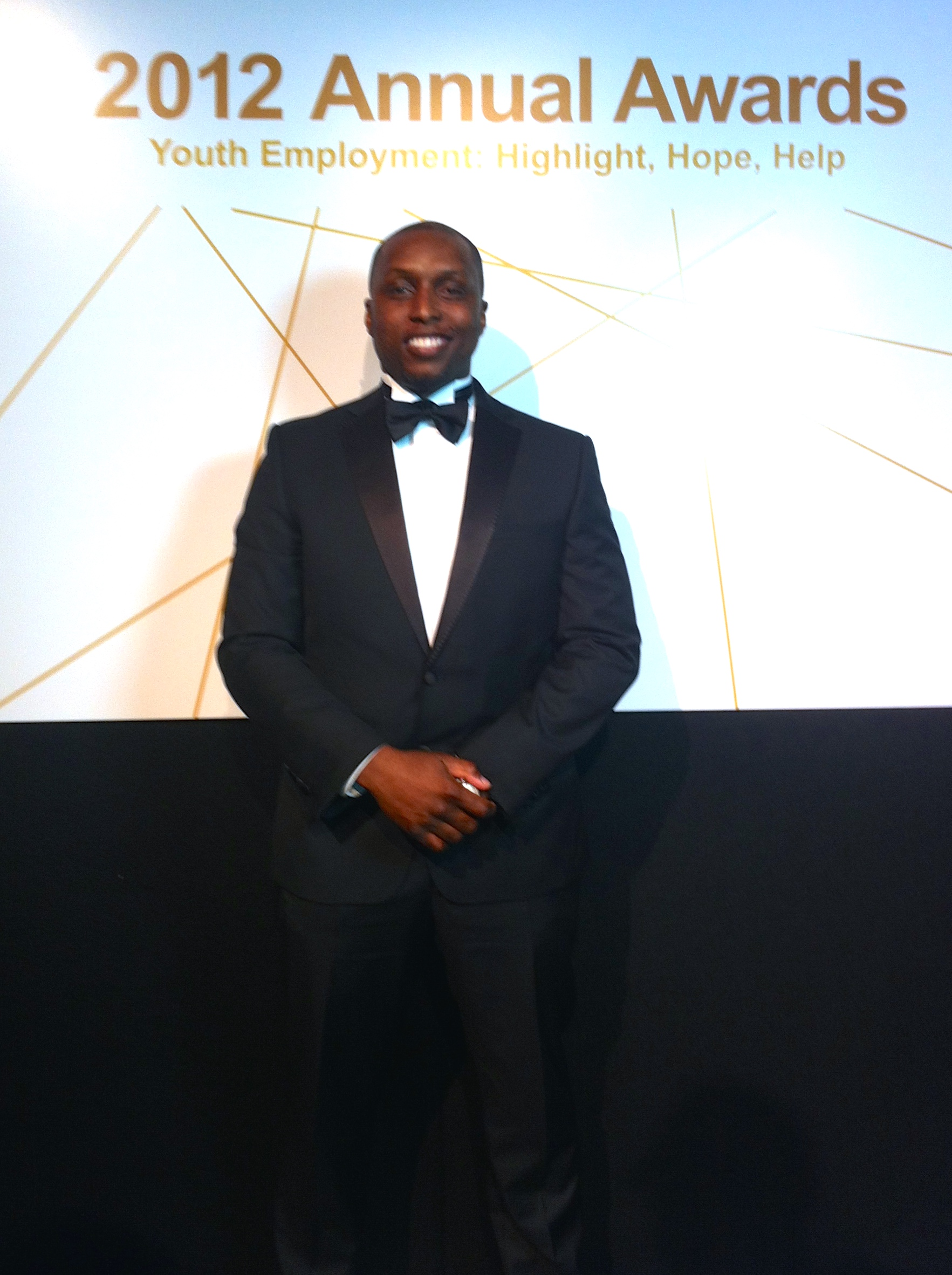
Marcus Dawes at the 2012 RfO Awards, London

Paradise has won multiple leadership awards. He is an advocate for BAME communities.

Paradise trained and mentored emerging talent from the surrounding Nairobi slums as part of Roundtable Films' social issues and political entertainment documentary series, Kenya Rise Up. His voluntary work to raise the profile of the conditions and increase the demand for services for people with sickle cell and thalassaemia saw him invited to the Houses of Parliament with Dawn Hill and Baroness Howells.

=== Hip H'opera ===
In 2006 Paradise teamed with Glyndebourne Opera House for the critically acclaimed hip hopera, School 4 Lovers. The production premiered at Glyndebourne and toured Finnish National Opera and Estonia. Hilary Finch of The Times said Paradise controlled a Cosi fan tutte such as Glyndebourne has never seen before. In The Independent's, four-star review, Michael Church wrote Donnie is played by the charismatic Paradise, who sets up exactly the right buzz of expectation.

But Donnie, played by a man known only as Paradise, formed the pivot of the action as narrator and instigator of the drama. In his black hat and neck-chain, Paradise made a suspiciously plausible pimp and hustler, rhyming his way sleekly through the twists of the plot.

— Adam Sweeting, The Telegraph

=== The Good Samaritan Music Project ===
Motivated to address rises in youth homicides, Paradise created his own philanthropic music endeavour, "The Good Samaritan Music Project" in 2005. In 2006 he recruited influential hip hop artists, KRS-One and Skinnyman to contribute to the project's debut single, "U Must Learn [UK]". The song was heralded as a hip-hop classic following in the traditions of Tribe Called Quest, Boogie Down Productions, The Roots, Public Enemy and Jurassic 5.

=== Black Cultural Archives and Stockwell Matters ===
In 2014, Paradise worked alongside members of the newly formed Black Cultural Archives' Youth Forum on their first event - "#Checkurselfie", which explored the past, present and future of campaigning through photography as part of a five-year partnership between the Victoria & Albert Museum and Black Cultural Archives titled Staying Power. Later that year, he spearheaded "Stockwell Matters", a winning People's Millions, National Lottery campaign. The partnership between Big Lottery Fund and ITV saw "Stockwell Matters" receive the greater number of votes in a televised public competition broadcast on the network's London regional news. Paradise's televised interview was viewed by approximately 150,000 people. "Stockwell Matters" is seen as the sequel to "Our Place: Community Matters"; funding made available by the Department for Communities and Local Government also secured and successfully managed by Dawes on behalf of Young People Matter Charity.

=== One Spirit ===
Alongside fellow 57th Dynasty co-founder, Charlie Parker, Paradise is a mentor and facilitator on the Hackney Music Development Trust's (HMDT), BBC Children in Need sponsored, One Spirit project. The project supports young offenders, helping them towards successful rehabilitation and pathways to training, education and employment. The project is delivered inside HMP Feltham Young Offenders Institute which Paradise likens to New York's own adolescent building on Rikers Island. The project has been featured in a televised BBC Children In Need Appeal.

== The Black Panthers ==
Paradise met imprisoned Black Panther/Black Liberation Army member, Teddy Jah Heath in Auburn maximum security prison. For the alleged kidnapping of a drug-dealer, Heath was serving life imprisonment, convicted by an all-white jury of 1st degree kidnapping and conspiracy, attempted grand larceny and 3rd degree criminal possession of a weapon. Paradise describes Heath as a friend, mentor, political prisoner and revolutionary inspiration.

The political education received from Heath can be seen and heard in much of Paradise's music and social endeavours such as the Young People Matter annual Black History programme which takes at risk London youth to the International Slavery Museum, Liverpool. In 2014, Paradise joined forces with Brixton Pound to commemorate local hero and community activist Olive Morris.

== Recognition ==
In 1999, 57th Dynasty were nominated for Best Hip Hop Act at the 1999 MOBO Awards. Subsequent nominations came in 2000 and 2003 from the UK Hip Hop Awards and Urban Music Awards respectively, with Paradise's group winning Best Hip Hop Act (2000). In 2011, Paradise won Runner-Up "Community Campaigner" at South London Press's Our Heroes Awards. The following year, he shared a "Highly Commended" win with corporate partner, Hyde Housing at the Race for Opportunity, Business in The Community Awards for his leadership role in their diverse youth employment programme. In 2013, the One Spirit project was added to the Youth Justice Board's effective practice library.
