= Connected (Stereo MC's song) =

1992 single by Stereo MCs

Single by Stereo MC's

from the album Connected
- B-side: "Disconnected"; "Fever"
- Released: 14 September 1992
- Genre: Hip hop; funk; acid jazz; dance
- Length: 5:16 (album version); 3:59 (single version)
- Label: 4th & B'way; Gee Street
- Songwriters: Harry Wayne Casey; Richard Finch; Nick Hallam; Rob Birch
- Producer: Stereo MC's

Stereo MC's singles chronology
"Lost in Music" (1991)	"Connected" (1992)	"Step It Up" (1992)

Music video
- "Connected" on YouTube

"Connected" is a song by British hip hop/electronic music group Stereo MC's. It is the title track of their third studio album, and was released in September 1992 by Gee Street and Island Records as the album's lead single. The song samples "Let Me (Let Me Be Your Lover)" by Jimmy "Bo" Horne and peaked at number 18 on the UK Singles Chart. Internationally, "Connected" peaked within the top 10 of the charts in Austria, Sweden and Switzerland, and entered the top 20 of the charts in Belgium, Finland and the United States.

The song's music video, directed by Matthew Amos, received a nomination at the 1993 MTV Video Music Awards. NME and Melody Maker ranked "Connected" number 16 and 19 in their list of "Singles of the Year" in December 1992. The song later appeared in the 1995 movie Hackers, and it was the theme to the Rob Lowe programme Dr. Vegas (2004).

== Background and release ==
Rob Birch and Nick Hallam of Stereo MCs grew up as next-door neighbours in Nottingham. They both moved to London and released their debut album as Stereo MC’s in 1989, 33-45-78. "Connected" was made after three years of touring. It was also one of the last tracks they did for the album by same name. Group member Hallam told in a 2023-interview with The Guardian, "We had the chorus, but had hit a cul-de-sac. Rob and me went to the studio, put the track on and thought: "Let's see if we can at least get the vibe we need to nail it." Rob started jamming around the vocal: "Aiii Aiii Aiii." We looped it up and put it through the whole song. Then Rob went back in and did the rest of the vocals – and that was it."

The group used a rudimentary sampler, a Bel Delay Unit, for the "Aiii Aiii Aiii" bits. Vocalist Birch recalled, "It was a godsend: you could get a beat up and running in two minutes flat. I had to push the button to retrigger the sample over and over, until my finger bled on to the machine." The song also uses a bassline sampled from Jimmy "Bo" Horne's song "Let Me (Let Me Be Your Lover)". Hallam told Billboard in 1993 about the lyrics, "The song "Connected" is about human beings and the lack of connection there is between anything today. It's about the way everyone tries to categorize everything. The way every race is trying to separate from each other."

== Critical reception ==
Larry Flick from Billboard magazine described the song as "an instantly insinuating hiphop/funk workout. A shuffling groove supports cool horns and a contagious chorus that is phattened by nifty femme vocal chants. In its current form, "Connected" is a sturdy precursor to an evening or a fine way to wind down into daylight." In January 1993, Flick remarked that this "mid-tempo retro-funk affair" has been making inroads with urban-minded DJs for several weeks now. Per Reinholdt Nielsen from Danish Gaffa praised the song as "a clever lesson in funk. The number is extremely simple. A great sound sampled from half a beat KC and the Sunshine Band pulls back, while Owen If whips the drums forward. Three chorus girls, rapper Rob Birch and various samples decorate the landscape, but it is the sucks of the "two rhythm groups" that lock "Connected" into the memory and body of the defenseless listener." Andrew Smith from Melody Maker complimented its "forbidding funk", "which marries a lazy, Mondays-style swagger with Curtis Mayfield-like melancholy".

The magazine also noted that the song has "more than a hint of an Andrew Weatherall-esque shuffle", and concluded, "Once you've heard the chorus a couple of times, I guarantee you will be humming it until Christmas 1993." A reviewer from Music & Media stated that it's a "sure hit", noting further that the new female vocalists are "shining over expressive rich grooves." Alan Jones from Music Week said in his review of the album, that the introductory single, "with its pulsing bass, and slick femme harmonies is fairly typical of the fare here, with what raps there are well-couched and friendly." Jim Carroll from NME called it a "chock-a-block wit jazzy flutes, chugging organs and Rob B's fine growling rap". Jonathan Bernstein from Spin remarked the song's "maximum uplift", writing, "Imagine a less lush Massive Attack and you're almost there." Victor Haseman from The Stanford Daily found that the Stereo MC's "have made stitching their patchwork quilt of Euro-electro pop, hip-hop and house their top priority, tirelessly pushing it in new directions".

== Chart performance ==
"Connected" entered the top 10 in Austria, Sweden and Switzerland and the top 20 in Belgium, Finland and the United Kingdom. In the latter country, the single peaked at number 18 during its second week on the UK Singles Chart, staying there for two weeks. Additionally, "Connected" peaked within the top 30 in France and the top 60 in the Netherlands, while on the Eurochart Hot 100, it was a top-40 hit, reaching number 36 in January 1993. On the European Dance Radio Chart, it peaked at number four in November 1992.

Outside Europe, the song reached number seven on the Canadian RPM Dance chart while peaking at number 32 on the RPM 100 Hit Tracks chart and number seven on the RPM Adult Contemporary chart. In the US, "Connected" reached number 15 on the Cash Box Top 100 while peaking at number 20 on the Billboard Hot 100. It also charted on the Billboard Maxi-Singles Sales chart, the Billboard Modern Rock Tracks chart, the Billboard Top 40/Rhythm-Crossover chart, and the Billboard Top 40/Mainstream chart. In Australia and New Zealand, the song peaked at numbers 24 and 47, respectively.

== Music video ==
The accompanying music video for "Connected" was directed by Matthew Amos. It was nominated for Best Dance Video at the 1993 MTV Video Music Awards.

== Impact and legacy ==
Melody Maker ranked "Connected" number 19 in their list of "Singles of the Year" in December 1992, naming it "the grooviest single of the year." Same month, NME ranked it number 16 in their list of "Singles of the Year". Paste ranked it number eight in their list of "25 Awesome One-Hit Wonders of the 1990s" in 2011. In 2014, the track was ranked number 322 in the German magazine Musikexpress list of the "700 Best Songs of All-Time". The Daily Telegraph ranked it number 34 in their "Top 50 Dance Songs" list in 2015. American entertainment company BuzzFeed ranked "Connected" number 82 in their list of "The 101 Greatest Dance Songs of the '90s" in 2017. ThoughtCo ranked it number 65 in their list of "The Best 100 Songs from the 1990s" list in 2018. An editor, Bill Lamb, remarked that the song "is propelled by a catchy but downbeat atmospheric brand of hip-hop."

== Track listings ==
- CD maxi – Germany, United Kingdom
1. "Connected" (edit) – 4:05
2. "Connected" (full length) – 5:16
3. "Disconnected" – 6:06
4. "Fever" – 3:15
- 7-inch single
1. "Connected" (edit) – 3:59
2. "Fever" – 3:15
- 12-inch maxi – Germany, United Kingdom
1. "Connected" (full length) – 5:12
2. "Connected" (reprise) – 1:43
3. "Disconnected" – 6:04
4. "Fever" – 3:15

== Charts ==
=== Weekly charts ===
Chart (1992–1993)	Peak position
Australia (ARIA)	47
Austria (Ö3 Austria Top 40)	5
Belgium (Ultratop 50 Flanders)	19
Canada Top Singles (RPM)	32
Canada Dance/Urban (RPM)	7
Europe (Eurochart Hot 100)	36
Europe (European Dance Radio)	4
Finland (Suomen virallinen lista)	14
France (SNEP)	27
Israel (Israeli Singles Chart)	22
Netherlands (Dutch Top 40 Tipparade)	6
Netherlands (Single Top 100)	54
New Zealand (Recorded Music NZ)	24
Sweden (Sverigetopplistan)	8
Switzerland (Schweizer Hitparade)	6
UK Singles (Official Charts)	18
UK Airplay (Music Week)	25
UK Dance (Music Week)	7
UK Club Chart (Music Week)	9
US Billboard Hot 100	20
US Maxi-Singles Sales (Billboard)	26
US Modern Rock Tracks (Billboard)	5
US Top 40/Mainstream (Billboard)	11
US Top 40/Rhythm-Crossover (Billboard)	38
US Cash Box Top 100	15

=== Year-end charts ===
Chart (1992)	Position
Sweden (Topplistan)	51

Chart (1993)	Position
Sweden (Topplistan)	95
US Modern Rock Tracks (Billboard)	30

== Certifications ==
Region	Certification	Certified units/sales
New Zealand (RMNZ)	Gold	15,000^{‡}
United Kingdom (BPI)	Silver	200,000^{‡}
^{‡} Sales+streaming figures based on certification alone.

== Release history ==
Region	Date	Format(s)	Label(s)	Ref.
United Kingdom	14 September 1992	7-inch vinyl; 12-inch vinyl; CD; cassette	4th & B'way; Gee Street	
Australia	19 October 1992	12-inch; CD; cassette	4th & B'way	

== In popular culture ==
The song appears in the movie Saving Silverman as well as Hackers. It has also been used in commercials promoting the USA Network's program Burn Notice, and by The Carphone Warehouse. It was used in the reveal trailer of the 2023 video game Crime Boss: Rockay City. The song was used by Android as music for the #GetTheMessage campaign, which was used to encourage Apple to adopt Rich Communication Services to their IPhones, and drop SMS messaging, to improve messaging across Android and iOS, and remove the infamous "Blue Bubble". The song is also used in commercials of the Bulgarian telecom operator Yettel.
