= Step It Up =

Step It Up can refer to:

- Step It Up (song)
- Step It Up 2007, U.S. global warming campaign
- "Step It Up", a song by American drag queen RuPaul featuring Dave Audé from her 2015 album Realness.
