= Elevate My Mind =

Single by Stereo MC's

from the album Supernatural
- Released: 1990
- Recorded: 1990
- Genre: Hip hop
- Length: 3:15 (7" Version) 5:07 (12" Version)
- Label: 4th & Broadway, Island Records
- Songwriter(s): Stereo MC's
- Producer(s): Stereo MC's

Stereo MC's singles chronology
"On 33" (1989)	"Elevate My Mind" (1990)	"Lost in Music" (1991)

"Elevate My Mind" is a song by English hip hop/electronic dance group Stereo MC's, with female vocals provided by Cath Coffey. It made #74 on the UK Singles Chart, #36 on the Hot Dance Music/Maxi-Singles Sales and #39 on the Billboard Hot 100, making them the first British rap group to make the Billboard Hot 100. It features a sample of "White Lines (Don't Don't Do It)" by Grandmaster Melle Mel.

== Critical reception ==
A reviewer from NME wrote, "Watch out! Here they come, back again to distress the session with another corker of a tune. A bouncy rhyming rap in true Stereo MCs fashion over a bubbling backbeat and '70s-style Hammond riff. A fine taster from their forthcoming LP."

== In popular culture ==
- "Elevate My Mind" was used on the soundtrack of Bad Company (1995) starring Laurence Fishburne, Ellen Barkin, and Frank Langella.
- The song is used in Call of Duty: Infinite Warfare, in the Zombies map Rave in the Redwoods.
