= Deep Down & Dirty =

Studio album by Stereo MC's
- Released: 28 May 2001
- Studio: Frontline Studios
- Genres: Electronic, hip hop
- Length: 50:55
- Label: Island
- Producer: Stereo MC's

Stereo MC's chronology
DJ-Kicks: Stereo MC's (2000)	Deep Down & Dirty (2001)	Retroactive (2002)

Deep Down & Dirty is the fourth studio album by the British electronic band Stereo MC's, released on 28 May 2001, nine years after the album Connected. The album maintains a similar style to its predecessor with deep-groove, beatbox funk, nods to soul-jazz and gospel though music critics at the time noted its grittier, edgier approach. The title track was released as the album's first single. It was recorded at Frontline Studios, Brixton, London.

== Background ==
The Stereo MC's toured from 1992 until 1994 in support of their previous album, Connected following the resounding success of its 1992 release which earned two coveted Brit Awards (including album of the year) before taking an extended hiatus due to being "burnt out" explained Nick "the Head" Hallam in a Billboard interview. "It got to a point where Rob and I weren't even really talking -- and this went on for about one year. This was particularly bizarre, as we've known each other since we were 6 years old." During their absence, the two formed a publishing company (Spirit Songs) and an independent label (Response Records). They also remixed U2's "Mysterious Ways" and Madonna's "Frozen" under the Ultimatum alias. In 2000 they mixed a volume of the DJ Kicks series for German imprint Studio !K7.

The first single released was the title track, Deep Down and Dirty and was issued to modern rock and college radio at the end of April. Club DJs were issued remixes of the track (by Jon Carter and Two Lone Swordsmen).

== Reception ==
Professional ratings
Aggregate scores
Source	Rating
Metacritic	68/100
Review scores
Source	Rating
AllMusic	4/5 stars
The New Zealand Herald	3/5 stars
Mojo	6/10 stars

The album was met with mixed to positive reaction from music critics, scoring 68% on Metacritic, 4 stars out of 5 on Allmusic and peaked at no 17 on the UK charts. Mojo gave it 60 out of 100 and said "If all you want to do is throw the same funky shapes you threw a decade ago, this long-awaited outing will more than suffice. Otherwise, it's the same old same old".

== Track listing ==
1. "Deep Down & Dirty" – 4:23
2. "We Belong in This World Together" – 4:40
3. "Breeze" – 4:25
4. "Running" – 4:53
5. "Graffiti Part One" – 2:34
6. "Graffiti Part Two" – 2:49
7. "Sofisticated" – 4:14
8. "Traffic" – 5:17
9. "The Right Effect" – 4:40
10. "Stop at Nothing" – 4:01
11. "Unconscious" – 4:06
12. "Shameless" – 4:53

Total running time: 50:55

== Personnel ==
Stereo MC's

- Rob Birch
- Nick Hallam
- Cath Coffey
- Vernoa Davis
- Andrea Groves
- Owen If

Additional

- Carol Kenyon – vocals
- Delance Curtis – vocals
- Angela Murrell – vocals
- Sam Scott – vocals
- The Kick Horns – flute, brass
- John Eacott – trumpet
- Malcolm Earle Smith – trombone
- Kwaku "Reg" Dzidzornu – percussion
- The Head – DJ
- Leon Mar – bass, pre-production
- Neil Douglas – engineer
- Mike Marsh – mastering
- Stereo MC's – producer

== Charts ==
Chart performance for Deep Down & Dirty
Chart (2001)	Peak position
Australian Albums (ARIA)	58
Austrian Albums (Ö3 Austria)	2
Belgian Albums (Ultratop Flanders)	35
Belgian Albums (Ultratop Wallonia)	24
Danish Albums (Hitlisten)	40
Dutch Albums (Album Top 100)	34
French Albums (SNEP)	120
German Albums (Offizielle Top 100)	10
Hungarian Albums (MAHASZ)	32
Irish Albums (IRMA)	19
Norwegian Albums (VG-lista)	22
Swedish Albums (Sverigetopplistan)	60
Swiss Albums (Schweizer Hitparade)	20
UK Albums (Official Charts)	17

== Certifications ==
Certifications for Deep Down & Dirty
Region	Certification	Certified units/sales
United Kingdom (BPI)	Silver	60,000^{^}
^{^} Shipments figures based on certification alone.
