= Step It Up (song) =

1992 single by Stereo MC's

Single by Stereo MC's

from the album Connected
- Released: 23 November 1992
- Genre: Acid jazz; funk; dance
- Length: 4:59
- Label: 4th & B'way; Gee Street
- Songwriters: Nick Hallam; Rob Birch
- Producer: Stereo MC's

Stereo MC's singles chronology
| "Connected" (1992) | "Step It Up" (1992) | "Ground Level" (1993) |

Music video
- "Step It Up" on YouTube

"Step It Up" is a song by British hip hop and electronic dance group Stereo MC's, released in November 1992 by 4th & Broadway and Gee Street Records as the second single from their third album, Connected (1992). It was written by group members Nick Hallam and Rob Birch, charting higher than both the band's previous single "Connected" and their next single "Ground Level". The single peaked at number 12 on the UK Singles Chart, number 13 in New Zealand, and number 87 in Australia. It appeared in the 1993 comedy film Wayne's World 2 and was also included on the 1996 compilation album The Beautiful Game.

== Critical reception ==
American magazine Billboard described the song as a "lively unity anthem". Billboard editor Larry Flick commented, "U.K. funketeers continue to effectively peddle their unique blend of retro-dance, traditional jazz, and hip-hop. Insinuating workout is bolstered by a smokin' trumpet solo and uplifting lyrics. Fans of the previous 'Connected' will find this gem irresistible. Actually, this anthemic jam has the juice to win the group a whole new contingent of fans. Get on it". Dave Sholin from the Gavin Report found that their unique mix of musical influences place the Stereo MC's "among the freshest sounds to come along this year", remarking that "this uptempo entry contains the magic vibe that's brought them worldwide attention". Andrew Smith from Melody Maker named it Single of the Week, "ultra-dancey" and "this year's 'Lost In Music'". He added, "You wonder where it's going to stop. Every time the Stereos return, they seem to have grown stronger, to have slam-shifted into a new, higher gear. Now 'Step It Up' finds them racing towards the summit in overdrive (and other motoring metaphors). [...] Where it was coiled like a spring, 'Step' is gregarious and free-wheeling, a monstrous work-out that grinds and shakes its way to a heart-stopping climax."

Blake Baxter from Music Week's RM Dance Update wrote, "This has a great texture, weaving a mood for realists and sequenced bass fanatics. Hooky vocals and funky drum tracks spiced up with hot horn make this soulful but still unique". A reviever from NME found it "less addicive" and "kind of like Happy Mondays would sound if they attempted an upwardly mobile career shift". Peter Stanton from Smash Hits gave "Step It Up" a score of four out of five, adding, "Thumping basslines, a dash of trumpets and a groove that could get the local old people's home boogeyin' till the dawn". Jonathan Bernstein from Spin remarked that "lacerating hooks abound" on the track, describing it as "nagging".

== Track listings ==
- 7-inch vinyl

A: "Step It Up" (radio edit)
B: "Step It Up" (Ultimatum Trumpet mix)

- UK 12-inch vinyl

A1: "Step It Up" (extended mix)
A2: "Step It Up" (Ultimatum Trumpet mix)
A3: "Step It Up" (Ultimatum remix)
B1: "Step It Up" (Stereo Field dub)
B2: "Step It Up" (Stereo Field instrumental dub)

- US 12-inch vinyl

A1: "Step It Up" (Ultimatum remix)
A2: "Step It Up" (Ultimatum Trumpet mix)
B1: "Step It Up" (Stereo Field dub)
B2: "Step It Up" (album version)

== Charts ==
=== Weekly charts ===
Weekly chart performance for "Step It Up"
| Chart (1992–1994) | Peak position |
|---|---|
| Australia (ARIA) | 87 |
| Austria (Ö3 Austria Top 40) | 12 |
| Belgium (Ultratop 50 Flanders) | 29 |
| Canada Top Singles (RPM) | 19 |
| Canada Dance/Urban (RPM) | 3 |
| Europe (Eurochart Hot 100) | 44 |
| Europe (European Dance Radio) | 3 |
| Europe (European Hit Radio) | 20 |
| France (SNEP) | 50 |
| Greece (Pop + Rock) | 5 |
| Iceland (Íslenski Listinn Topp 40) | 5 |
| Israel (Israeli Singles Chart) | 12 |
| New Zealand (Recorded Music NZ) | 13 |
| Sweden (Sverigetopplistan) | 8 |
| UK Singles (OCC) | 12 |
| UK Airplay (Music Week) | 10 |
| UK Dance (Music Week) | 6 |
| UK Club Chart (Music Week) | 3 |
| US Billboard Hot 100 | 58 |
| US Dance Club Play (Billboard) | 25 |
| US Maxi-Singles Sales (Billboard) | 20 |
| US Modern Rock Tracks (Billboard) | 16 |
| US Top 40/Mainstream (Billboard) | 30 |
| US Cash Box Top 100 | 56 |

=== Year-end charts ===
Year-end chart performance for "Step It Up"
| Chart (1992-1994) | Position |
|---|---|
| Brazil (Mais Tocadas) | 73 |
| Canada Dance/Urban (RPM) | 25 |
| Iceland (Íslenski Listinn Topp 40) | 89 |
| Sweden (Topplistan) | 70 |
| UK Club Chart (Music Week) | 34 |

== Release history ==
Release dates and formats for "Step It Up"
| Region | Date | Format(s) | Label(s) | Ref. |
|---|---|---|---|---|
| United Kingdom | 23 November 1992 | 7-inch vinyl; 12-inch vinyl; CD; cassette | 4th & B'way; Gee Street | |
| Australia | 21 March 1993 | 12-inch vinyl; CD; cassette | 4th & B'way; Gee Street | |
