= 33-45-78 =

Studio album by Stereo MC's
- Released: 1989
- Genre: Electronic, hip hop
- Label: Gee Street
- Producer: Stereo MC's

Stereo MC's chronology
33-45-78 (1989)	Supernatural (1990)

33-45-78 is the 1989 debut album by the Stereo MC's. It was recorded on a shoestring budget with DJ Cesare as drummer and Cath Coffey as backing vocalist. Billboard declared that 33-45-78 proved the band "capable of wildly imaginative sampling". Songstuff reviewers called the album "a labour of love that involved hand-making drum loops in the most rudimentary of studios" and while admitting that the sound was raw, noted that its originality was enough that it drew attention from the Jungle Brothers who would later feature on the band's more polished second album, Supernatural.

The title "33-45-78" refers to the three common RPM speed settings on a player of gramophone records.

== Track listing ==
1. "On 33" (5:12)
2. "Use It" (4:09)
3. "Gee Street" (4:24)
4. "Neighbourhood" (4:22)
5. "Toe to Toe" (4:46)
6. "What Is Soul?" (4:48)
7. "Part 2" (4:29)
8. "Bring It On" (4:39)
9. "Out of Touch" (4:16)
10. "Sunday 19th March" (4:16)
11. "This Ain't a Love Song" (4:44)
12. "Ancient Concept" (1:33)
13. "On the Mike" (4:54)
14. "Move" (3:54)
15. "Back to the Future" (6:04)
