= DJ-Kicks: Stereo MC's =

Compilation album by Stereo MC's
- Released: 27 March 2000
- Genre: Electronica
- Length: 65:40
- Label: Studio !K7 !K7082CD - CD !K7082LP - LP
- Producer: Stereo MC's

Stereo MC's chronology
Connected (1992)	DJ-Kicks: Stereo MC's (2000)	Deep Down & Dirty (2001)

DJ-Kicks chronology
Kid Loco (1999)	Stereo MC's (2000)	Nightmares on Wax (2000)

Professional ratings
Review scores
Source	Rating
Allmusic	4/5 stars

DJ-Kicks: Stereo MC's is a DJ mix album, mixed by Stereo MC's. It was released on 27 March 2000 on the Studio !K7 independent record label as part of the DJ-Kicks series.

== Track listing ==
1. "Moon Trek" - The Mike Theodore Orchestra – 3:03
2. "Back to the Hip Hop" (instrumental) - The Troubleneck Brothers – 2:02
3. "Solid Feet" - Kitty Bronx – 4:13
4. "Ibuki Reconstruction" - Kodo – 4:06
5. "Road to the Riches" - Kool G Rap & DJ Polo – 2:30
6. "Tell Me Why" (Revised by Soul Circuit) - Freakniks – 1:52
7. "Poppa Large" - Ultramagnetic MCs – 1:28
8. "Do It, Do It" - Disco Four – 2:35
9. "Beans & Rice" - Sofa Surfers – 4:07
10. "Tongue of Labyrinth" - Divine Styler – 0:51
11. "Roller Rinks and Chicks" - Freddy Fresh – 1:00
12. "From the Ground Up" (A cappella) - The Associates – 1:36
13. "Slight of Hand" - Oil – 3:26
14. "Rhino Part II" - Stereo MC's – 4:49
15. "Pharaoh Intellect" - The 57th Dynasty – 3:23
16. "Flameout" - 101 Strings – 2:31
17. "Theme from Control Centre" (Reprise) - The Herbaliser – 2:43
18. "Hypnotize" - Mark Stewart – 0:19
19. "Latazz" - The Funky Lowlives – 2:25
20. "At the Helm" - Hieroglyphics – 2:36
21. "Rhino Part III" - Stereo MC's – 3:17
22. "Seeing Red" - Red Snapper – 3:51
23. "Rhino Part I" - Stereo MC's – 4:11
24. "Front Line Football" - Frontline – 1:05
25. "Cash Flow" - Scaramanga – 1:41
