= Paper Chasers =

- DVD cover
- Directed by: Maxie Collier
- Written by: Maxie Collier
- Produced by: Holly Becker; Maxie Collier; Yvette Plummer
- Starring: Maxie Collier; Chuck Brown; Corey Brown; James Brown; Greg Carter; Damon Dash; Chuck D Chivon Dean; Hans Dobson; Flavor Flav; Fat Joe; Ludacris; Nivea; Prince Paul; Master P. Chris Robinson; Russell Simmons; Sway Calloway
- Cinematography: Eric McClain
- Edited by: Maxie Collier; Davey Frankel; Ethan Lader; Brad Mays
- Music by: Angel Red; Charlie "Parker" Bucknall
- Distributed by: Independent Film Channel; Koch/E1
- Release date: May 7, 2003 (Tribeca Film Festival)
- Running time: 87 minutes
- Country: United States
- Language: English

Paper Chasers is a 2003 American independent documentary film produced by Holly Becker and Yvette Plummer, and directed by Maxie Collier.

== Synopsis ==
Paper Chasers is a depiction of the far-flung Hip hop scene, featuring such well-known artists as James Brown, Chuck D., Flavor Flav, Master P., Chris Bridges, and Russell Simmons. The title of the film it is derived from hip-hop terminology for an individual who is pursuing a lucrative goal or career, where paper money would be the reward for great effort. Director Maxie Collier and his crew traveled the United States in pursuit of musical paper chasers - music, art and fashion entrepreneurs both famous and unknown - and were lucky enough to chart the rise of hip hop superstar Ludacris. The film, which contains the original music score and title theme song "Paper Chase" by writer/composer Angel Red, granddaughter of Master alto saxophonist and orchestra leader, Johnny Hodges. Along with the London-based music producer Charlie "Parker" Bucknall (57th Dynasty), had its world premiere at the 2003 Tribeca Film Festival, and was subsequently released on DVD in 2005 by Koch Home Video Entertainment One and then broadcast numerous times on the Independent Film Channel (IFC).

Between 1999 and 2008, Collier conducted more than 200 interviews with entrepreneurs, artists, and executives across the country. In 2012, he launched Paper Chasers TV to share these archive and prepare for the 10 year anniversary film Paper Chasers 2.
