= Lost in Music (Stereo MC's song) =

Single by Stereo MCs

from the album Supernatural
- Released: 1991
- Genre: Electronic; house
- Length: 3:34 (USA edit); 4:46 (album version)
- Songwriters: Nick Hallam; Rob Birch
- Producer: Stereo MCs

Stereo MCs singles chronology
"Elevate My Mind" (1990)	"Lost in Music" (1991)	"Connected" (1992)

"Lost in Music" is a song by English hip hop/electronic dance group Stereo MCs, released in 1991 as the second single from their second album, Supernatural (1990). The song is written by group members Nick Hallam and Rob Birch, and spent a week at number one on the US Billboard Hot Dance Club chart. It also peaked at number 46 on the UK Singles Chart.

== Critical reception ==
Larry Flick from Billboard magazine wrote, "Stereo MC's drop some dope (and topical) rhymes on the funk-line hip-hopper 'Lost in Music'. Remixes by Ultimatum maintain the streetwise vibe of the album version while adding proper club-viable nuances. Love the Hammond organ fills and wriggling bass. Get "lost"." Andrew Smith from Melody Maker commented, "Call me a cynic, but sometimes when I listen to Stereo MCs, I still can't believe that Britain could be capable of producing rap music this good. [...] It lopes and lilts along with the easy grace of a cat toying with its prey, full of little rhythmic twists and melodic flourishes. If you're looking for comparisons, the Jungle Brothers and De La Soul are good places to start, but that only tells part of the story." James Hamilton from Music Week described the song as "Jagger-cum-ragga style drawled catchy rumblingly chugging pop rap."

=== Charts ===
Chart (1991)	Peak position
UK Singles (OCC)	46
UK Dance (Music Week)	12
US Hot Dance Club Play (Billboard)	1
