= Lambeth Country Show =

Annual festival in London, England

Coordinates: 51°27′7.66″N 0°6′26.78″W

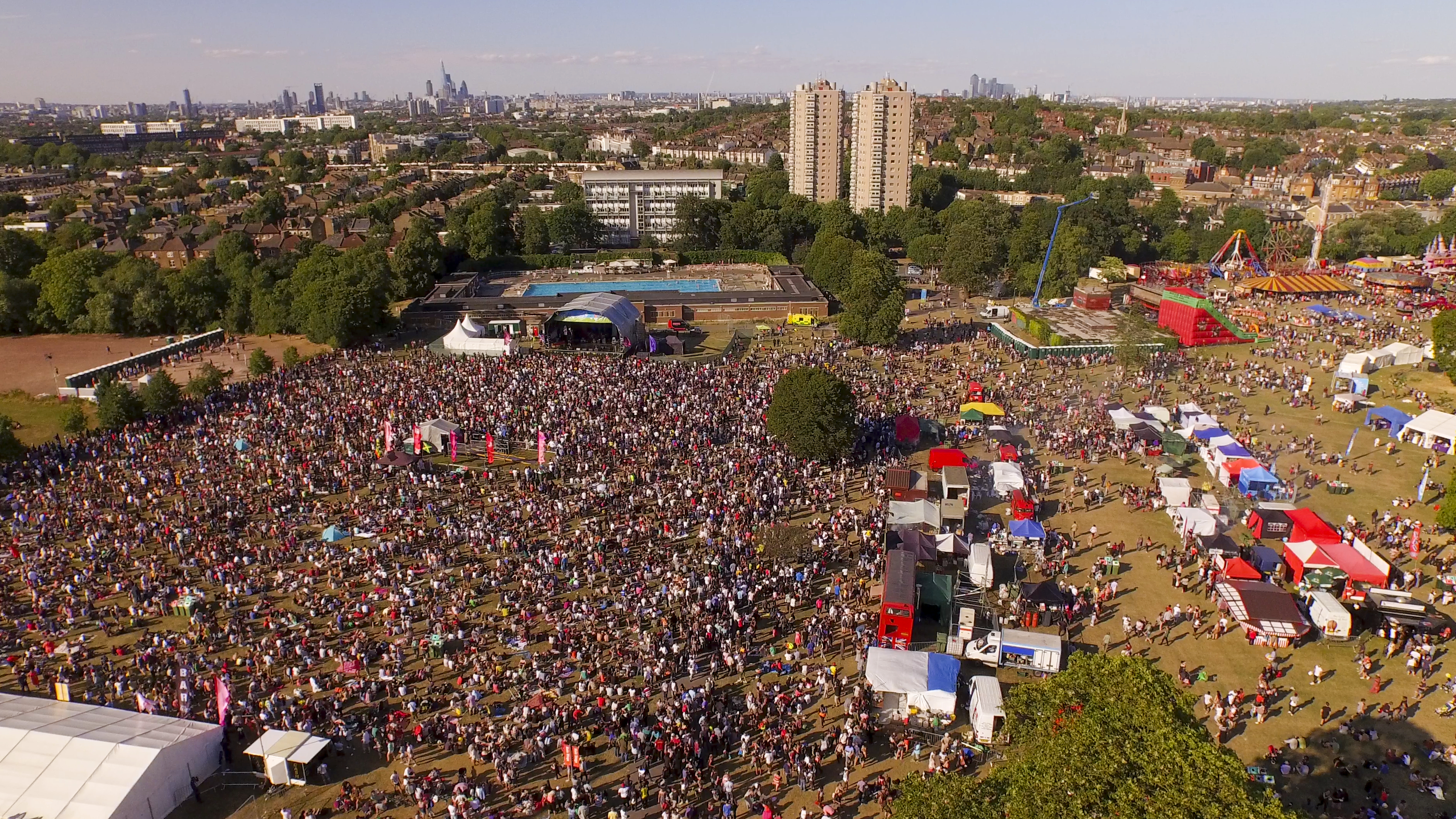
- Aerial view of the main stage and field 2015
- Frequency: Annual
- Locations: Lambeth, England
- Years active: 1974-
- Founders: Lambeth Council
- Most recent: 7 June 2025 – 8 June 2025
- Next event: tbc
- Attendance: 120,000
- Website: https://www.lambethcountryshow.co.uk/

The Lambeth Country Show is a free festival that takes place annually in Brockwell Park in Lambeth, South London.

The show was first founded as the annual Brockwell Park Flower Show in 1967. This was organised by the Lambeth Horticultural Society (LHS) and the Lambeth Arts & Recreation Association (LARA). Lambeth Council took over the management of the event in 1974 and developed it into what is today's show.

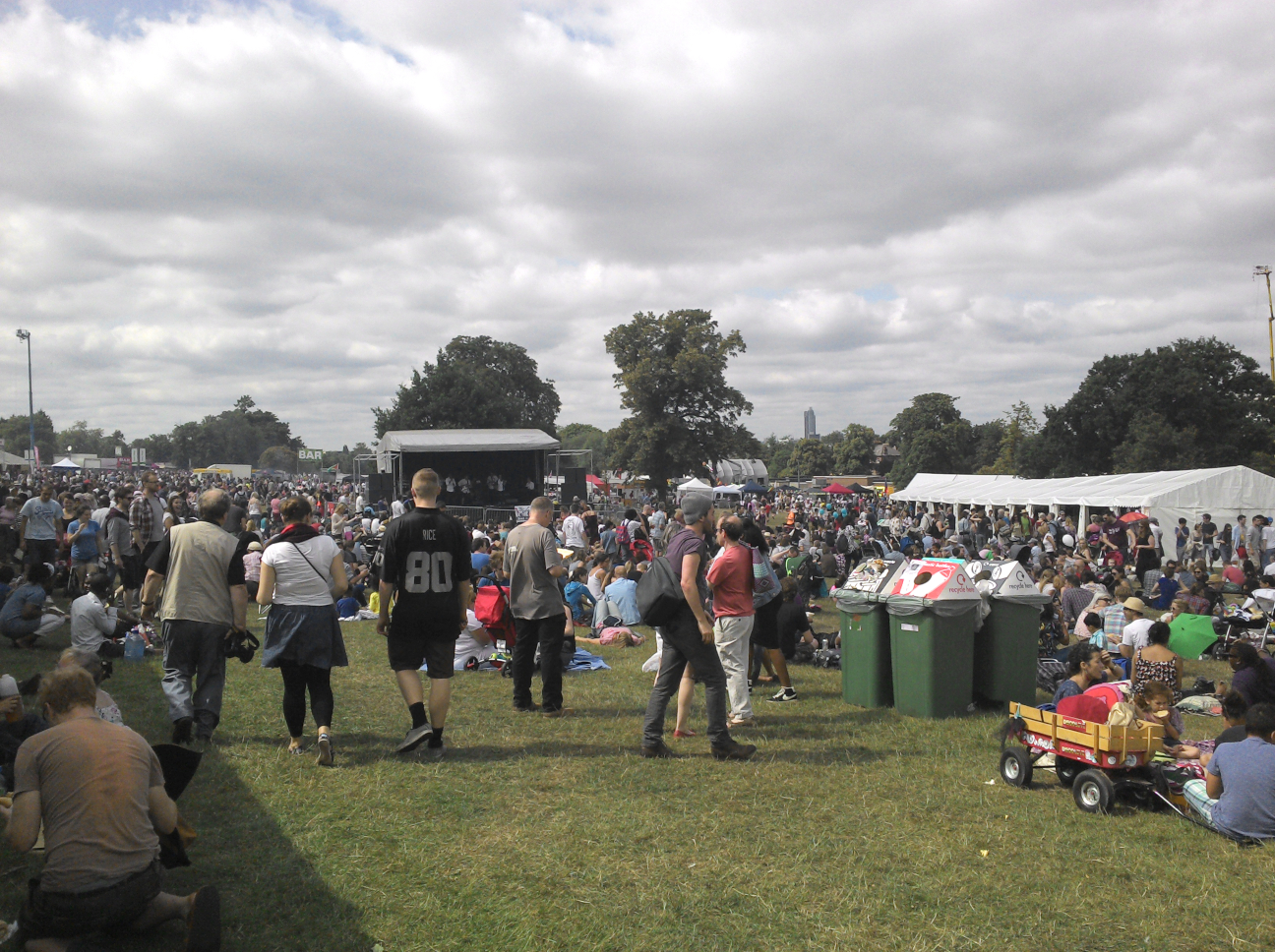
Lambeth Country Show, 2013

The festival hosts animal and livestock displays (courtesy of Vauxhall City Farm), agricultural demonstrations (in the past this has included steam traction engines), craft displays (including a popular vegetable sculpture competition), live music performances (with Sunday designated for roots reggae), local community and charity groups, food and stalls, a funfair, and an educational entertainment program for children.

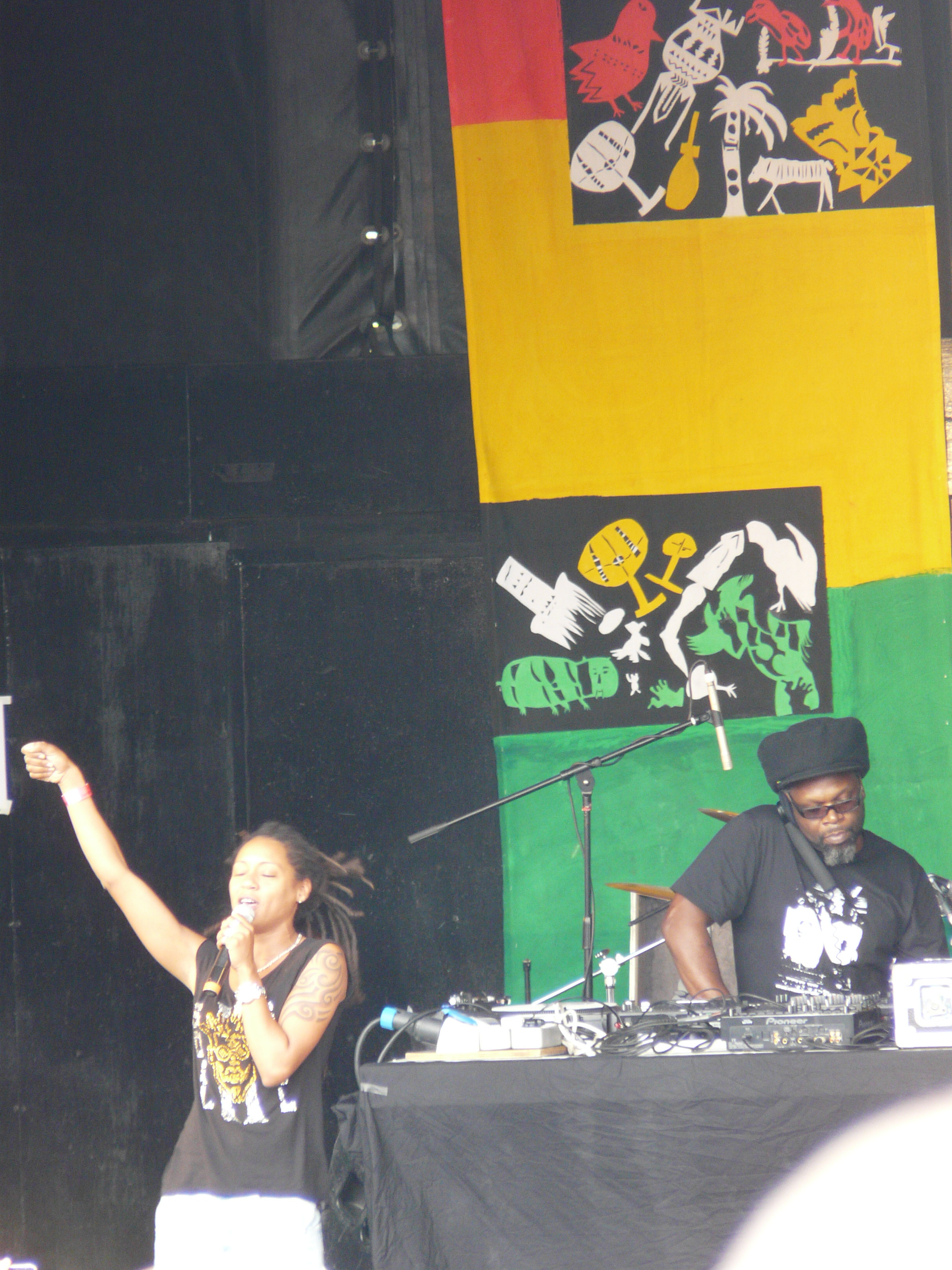
Soul II Soul at the 2010 show

Acts and artists to have played the main stage at the show have included Mad Professor, Saxon Sound, Alabama 3, Soul II Soul, Horace Andy, Twinkle Brothers, General Levy, Luciano, Loose Ends, Aswad, Max Romeo, Alison Limerick, Incognito, and Johnny Clarke.

The 2012 show was originally cancelled, and then postponed to September, to avoid clashing with the London Olympics.

In 2018, the council courted controversy by announcing that the previously open festival would be enclosed by a perimeter fence along with full bag searches and increased security.

The show has historically been held on the third weekend in July, but since 2023 moved to the second week of June as Lambeth Council handed over management of the show to a private events company as part of the Brockwell Live series of festivals held in the park.

The show celebrated its 50th anniversary in June 2024.

Citing budget pressures, the 2026 show has been cancelled. Its not known as yet whether it will return in 2027.
