= Ace and Vis =

Radio DJs and television presenters from London

Ace and Vis, also known as The Troublemakers of Radio, are radio DJs and television presenters from south-east London. They met whilst studying at the BRIT School in London.

== Career ==
Known as Ace and Invisible (Vis), after winning a gold Sony Radio Academy Award for their lunchtime show on BBC Radio 1Xtra in 2004, playing garage and hip-hop. The two later co-presented BBC Radio 1Xtra's drivetime show from 4 to 7 pm on weekdays, before moving to the 4 to 7 pm weekend slot. They left BBC Radio 1Xtra in September 2012. They also co-presented a show on the UK music channel Channel U (then Channel AKA, now Now 70s).

During their run on 1Xtra, the two presenters flipped pancakes in the street, attempted to fry eggs on the pavement, and interviewed Jimmy Savile (before he was discredited posthumously) and former 1980s WWE wrestling stars. Guests on their show included musicians and artists such as Chamillionaire, Ne-Yo and Missy Elliott.

They also travelled to Japan, Germany and Ayia Napa, and were on the International Summer Tour '06 with TwiceasNice as part of their resident team of DJs.

Ace and Vis worked closely with BBC Blast, often appearing at tour events to give young people an insight into working in radio.

== Vis solo career ==
After leaving the BBC, Duane Jones (Vis) founded Renowned Group in 2013 with Wretch 32. The aim was to set up a company that would manage and publish an array of British talent, with clients such as Jacob Banks, KZ, Knox Brown and of course Wretch 32.

By the end of 2013, Duane set up the last piece of the Renowned Group property, founding independent production company Renowned Films with two talented producer directors Tim Withers and Max Welch. Renowned Films soon bagged its first commission for Trace Sports on Sky, a 12 part series called Winners' Circle that was shown in 66 territories featuring sportspeople and athletes across Europe. Soon after came Football Freestyle for London Live.

In 2015, the indie caught the attention of David Abraham, the Chief Executive of Channel 4, and Jay Hunt, the channel's Chief Creative Officer. Channel 4 took on an equity stake in Renowned Films. Shortly after, a commission from ITV came in the form of Pranksterz, a prank show playing on cultural stereotypes. This was followed by The Women Who Kill Lions about female hunting and Top Dad with Ashley Walters, both for Channel 4. Subsequently, the company produced NYPD: Biggest Gang in New York? an investigative piece about police brutality for both BBC Three and BBC Two, as well as Hate and Pride of Orlando about the Orlando gay club shootings for BBC Three.

== Ace solo career ==
Ace returned to Radio 1Xtra in 2014 to cover various weekend programmes. In May 2015 Ace officially re-joined 1Xtra to present weekend breakfast from 6 to 10 am. Following Trevor Nelson's move to weekend afternoons in January 2016, Ace became the new host of 1Xtra's Live Lounge - weekdays 10 am – 1 pm. He left the station in 2024 and now works for Kiss and Kisstory R&B. In October 2024 he was given the Freedom of the City of London.
