= Supernatural (Stereo MC's album) =

Studio album by Stereo MC's
- Released: 1990
- Recorded: Calliope Studios, New York City; Terminal 24 Studios, Elephant and Castle; Lavender Hill, Battersea
- Genre: Electronic, hip hop
- Length: 49:42 (US)
- Label: Island
- Producer: Stereo MC's

Stereo MC's chronology
33-45-78 (1989)	Supernatural (1990)	Connected (1992)

Professional ratings
Review scores
Source	Rating
AllMusic	4/5 stars
Calgary Herald	B−
NME	7/10
Record Mirror	4/5
The Rolling Stone Album Guide	3.5/5 stars
Select	5/5

Supernatural is the second album by Stereo MC's, released in 1990. The US release is subtitled "American Mix" and has a different track list. In 1996, Mixmag ranked the album at number 46 in its list of the "Best Dance Albums of All Time".

== Track listing ==
All songs written by Robert Birch (Rob B)/Nicholas Hallam (The Head), except as noted

1. "I'm a Believer" (4:35)
2. "Scene of the Crime" (4:04)
3. "Declaration" (3:08)
4. "Elevate My Mind" (3:24) (Note: This song made the Stereo MCs the first British rap-based single to make the Billboard Hot 100.)
5. "What'cha Gonna Do" (R. Birch/N. Hallam/P. Hall) (3:55)
6. "Two Horse Town" (5:10)
7. "Ain't Got Nobody" (4:43) (Note: Its hook is based loosely on Sly and the Family Stone's "I Ain't Got Nobody (For Real)" not on the jazz classic "I Ain't Got Nobody".)
8. "Goin' Back to the Wild" (R. Birch/N. Hallam/P. Hall) (4:31)
9. "Lost in Music" (4:34)
10. "Life on the Line" (3:57)
11. "The Other Side" (4:42)
12. "Set Me Loose" (3:29)
13. "What's the Word" (3:39)
14. "Early One Morning" (3:45)
15. "Smokin' with the Motherman" (7:50)
16. "Relentless" (4:44)

=== American Mix ===
1. "I'm a Believer" (4:35)
2. "Scene of the Crime" (4:04)
3. "Declaration" (2:55)
4. "Elevate My Mind" (3:19)
5. "Two Horse Town" (5:11)
6. "Ain't Got Nobody" (4:38)
7. "Goin' Back to the Wild" (Birch, Hallam, Hall) (4:31)
8. "Lost in Music" (Ultimatum Remix) (4:34)
9. "The Other Side" (4:42)
10. "Set Me Loose" (3:29)
11. "What's the Word" (3:39)
12. "Early One Morning" (3:43)

== Charts ==
Chart (1991)	Peak position
Australian Albums (ARIA)	132

== Notes ==
Cover art by Sean Phillips
