= Stereo MC's =

English hip hop music group

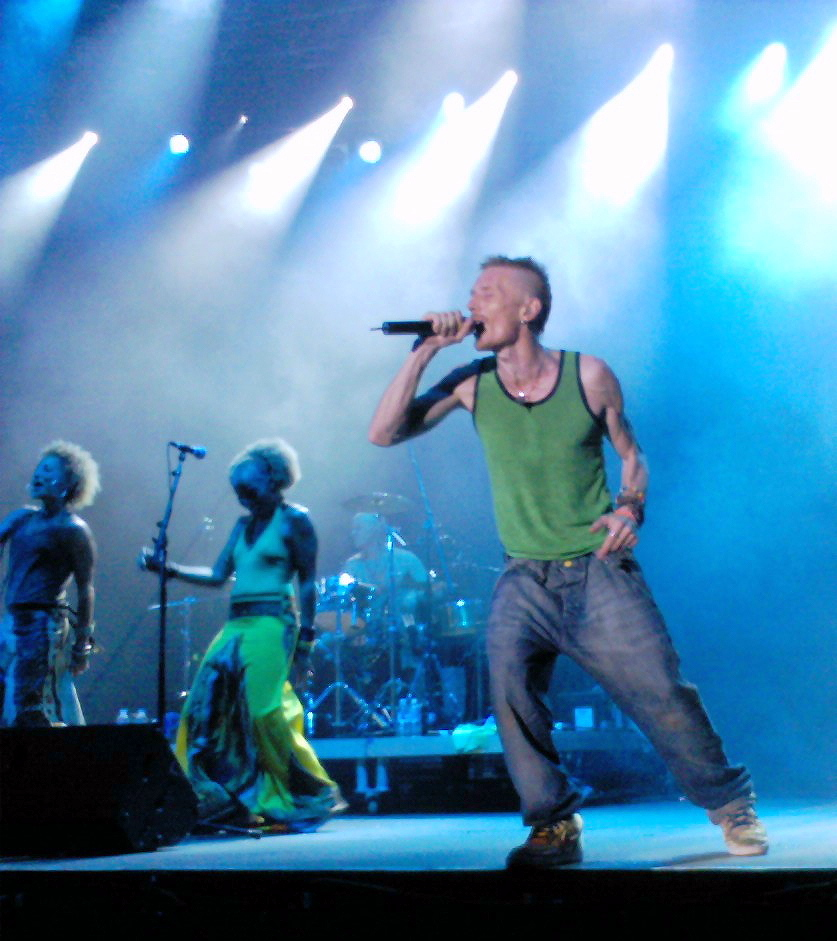
- Stereo MC's in concert, August 2006

Background information
- Origin: Nottingham, England
- Genres: Hip-hop; electronic; alternative hip-hop; house; alternative dance; hip house
- Years active: 1985–present
- Labels: 4th & Broadway; Gee Street; Island; Graffiti Recording; Rhino; Connected
- Members: Nick Hallam; Rob Birch; Cath Coffey; Tansay Omar
- Past members: Owen If
- Website: Official website

Stereo MC's are an English hip-hop and electronic dance group that formed in Clapham, London, in 1985. They had an international top 20 hit with their single "Connected" and a UK top 20 hit with "Step It Up". After releasing eight albums for Island Records, !K7, Graffiti Recordings, and PIAS, they formed the label Connected with the band Terranova to release their own material and that of other artists within the house/techno/electronic genre.

== Career ==
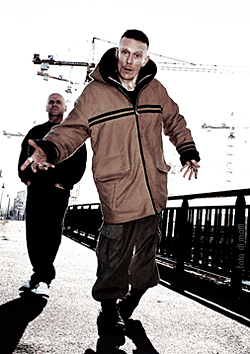
Stereo MC's 2005 in Berlin

Rob Birch (vocalist/songwriter) and Nick Hallam (DJ/producer) co-founded the Gee Street recording studio and record label, in 1985 along with Jon Baker and DJ Richie Rich. Part of the finance came from Birch and Hallam's joint receipt of £14,000 from a property developer, on condition they vacated their adjacent flats.

When Gee Street attracted the attention of 4th & Broadway, they recorded the debut Stereo MCs' studio album, 33-45-78 (1989), on a shoestring budget with DJ Cesare. Drummer Owen If and backing vocalist Cath Coffey joined the group for the Supernatural LP. In 1990, "Elevate My Mind" was the first British hip hop single to reach the US Billboard R&B chart. Having supported the Happy Mondays on a US tour, in the emerging UK alternative dance scene, it took an alliance with the Jungle Brothers to ensure chart success for Supernatural (1990). Remix work for U2 and Queen Latifah followed.

Their live band included singers Andrea Bedassie and Verona Davis, and they were one of the few hip hop outfits to play at rock music festivals at the time. 1992's mainstream breakthrough Connected, a number 2 success in the UK Albums Chart, contained the hit singles "Connected", "Step It Up", "Creation", and "Ground Level", and won them 1994 Brit Awards for Best Group and Best Album. Hallam and Birch then created the music-publishing firm Spirit Songs, which signed Finley Quaye.

The follow-up to Connected did not appear for almost a decade. Further remix duties for Madonna ("Frozen"), Tricky ("Makes Me Wanna Die" Weekend Mix), and the Jungle Brothers ("Jungle Brother") in 1998 kept the Stereo MCs' name in the limelight. Madonna went on to use the "Frozen" remix on her 2001 Drowned World Tour.

In 2000, they released a Disc Jockey mix for Studio !K7's DJ-Kicks series and remixed another song for Madonna ("Music"). The following year saw the release of Deep Down & Dirty, followed by a tour including slots opening for the recently reunited Jane's Addiction.

Their sixth studio album, Double Bubble, was released in July 2008, followed by their seventh, Emperor's Nightingale, in August 2011. In December 2008, they supported Madness at the O2 Arena in London.

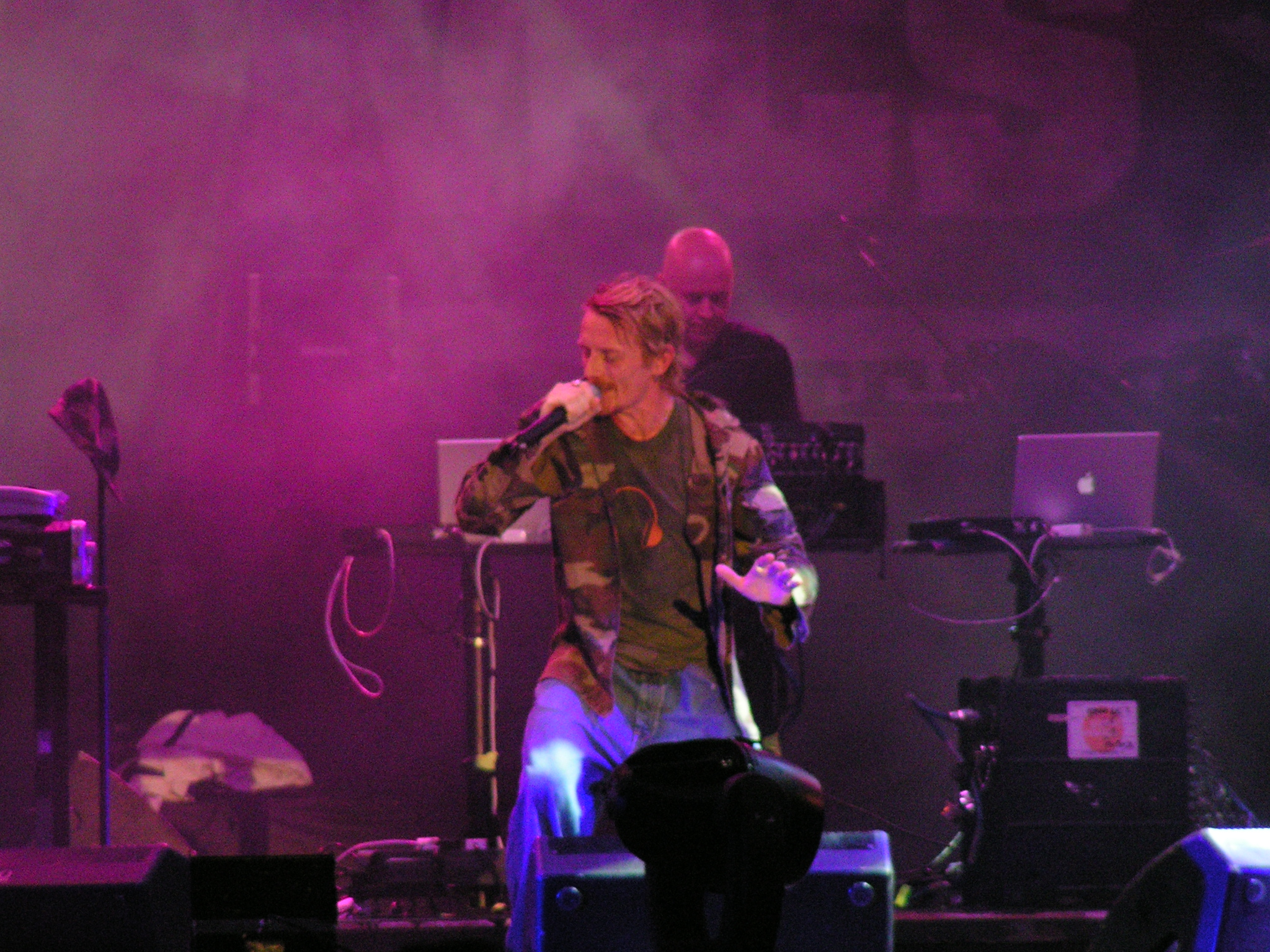
Stereo MC's at the Orange Music Experience Festival, Haifa, 29 June 2005

Drummer Owen If died on 10 July 2022, at the age of 63.

== Members ==
- Nick Hallam – born 11 June 1960, Nottingham, England.
- 'Rob B' – born Robert Charles Birch, 11 June 1961, Ruddington, Nottinghamshire, England.
- 'Owen If' – born Ian Frederick Rossiter, 20 March 1959, Newport, Monmouthshire, Wales – died 10 July 2022, Newport, Wales.
- Cath Coffey – born Catherine Muthomi Coffey, c. 1965, Eldoret, Kenya.

== Discography ==
=== Studio albums ===
List of albums, with selected chart positions
Title	Album details	Peak chart positions							Certification
Title	Album details	UK	AUS	AUT	GER	NZ	SWE	SWI	Certification
33-45-78	Released: 1989; Label: Gee Street	—	—	—	—	—	—	—	
Supernatural	Released: 1990; Label: Island	—	132	—	—	—	—	—	
Connected	Released: 1992; Label: Fourth & Broadway	2	86	12	47	33	17	19	BPI: Platinum
Deep Down & Dirty	Released: 2001; Label: Island	17	58	2	10	—	60	20	BPI: Silver
Paradise	Released: 2005	—	—	—	—	—	—	—	
Double Bubble	Released: 2008	—	—	—	—	—	—	—	
Emperor's Nightingale	Released: 2011	—	—	—	—	—	—	—	

=== Compilation albums ===
- Retroactive (2002)
- Live at the BBC (2008)

=== Other albums ===
- DJ-Kicks: Stereo MC's (2000) (Remix album of other artists)

=== Singles ===
List of singles, with selected chart positions
Year	Title	Peak chart positions										Album
Year	Title	UK	AUS	AUT	BEL (FL)	FRA	NED	NZ	SWE	SWI	US	Album
1988	"Move It" (with DJ Cesare)	—	—	—	—	—	—	—	—	—	—	Single only
1988	"What is Soul?"	—	—	—	—	—	—	—	—	—	—	33-45-78
1989	"On 33"	94	—	—	—	—	—	—	—	—	—	33-45-78
1989	"Lyrical Machine"	—	—	—	—	—	—	—	—	—	—	Single only
1990	"Elevate My Mind"	74	154	—	—	—	—	—	—	—	39	Supernatural
1991	"Lost in Music"	46	—	—	—	—	20	—	—	—	—	Supernatural
1991	"I'm a Believer" (Continental Europe only)	—	—	—	—	—	—	—	—	—	—	Supernatural
1992	"Connected"	18	47	5	19	27	54	24	8	6	20	Connected
1992	"Step It Up"	12	87	12	29	50	—	13	8	—	58	Connected
1993	"Ground Level"	19	—	—	—	—	—	—	—	—	—	Connected
1993	"Creation"	19	—	—	—	—	—	—	—	—	—	Connected
2001	"Deep Down & Dirty"	17	115	—	—	—	98	—	—	97	—	Deep Down & Dirty
2001	"We Belong in This World Together"	59	—	—	—	—	—	—	—	—	—	Deep Down & Dirty
2002	"Running"	81	—	—	—	—	—	—	—	—	—	Deep Down & Dirty
2005	"Warhead"	—	—	—	—	—	—	—	—	—	—	Paradise
2005	"Paradise"	—	—	—	—	—	—	—	—	—	—	Paradise
2005	"Set It Off"	—	—	—	—	—	—	—	—	—	—	Paradise
2008	"Black Gold"	—	—	—	—	—	—	—	—	—	—	Double Bubble
2011	"Boy" (featuring Jamie Cullum)	—	—	—	—	—	—	—	—	—	—	Emperor's Nightingale
"—" denotes single that did not chart or was not released.

== See also ==
- Timeline of Billboard number-one dance songs
- List of artists who reached number one on the U.S. Dance Club Songs chart
