= Connected (Stereo MC's album) =

Studio album by Stereo MC's
- Released: 5 October 1992
- Genres: Acid jazz, alternative hip hop, alternative dance, trip hop
- Length: 56:10
- Labels: Gee Street/Island; 512 743
- Producer: Stereo MC's

Stereo MC's chronology
Supernatural (1990)	Connected (1992)	DJ Kicks (2000)

Singles from Connected
- 1. "Connected" Released: 14 September 1992; 2. "Step It Up" Released: 23 November 1992; 3. "Ground Level" Released: 8 February 1993; 4. "Creation" Released: 17 May 1993

Connected is the third studio album by Stereo MC's. The tracks "Connected", "Ground Level", "Step It Up" and "Creation" became hit singles.

== Critical reception ==
Professional ratings
Review scores
Source	Rating
AllMusic	4.5/5 stars
Calgary Herald	B+
Chicago Tribune	2.5/4 stars
Encyclopedia of Popular Music	4/5 stars
The Rolling Stone Album Guide	3.5/5 stars
Select	5/5
The Village Voice	B−

In a contemporary review, James Muretich from Calgary Herald said that "the hour-long program does wear a wee thin but, hey, while the groove-mood lasts, it`s a blast". Music critic Robert Christgau for The Village Voice, wrote that, although its music is amiable and rhythmic, Connected is also "so multifaceted that its functionality is fungible and forgettable." In June 2000, Q placed Connected as #52 in its list of the 100 Greatest British Albums Ever. The album won Best British Album at the 1994 Brit Awards, was shortlisted for the 1993 Mercury Prize, and included in the book 1001 Albums You Must Hear Before You Die.

== Track listing ==
All songs written by Robert Birch (Rob B)/Nicholas Hallam (The Head), except where noted

1. "Connected" (Birch/Hallam/H.W. Casey/Richard Finch) – 5:14
  - Contains a sample from "Let Me (Let Me Be Your Lover)" by Jimmy "Bo" Horne.
2. "Ground Level" – 4:13
3. "Everything" (Birch/Hallam/James L. Worthy) – 3:47
4. "Sketch" (Birch/Hallam/Tuzé DeAbreu) – 5:44
  - Contains a sample of "Passarinho" by Gal Costa.
5. "Fade Away" – 4:25
6. "All Night Long" – 4:07
7. "Step It Up" – 4:59
8. "Playing With Fire" – 4:20
  - Uses the piano progression from the introduction to Monkey Man on Let it Bleed by the Rolling Stones
  - Contains a sample of "Opportunities (Let's Make Lots of Money)" by Pet Shop Boys.
9. "Pressure" – 3:50
10. "Chicken Shake" – 3:50
11. "Creation" – 5:03
12. "Don't Let Up" (feat. Mica Paris) – 3:09
13. "The End" (Birch/Hallum/Carole King/Toni Stern) – 3:47

== Personnel ==
=== Stereo MCs ===
- Robert Charles "Rob B." Birch – vocals
- Nick "The Head" Hallam – DJ
- Ian Frederick "Owen If" Rossiter – drums, percussion
- Cath Coffey – backing vocals

=== Additional personnel ===
- James Hallawell – keyboards, organ
- Paul O. Kane, Matthew Seligman – bass guitar
- Chicu Modu – saxophone
- Ivan Hussey, Johnny T., Anya Ulman, Laura Cochrane – strings
- Kick Horns – brass

== Singles ==
- "Connected" (#18 in the United Kingdom, 14 September 1992)
- "Step It Up" (#12 in the United Kingdom, 23 November 1992)
- "Ground Level" (#19 in the United Kingdom, 8 February 1993)
- "Creation" (#19 in United Kingdom, 17 May 1993)

== Charts ==
Chart performance for Connected
Chart (1992–1993)	Peak position
Australian Albums (ARIA)	86
Austrian Albums (Ö3 Austria)	12
German Albums (Offizielle Top 100)	47
New Zealand Albums (RMNZ)	33
Swedish Albums (Sverigetopplistan)	17
Swiss Albums (Schweizer Hitparade)	19
UK Albums (Official Charts)	2

Chart (2026)	Peak position
Greek Albums (IFPI)	57

== Certifications and sales ==
Certifications and sales for Connected
Region	Certification	Certified units/sales
United Kingdom (BPI)	Platinum	420,000
