= The Knocks 1992–2000 =

Greatest hits album by Jay Tee
- Released: February 13, 2001
- Recorded: 1992–2000; Alleyway Studios (Vallejo, CA); Batchelor's Pad (Corona, CA); The Grill (Oakland, CA); K-Lou Studios (Richmond, CA); Pound 4 Pound (Delano, CA); Rated Z Studios (Vallejo, CA)
- Genres: West Coast hip-hop, gangsta rap
- Length: 72:35
- Label: 40 Ounce Records
- Producers: Dave Fore, Jay Tee (exec.), Johnny Z, Ken Franklin, Lev Berlak, Philly Blunt, Terrance Richardson

Jay Tee chronology
| Velvet City (2000) | The Knocks 1992–2000 (2001) | So Cold (2001) |

The Knocks 1992–2000 is a greatest hits compilation by American rapper Jay Tee. It was released February 13, 2001 on Jay Tee's own label, 40 Ounce Records. The songs are culled from the N2Deep and Latino Velvet music catalogs. Two of the songs, "California Hot Tubs" and "What You Do", were newly remixed for this compilation. The album features guest performances by E-40, Mac Dre, Baby Beesh, B-Legit, Levitti, Taydatay, Don Cisco and Frost. It features production by Johnny Z, Ken Franklin, Lev Berlak, Philly Blunt and Jay Tee.

== Track listing ==
| # | Title | Featuring | Originally released on | |
| # | Title | Featuring | Album | Year |
|---|---|---|---|---|
| 1 | "Back to the Hotel" | TL | Back to the Hotel | 1992 |
| 2 | "V-Town" | TL, B-Legit, E-40 | Back to the Hotel | 1992 |
| 3 | "The Weekend" | | Back to the Hotel | 1992 |
| 4 | "California Hot Tubs (Remix)" | | 24-7-365 | 1994 |
| 5 | "Where We Dwell" | Baby Beesh, Mac Dre | The Golden State | 1997 |
| 6 | "Game Tight" | Baby Beesh, Celly Cel | Latino Velvet Project | 1997 |
| 7 | "Raza Park" | Don Cisco, Baby Beesh, Frost, Roger Troutman | Latino Velvet Clique | 1998 |
| 8 | "What You Do (Remix)" | Baby Beesh, Don Cisco | Latino Velvet Project | 1997 |
| 9 | "We Gets Down Like That" | Don Cisco | The Rumble | 1998 |
| 10 | "We Be All Over" | The Mossie, Levitti | The Rumble | 1998 |
| 11 | "Wonderin'" | | The Rumble | 1998 |
| 12 | "Bay Area Playaz" | Mac Shawn, Taydatay, Cougnut, Da' Unda' Dogg, Kaveo, Baby Beesh, J Sweets, Don Cisco | The Rumble | 1998 |
| 13 | "Summertime In the City" | ODM | Slightly Pimpish/Mostly Doggish | 2000 |
| 14 | "Howda" | | Slightly Pimpish/Mostly Doggish | 2000 |
| 15 | "Fo Sho" | E-40, Baby Beesh | Velvet City | 2001 |
| 16 | "Telly" | Baby Beesh, Levitti | Velvet City | 2001 |
