= The Best of N2Deep =

- Original cover

Greatest hits album by N2Deep
- Released: March 9, 1999
- Recorded: 1991–1998
- Genres: West Coast hip-hop, gangsta rap, hip-hop, Chicano rap
- Length: 77:03
- Label: Soul Town Records
- Producers: Johnny Z, Jay Tee, N2Deep, Lev Berlak, Ken Franklin, Funk Daddy, DJ Mark 7, Dave G., Mac Lee

N2Deep chronology
| The Rumble (1998) | The Best of N2Deep (1999) | Slightly Pimpish/Mostly Doggish (2000) |

Jay Tee chronology
| N2Deep: The Rumble (1998) | The Best of N2Deep (1999) | N2Deep: Slightly Pimpish/Mostly Doggish (2000) |

2002 re-issue cover
- 40 Ounce Records remastered version

Professional ratings
Review scores
| Source | Rating |
|---|---|
| AllMusic | 4/5 stars |
| AllMusic | 4.5/5 stars |

The Best of N2Deep is the first greatest hits compilation and eighth album overall by rap group, N2Deep. The compilation was released in 1999 for Soul Town Records and was produced by N2Deep, Johnny Z and others. In 2002 the project was remastered and reissued with the same track listing on Jay Tee's own label 40 Ounce Records. The remastering was done by Larry Funk.

== Track listing ==
| # | Title | Featuring | Originally released on | |
| # | Title | Featuring | Album | Year |
|---|---|---|---|---|
| 1 | "Toss-Up" | | Back to the Hotel | 1992 |
| 2 | "Back to the Hotel" | | Back to the Hotel | 1992 |
| 3 | "V-Town" | E-40, B-Legit | Back to the Hotel | 1992 |
| 4 | "Small Town" | Mac Lee, PSD | 24-7-365 | 1994 |
| 5 | "California Hot Tubs" | | 24-7-365 | 1994 |
| 6 | "Somethin' Freaky" | | 24-7-365 | 1994 |
| 7 | "Deep N2 the Game" | | 24-7-365 | 1994 |
| 8 | "Day 2 Day Basis" | | The Golden State | 1997 |
| 9 | "Threesome" | PSD, Mac Lee | The Golden State | 1997 |
| 10 | "Situations" | | The Golden State | 1997 |
| 11 | "Parkin' Lot Pimpin'" | Levitti, Miami, Baby Beesh & Rube of Potna Deuce | The Golden State | 1997 |
| 12 | "Cali Lifestyles" | Dru Down, PSD | The Golden State | 1997 |
| 13 | "1st We Drink Then We Smoke" | Miami | The Rumble | 1998 |
| 14 | "The Throw" | Baby Beesh, Mac Dre | The Rumble | 1998 |
| 15 | "All Night" | Roger Troutman | The Rumble | 1998 |
| 16 | "Scrillafornia" | Young Dru, Mr. Ropa Dope | The Rumble | 1998 |
| 17 | "Wonderin'" | | The Rumble | 1998 |
