= Unreleased Game 1993: The Lost Album =

Studio album by N2Deep
- Released: October 22, 2002
- Recorded: 1993, 2002
- Genres: West Coast hip-hop, rap, gangsta rap
- Length: 48:13
- Label: 40 Ounce Records
- Producers: Jay Tee (exec.), Johnny Z,

N2Deep chronology
Slightly Pimpish/Mostly Doggish (2000)	Unreleased Game 1993: The Lost Album (2002)	The Movement (2008)

Jay Tee chronology
Negotiations (2002)	Unreleased Game (2002)	High Caliber (2002)

Unreleased Game 1993: The Lost Album is an album of previously unreleased material by American rap group N2Deep. Although recorded in 1993, it wasn't released until October 22, 2002, subsequently on Jay Tee's own label, 40 Ounce Records. The album was produced by Johnny Z and Jay Tee, in 2002. It features an early performance by Baby Beesh and his group Potna Deuce.

== Background ==
In 1993 N2Deep began recording what would eventually become Unreleased Game 1993: The Lost Album. The album was planned as a follow-up to their successful album debut, Back to the Hotel. Unfortunately before the project was released or even finished, the album masters were stolen from the studio during a break-in. After losing the nearly finished album and much of the studio's recording equipment, Profile proceeded to drop N2Deep from the label. Almost a decade later, the masters were recovered by the police. In 2002 the album was finally remixed and released on 40 Ounce Records. The finished project was subsequently titled: Unreleased Game 1993: The Lost Album. Some of the verses that appear on Unreleased Game 1993: The Lost Album were used on what became N2Deep's official second album, 24-7-365.

== Track listing ==
1. "In Demand" (featuring Baby Beesh & Rube of Potna Deuce) - 4:57
2. "Unemployed" - 3:43
3. "Say Hoe" - 4:34
4. "Bigg Ship" - 4:16
5. "Doin' It" - 4:05
6. "V-Town Brotha" (featuring Mac Lee & Cameosis) - 5:30
7. "Set 'n up Shop" - 4:14
8. "Step on the Gas" - 4:34
9. "Life Without Music" - 4:32
10. "Blaze" - 3:24
11. "Ciggin'" - 4:23
