= Brandon C. Rodegeb =

American rapper

Brandon C. Rodegeb, better known as B-12 (born October 9, 1977) is a music executive, film maker, and rap artist. Brandon was born in San Francisco, CA at San Francisco General Hospital and raised in Benicia, California. Living in an area rich in cultural and hip-hop history gave Brandon access to hip-hop music at an early age. The youngest son of a single mother with two brothers (one murdered in 1994) and a sister, Brandon was interested in music when very young.

Growing up around such rap legends as Too Short, 11/5, RBL Posse, and others, B-12 was able to get into music early. Success followed, although not immediately, and his family later moved to the nearby suburb of Vallejo, California in 1991.

He also made an album that featured several west coast artists including: MC Eiht, Celly Cel, Taydatay, 11/5, Young Droop, San Quinn, Luni Coleone, M.O.G., Jay Tee, Boo-Yaa T.R.I.B.E., Skee 64, Young Dru, Da' Unda' Dogg and also Eightball, who is from Memphis, Tennessee.

In 2002 B-12, Jay Tee & Young Dru formed the group Free Agents and released the album Negotiations on 40 Ounce Records. The project is described as "a loosely knit group of 'rap comrades' who came together to make a statement about independence and ownership in a turbulent time in the music industry."

== Discography ==
=== Collaboration albums ===
- Neva Look Back with Riderlife (2001)
- Negotiations with Free Agents (2002)

=== Compilation albums ===
- Bayriderz, Vol. 3: Kalifornia: State of Emergency with Jay Tee (2003)
- The Kollection (2017)

=== Guest appearances ===
Year	Artist	Album	Song
2001	Mob Figaz Ridah Presents	D Boyz Compilation	"Ball 'Till I Fall"
2001	40 Ounce Records Presents	Playas Association Vol. 3 - The Product	"As I Glance Back"
2002	Jay Tee	High Caliber	"Bounce Bounce" (featuring Don Cisco & Miami The Most)
2002	Various Artists	Playas Association Vol. IV - Northwest Hustlin	"Three the Hard Way" (featuring Dutch & Young Dru)
2003	Jay Tee & B-12 Present	Bayriderz, Vol. 3: Kalifornia: State of Emergency	"Mashin' Out" (featuring Mac Dre & Jay Tee)
2003	Jay Tee & B-12 Present	Bayriderz, Vol. 3: Kalifornia: State of Emergency	"I'm a Boss" (featuring Free Agents, Big Mack, Taydatay)
2003	Jay Tee & B-12 Present	Bayriderz, Vol. 3: Kalifornia: State of Emergency	"Fuck All Yall" (featuring Dutch, Mr. Kee & Jay Tee)
2003	Jay Tee & B-12 Present	Bayriderz, Vol. 3: Kalifornia: State of Emergency	"U Might Be" (featuring Riderlife & Young Dru)
2005	Luni Coleone	How the West Was Won, Vol. 2	"Problem With That" (featuring I-Rocc & Smigg Dirtee)
2005	Various Artists	On One: The 40 Ounce Album & Mixtape CD	"Outside the Club" (featuring Jay Tee)
2005	Various Artists	On One: The 40 Ounce Album & Mixtape CD	"Still Broke (Remix)" (featuring Chilee Powdah)
2005	Various Artists	On One: The 40 Ounce Album & Mixtape CD	"How We Roll" (featuring I-Rocc)
2005	Various Artists	On One: The 40 Ounce Album & Mixtape CD	"My Glock"
