= Ocean View, California =

Ocean View, California may refer to:

- Albany, California, named Ocean View from 1908-1909
- Ocean View, Berkeley, California
- Ocean View, San Francisco, California
