= In-A-Minute Records =

- Founded: 1991; 35 years ago
- Founder: Jason Blaine
- Defunct: 2000; 26 years ago
- Status: Defunct
- Genre: Hip hop, gangsta rap
- Country of origin: U.S.
- Location: Oakland, California

In-A-Minute Records was a record company founded in 1991 by Jason Blaine. It featured many artists from the underground bay area rap scene including RBL Posse, Andre Nickatina, I.M.P, Pooh-Man, Totally Insane. The label was shut down in 2000.

== Origins and early formation ==
The label was founded in 1991 in Oakland, California, by Jason Blaine, who was disappointed by the fact that many rappers in the Bay Area were unsigned at the time. He offered RBL Posse $10,000 ahead of time to sign with his label, which they quickly accepted due to the fact that they were still selling tapes on the street. Although the label never had any major commercially successful albums, Andre Nickatina's 1995 album I Hate You with a Passion appeared at #79 on the Billboard Top R&B/Hip-Hop Albums chart and #3 on the Billboard Heatseekers chart.

== Former artists ==
- Andre Nickatina (1992–1995)
- Rappin' 4-Tay (1991)
- Totally Insane (1991–1995)
- RBL Posse (1992–1994)
- Pooh-Man (1992–1995)
- Dogg Pound Posse (1993)
- Too Short (1993)
- Just-Ice (1995)
- Mac Mill (1995)
- West Coast Rhyme Sayrz (1995–1996)
- Master P (1991–1992)
- TRU (1991–1993)
- Rally Ral (1993)
- Sonya C (1991–1993)
- Hugh E.M.C. (1993)
- I.M.P (1993–1996)
- E-A-Ski (1992)

== Releases ==
Album information
Rappin' 4-Tay – Rappin' 4-Tay Is Back!!!
- Released: 1991
- Chart positions: NA
- RIAA certification: NA
Totally Insane – Direct from the Backstreet
- Released: 1992
- Chart positions: NA
- RIAA certification: NA
RBL Posse – A Lesson to Be Learned
- Released: 1992
- Chart positions: No.60 R&B Albums
- RIAA certification: NA
- Singles: Don't Give Me No Bammer
Dogg Pound Posse – Dogg E Style
- Released: 1993
- Chart positions: NA
- RIAA certification: NA
Andre Nickatina – The New Jim Jones
- Released: 1993
- Chart positions: NA
- RIAA certification: NA
- Singles: The Ave
I.M.P– Back In The Days
- Released: 1993
- Chart positions: No.100 R&B Albums
- RIAA certification: NA
Totally Insane – Goin' Insane
- Released: 1996
- Chart positions: No.61 Top R&B
- RIAA certification: NA
Pooh-Man – Ain't No Love
- Released: 1994
- Chart positions: NA
- RIAA certification: NA
RBL Posse – Ruthless by Law
- Released: 1994
- Chart positions: NA
- RIAA certification: NA
Andre Nickatina – I Hate You with a Passion
- Released: April 19, 1995
- Chart positions: No. 79 Top R&B
- RIAA certification: NA
- Singles: Situation Critical
Totally Insane – Backstreet Life
- Released: 1995
- Chart positions: No. 48 Top R&B
- RIAA certification:NA
Just-Ice – Kill the Rhythm (Like a Homicide)
- Released: 1995
- Chart positions: NA
- RIAA certification:NA
I.M.P – Ill Mannered Playas
- Released: Feb 22, 1996
- Chart positions: NA
- RIAA certification:NA
Pooh-Man – The State V.S. Poohman: Straight From San Quentin State Prison
- Released: 1997
- Chart positions: NA
- RIAA certification: NA
