= Get Another Love =

Single by Chantal Curtis

from the album Get Another Love
- B-side: "Hey Taxi Driver, I'm Burnin' (UK)"
- Released: 1979
- Genre: Disco
- Label: Pye International
- Songwriter: E. Donable
- Producer: P. Jaubert

Chantal Curtis singles chronology
"Get Another Love" (1979)	"Hit Man" (1979)

"Get Another Love" is a song by Tunisian-born French singer Chantal Curtis, released as a single in 1979. It was written by Ernest Donable who was a member of the band that backed her on the recording. The song is Curtis's most successful recording.

== Background ==
In 1979, two of her songs were predicted to do well by Cashbox in its June 2 issue. They were programmers picks in the "Can't Miss" category. Leon Wagner from Madison picked "Hey Taxi Driver", while Chuck Parsons of Baltimore picked "Get Another Love". In the US, "Get Another Love" was released as a single on Keylock Records and that release was remixed by Glen Blacks. In July 1979, it was on the Dallas / Houston disco chart at No. 11, just behind by the Gibson Brothers' "Cuba" at No. 10. Also, the July 14 issue of Record World reported it as being on the Discothèque Hit Parade at The Ritz in Houston. In the UK, the song was released on Pye International 7P 5003, and spent 3 weeks on the British charts, peaking at No. 51.

The song is included on her album Get Another Love which was released in France on Trema 310 066, and in the US on Keylock Records K3300. The album was produced by Pierre Jaubert. He also used the Lafayette Afro Rock Band as backing musicians. Ernest Donable who composed the song was the group's drummer.
