= Bootlegs & G-Sides, Vol. 2 =

Compilation album by 11/5
- Released: October 31, 2000
- Recorded: 2000
- Genre: Gangsta rap, West Coast hip hop
- Label: Dogday Records
- Producer: Ant Banks, Funk Daddy, Dush Tray

11/5 chronology
The Overdose (1999)	Bootlegs & G-Sides, Vol. 2 (2000)	After the Drama (2001)

Professional ratings
Review scores
Source	Rating
Allmusic	2.5/5 stars

Bootlegs & G-Sides, Vol. 2 was the fifth album released by rap group, 11/5 on October 31, 2000 for Dogday. It was produced by Ant Banks, Funk Daddy and Dush Tray; and it was a sequel to the original Bootlegs & G-Sides. Unlike the original, which featured various accomplished Bay Area rappers, this album featured more independent and unknown rappers.

== Track listing ==
1. "Tryin 2 Make Endz" - 3:46
2. "$, Murder and Sex" - 3:55
3. "Give It Up" - 5:08
4. "Loc-N-Load" - 4:30
5. "No Equals" - 3:16
6. "Weed Money" - 4:25
7. "Bad News" - 2:40
8. "Upz and Downz" - 3:48
9. "18 + 1" - 4:37
10. "Hoez Ain't Shit" - 4:23
11. "Roll 'Em Up" - 3:22
12. "So Sick" - 3:54
13. "Get on Up" - 4:00
14. "Bay Love" - 4:20
15. "Projection" - 4:26
