= How the Game Go =

How The Game Go

Studio album by Jay Tee
- Released: October 3, 2006
- Genres: West Coast hip-hop, gangsta rap, hip-hop, rap, Chicano rap
- Label: Jaime Trago Music
- Producers: Mike Cee, Vince V.

Jay Tee chronology
The Thousandaire (2005)	How The Game Go (2006)	The Camp Is Back (2007)

How The Game Go is an album by Vallejo, California rapper Jay Tee, from N2Deep/Latino Velvet.

== Track listing ==
1. "Off in the Bay"
2. "So Sick"
3. "Mack Hand" (featuring Baby Bash & Max Minelli)
4. "Player Status"
5. "In the Way of My Hustle" (featuring Young Dru)
6. "Sippin' on Bird"
7. "All I Wanted to Be"
8. "After 2"
9. "Savage Grind"
10. "One & Only Son"
11. "Slow Love"
12. "My Life"

== Sources ==
- AllMusic link
- 40 Ounce Records link
