= The Thousandaire =

Studio album by Jay Tee
- Released: June 21, 2005
- Recorded: 2005 in Concord, California; Sacramento, California; Phoenix, Arizona; Richmond, California
- Genres: West Coast hip-hop, gangsta rap, hip-hop, rap, Chicano rap
- Length: 43:50
- Label: D II Loyalty
- Producer: Ken Franklin

Jay Tee chronology
A Cold Piece of Work (2005)	The Thousandaire (2005)	How the Game Go (2006)

The Thousandaire is an album by Vallejo, California rapper Jay Tee, from N2Deep/Latino Velvet.

== Track listing ==
1. "Let's Get It On"
2. "Sexy Flame"
3. "Get Together"
4. "It Ain't Even Like That"
5. "One Night" (featuring Val Young)
6. "You Told Me"
7. "Feelin' You"
8. "Take My Hand"
9. "Heavy on Mind"
10. "She's My Homie"
11. "Every Minute" (featuring Young Dru)

== Sources ==
- AllMusic link
- 40 Ounce Records link
