= Chantal Curtis =

Tunisian-Israeli singer

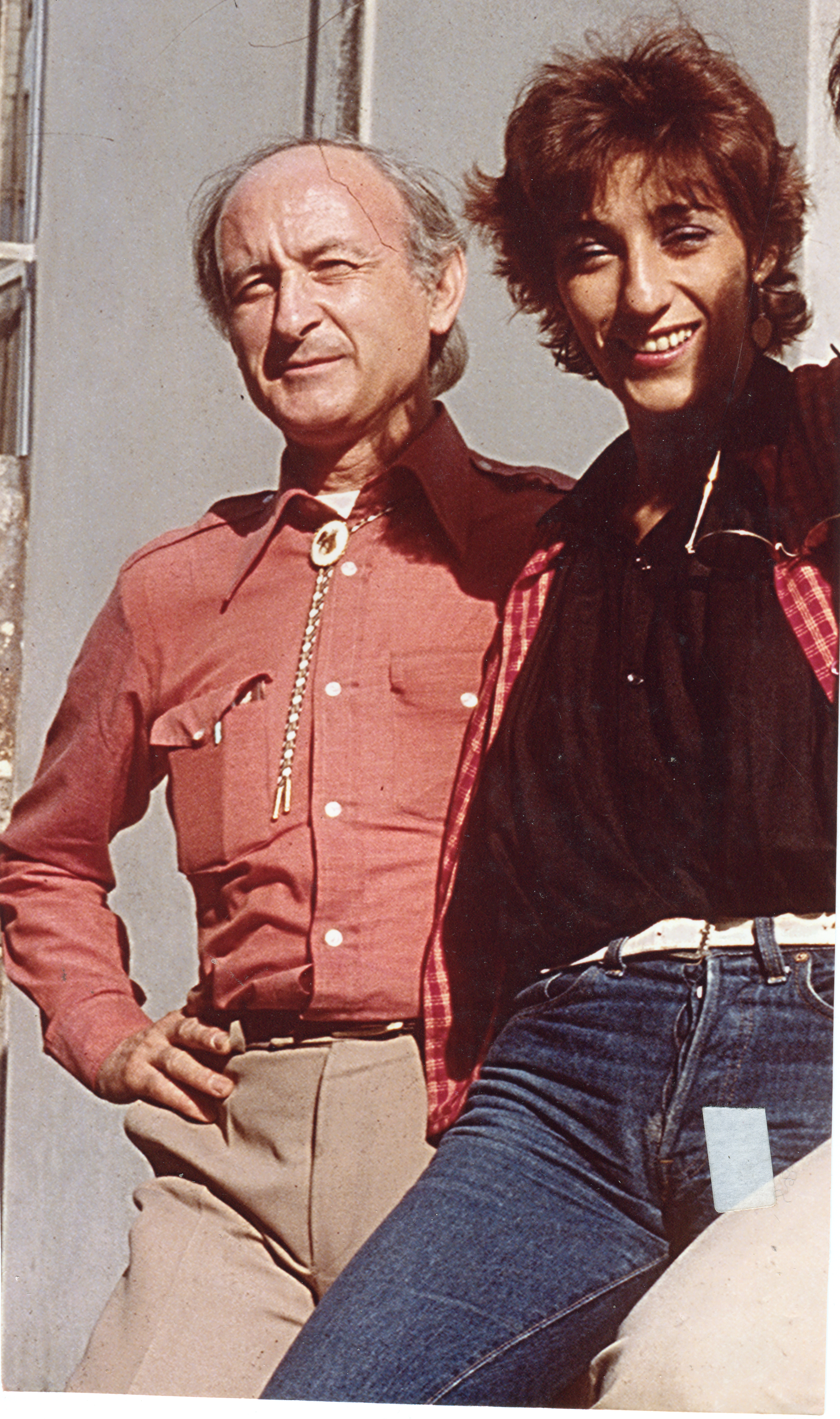
- Chantal Curtis with Pierre Jaubert

Background information
- Also known as: Chantal Alexandre, Julie Sitruk, Brenda Mitchell, Michele
- Born: Chantal Sitruk; Tunisia
- Died: 1985 Israel
- Genres: Rock, disco
- Occupation: Singer
- Years active: 1970s–1985
- Formerly of: Synthesis; Lafayette Afro Rock Band; André Ceccarelli

Chantal Curtis (born Chantal Sitruk) was a Tunisian-born French singer who had a disco hit in 1979 with "Get Another Love". She had some earlier recordings released under a different name. She died in Israel in 1985 having been hit by a bullet that was intended for her boyfriend. During her short career she had worked with Pierre Jaubert and Vladimir Cosma.

== Background ==
Curtis was born in Tunisia.

== Career ==
While walking through the streets of Paris in the 1970s and talking to another woman, she was overheard by producer Pierre Jaubert. Liking the sound of her voice, he asked her if she could sing. Wanting to work, she accepted the offer.

In the June 2, 1979, edition of Cashbox, two of her songs were programmers picks in the "Can't Miss" category. "Hey Taxi Driver" was a pick by Leon Wagner from Madison, and "Get Another Love" was picked by Chuck Parsons of Baltimore. "Get Another Love" was released on Keylock Records and that release was remixed by Glen Blacks. In July 1979, "Get Another Love" spent three weeks in the British charts, peaking at No. 51. It was also a disco hit that month on the Dallas / Houston disco chart at No. 11, just behind the Gibson Brothers' "Cuba" at No. 10. Also, the July 14 issue of Record World reported it as being on the Discothèque Hit Parade at The Ritz in Houston. The song was recorded years later by Karla Brown.

Her album was produced by Pierre Jaubert, who also used the Lafayette Afro Rock Band as backing musicians.

=== Session work ===
Curtis also did session work, backing other artists on their recordings. Along with Carol Rowley, Maryse Cremieux, and The Zulu Gang, she provided backing vocals for Pasteur Lappe on his album, Na Real Sekele Fo Ya, which was released on Disques Esperance in 1979. Also that year she provided backing vocals for an album by Kassav', Love And Ka Dance. She contributed backing vocals to the In Need Of ... album by Beckie Bell which was released on the Trema label in 1980. With Carole Rowley, she also provided vocals for the F.M. Band on their self-titled album which was also released in 1980 on the FM Productions label.

=== Different aliases ===
In 1973, a single called "Juste Un Petit Peu De Soleil / Rien N'a Changé" was released under the name Chantal Alexandre.

In 1977, Chantal recorded an album entitled Magic Love, released in the US on West End Records. The album contained four songs: "Can't You Feel It" and "Magic Love" on the A-side, and "Hold Me, Squeeze Me" and "Disco Dance" on the B-side. The album was produced by Pierre Jaubert and Tom Moulton.

"Disco Dance" was a hit in the U.S. and was released as a single there, on West End Records.

For the album covers and the television appearances, Sitruk was replaced by a female named Michele; some say it was commercial, her being "more attractive". A video of Michele singing "Magic Love" on French TV channel "Melody Variétés" can be found on YouTube.

In 1978, Curtis recorded an album entitled Don't You Know on the Barclay label. "Body Party" was released as a single, with "Honey Child" as the B-side.

The same year, Chantal released another single "Un Païs Tropical / Mystic Love", under the name Julie Sitruk.

== Death ==
Curtis died in Israel in 1985. She fell victim to an assassination attempt on her boyfriend (but not Philippe Briche), and was hit by the bullet that was intended for him.

== Discography ==
=== Albums ===
Title	Release info	Year	Country	Notes
Get Another Love	Keylock K3300	1979	USA	

=== Singles ===
Title	Release info	Year	Country	Notes
"Get Another Love" / "Hey Taxi Driver"	Trema 6198 291	1979	Netherlands	
"Get Another Love" / "Hey Taxi Driver"	Key K-7200	1979	U.S.	
"Get Another Love" / "I'm Burnin'"	Pye International 7P 5003	1979	UK	
"Hit Man" / "I Gotta Know"	Pye International 7P 5010	1979	UK	
"Fair And Square" / "Man To Come"	Trema 410 135	1980	France	

=== Appearances ===
List
Title	Artist	Song	Release info	Year	Notes
Albert est méchant (Bande originale du film de Hervé Palud)	Various	"Livin' Together"		2014	With Vladimir Cosma
Les incontournables, vol. 2 (Bandes originales de films composées par vladimir cosma)	Vladimir Cosma	"Go on for Ever"		2015	(From "La Boum"); Credited to Vladimir Cosma, Richard Sanderson & Chantal Curtis
Synthesis	Synthesis	"Feeling", "It's So New"	Dare-Dare – DD030LP	2002	Re-release of Arc ZAL 2005; LP first released in 1976; Credited as Chantal Alexandre
