= A Cold Piece of Work =

Studio album by Jay Tee
- Released: January 4, 2005
- Genres: West Coast hip-hop, gangsta rap, hip-hop, rap, Chicano rap
- Length: 50:44
- Label: 40 Ounce
- Producers: Johnny Z, Jay Tee, Ken Franklin

Jay Tee chronology
High Caliber (2002)	A Cold Piece of Work (2005)	The Thousandaire (2005)

A Cold Piece of Work is an album by American rapper Jay Tee, from N2Deep/Latino Velvet.

== Track listing ==
No.	Title	Length
1.	"Every Playa"	4:04
2.	"CP Dub"	3:59
3.	"Can't Figure It Out"	4:04
4.	"Do It Again"	4:00
5.	"Hot Pursuit"	2:35
6.	"Hoe Hoppin'"	3:14
7.	"Remind Me" (featuring Young Dru)	4:13
8.	"In the Game"	4:21
9.	"Say Goodbye" (featuring Gemini)	3:59
10.	"Hard Times"	4:18
11.	"Pimpin'" (featuring Young Dru)	4:03
12.	"Chop That Hoe" (featuring Baby Beesh & Mac Dre)	3:37
