= Velvetism =

Studio album by Latino Velvet
- Released: June 18, 2002
- Genres: West Coast hip-hop; hip-hop; gangsta rap; Chicano rap
- Length: 53:38
- Label: 40 Ounce Records
- Producers: Big Ice; Happy Perez; Jay Tee (exec.); Johnny Z; Oral Bee; Philly Blunt

Latino Velvet chronology
Velvet City (2000)	Velvetism (2002)	Menudo Mix (2004)

Jay Tee chronology
So Cold (2001)	Velvetism (2002)	Negotiations (2002)

Velvetism is the third studio album by American rap group Latino Velvet. It was released June 18, 2002 on Jay Tee's own label, 40 Ounce Records. The album was produced by Big Ice, Happy Perez, Johnny Z, Oral Bee and Philly Blunt. Latino Velvet was composed of Jay Tee and Baby Beesh at the time. Frost and Don Cisco both make multiple guest appearances on this album, as well as several other artists.

== Track listing ==
1. "Intro"
2. "Two Cold Cappers"
3. "They Don't Even Know" (featuring Don Cisco)
4. "Same Shit" (featuring Frost)
5. "On One" (featuring Miami)
6. "Vamanos" (featuring Merciless)
7. "Hustler Fo' Sho'" (featuring Young Dru & Russell Lee)
8. "What's Goin' On?" (featuring Frost)
9. "Latin Ladies" (featuring Don Cisco)
10. "She Was a Hustler" (featuring Mr. Kee)
11. "What's Up with You?" (featuring Don Cisco)
12. "Side Show" (featuring Frost & Young Mugzi)
13. "Vamanos (remix)" (featuring Merciless)
14. "What's Goin' On? (remix)" (featuring Frost)
15. "Outro"
