= Back to the Hotel (song) =

1992 single by N2Deep

Single by N2Deep

from the album Back to the Hotel
- Released: 1992
- Studio: K-Lou
- Genre: West Coast hip-hop
- Length: 5:04
- Label: Profile
- Songwriters: Timothy Lyon; James Trujillo; John Zunino
- Producer: Johnny Z

N2Deep singles chronology
"Work That Body" (1990)	"Back to the Hotel" (1992)	"Toss Up" (1992)

Music video
- "Back to the Hotel" on YouTube

"Back to the Hotel" is a song by American hip-hop duo N2Deep. It is the lead single from their debut studio album of the same name (1992) and their most successful song, peaking at number 14 on the Billboard Hot 100. "Back to the Hotel" is famously one of the first songs to sample the saxophone riff from "Darkest Light" by Lafayette Afro Rock Band. For this reason, it has often been compared to "Rump Shaker" by Wreckx-n-Effect, which was released later in the year and also contains this sample.

== Critical reception ==
Jeff Weiss of Passion of the Weiss commented "While it might not have been nearly as awesome as Teddy Riley & Co.'s ode to ass-shakin', hearing 'Back to the Hotel' for the first time in 15 years brought back nostalgia of dubbed tapes off the radio and grainy videos on the Box. It also brought the sad realization that one of my favorite childhood songs is actually pretty bad. Neither guy in N2Deep could rap for shit, their lyrics are Mims- sophisticated, and the video looks like it was done by a team of bored convicts in possession of a beat-up 8 mm camera." He further criticized some of the lyrics, such as "Cause you know what I mean when I'm feelin kinda funky / A sick honky, straight going donkey" and "And burn rubber up the block / Back to the tele, I gotta get some new cock". Comparing the song to "Rump Shaker", Steve "Flash" Juon of RapReviews wrote that "Back to the Hotel" features "much more sophisticated sample layering and a persistent percussive sound like a beeper going off".

== Music video ==
The music video sees the rappers "mean-mugging the camera" and driving around in a car, as well as a Black person playing the saxophone.

== Charts ==
=== Weekly charts ===
Chart (1992–1993)	Peak position
US Billboard Hot 100	14
US Hot R&B/Hip Hop Songs (Billboard)	29
US Hot Rap Songs (Billboard)	12
US Rhythmic (Billboard)	16

=== Year-end charts ===
Chart (1992)	Position
US Billboard Hot 100	78

== Certifications ==
Region	Certification	Certified units/sales
United States (RIAA)	Platinum	1,000,000^{‡}
^{‡} Sales+streaming figures based on certification alone.
