= Negotiations (Free Agents album) =

Studio album by Free Agents
- Released: September 10, 2002
- Genres: West Coast hip-hop, rap
- Length: 48:45
- Label: 40 Ounce
- Producers: Johnny Z, Big Ice, Stevie Dee, DJ Mark 7, Oral Bee

Jay Tee chronology
Latino Velvet: Velvetism (2002)	Negotiations (2002)	N2Deep: Unreleased Game 1993: The Lost Album (2002)

Free Agents is a loosely knit group of "rap comrades" who came together to make a statement about independence and ownership in a turbulent time in the music industry. The group consists of Jay Tee, B-12 & Young Dru and their first album Negotiations was released in 2002. The album was advertised as having "No Features, No Fillers." This can be seen as a departure of the norm by avoiding an album cluttered with guest appearances and over-priced producers.

== Track listing ==
1. "What You Been Lookin' For"
2. "Streets Got No Heart" (featuring Miami)
3. "Knock a Hoe"
4. "The Phone Call" (Jaime Trago n His Hutch)
5. "All Thru Yo' Town" (featuring Miami)
6. "Can't Fuck with Us"
7. "Do You Know" (featuring Andre Rivers)
8. "Problem Solver" (B-12)
9. "I Been Hustlin'" (featuring Weet Dog)
10. "Custom Tint" (Young Dru)
11. "Weight on My Shoulders" (featuring Weet Dog)
12. "If a Bitch Is Broke" (featuring Miami)
