= Latino Velvet Project =

Studio album by Latino Velvet
- Released: September 16, 1997; April 14, 1998 (re-release)
- Genres: West Coast hip-hop, gangsta rap, hip-hop, Chicano rap
- Length: 70:46 (re-release)
- Labels: Swerve Records, Lightyear Ent. (re-release)
- Producers: Johnny Z, Jay Tee, Baby Beesh, K-Lou, Ken Franklin, Funk Daddy, Greg G., Keith Martin, Jeeve, Levitti

Latino Velvet chronology
Latino Velvet Project (1997)	Velvet City (2000)

Jay Tee chronology
N2Deep: The Golden State (1997)	Latino Velvet Project (1997)	N2Deep: The Rumble (1998)

Alternative 1998 re-release cover
- Latino Velvet Clique

Singles from Latino Velvet Clique
- 1. "Raza Park" Released: March 31, 1998; 2. "What You Do" Released: October 13, 1998

Professional ratings
Review scores
Source	Rating
AllMusic	2.5/5 stars

Latino Velvet Project is the debut album of West Coast supergroup Latino Velvet. The group is composed of Jay Tee & Baby Beesh. Frost and Don Cisco both make multiple guest appearances on the album, as well as several other West Coast heavy-weights. The original version of the album was released on Swerve Records on September 16, 1997, and was quickly out-of-print and is now considered rare.

On April 14, 1998 Latino Velvet Project was reissued on Lightyear Entertainment and the cover photo altered and title changed to Latino Velvet Clique.

== Latino Velvet Project ==
Original 1997 release on Swerve Records.

=== Track listing ===
1. "The Experience" (featuring Frost)
2. "West Coast Radio" (featuring Don Cisco)
3. "Brand Nu Playa" (featuring N2Deep)
4. "Come Take a Ride" (featuring Mac Dre)
5. "Die on My Feet" (featuring Frost, Nino Brown, O Genius, Mellow Man Ace & ODM)
6. "Game Tight" (featuring Celly Cel)
7. "Raza Park (Original Version)" (featuring Don Cisco)
8. "Head Above Water" (featuring Frost)
9. "Good Perkin'"
10. "Whuzz' Up Homeboy"
11. "Dolla' Signs" (featuring Merciless)
12. "Threesome" (featuring PSD & Mac Lee)
13. "Buzzin'" (featuring Levitti)
14. "What You Do" (featuring ODM)
15. "Livin' a Dream"
16. "It Goes Down" (featuring St. Nick, Don Cisco, and Eric Chivo)
17. "Club Hoppin'"
18. "If You Let Me" (featuring Levitti & Down for Brown)

== Latino Velvet Clique ==
1998 re-release on Lightyear Entertainment.
On April 14, 1998 Latino Velvet Project was reissued on Lightyear Entertainment and the cover photo altered and title changed to Latino Velvet Clique. This version includes two new remixes of the song "Raza Park", featuring Frost, Roger Troutman and Don Cisco. The original version of "Raza Park" featuring Don Cisco isn't included here, however it does appear on the 2004 mixtape, Menudo Mix. Other than two other tracks being omitted, "Whuzz' Up Homeboy" and "It Goes Down", the rest of the original 1997 release is available here on Clique.

=== Track listing ===
1. "The Experience" (featuring Frost)
2. "West Coast Radio" (featuring Don Cisco)
3. "Brand Nu Playa" (featuring N2Deep)
4. "Come Take a Ride" (featuring Mac Dre)
5. "Die on My Feet" (featuring Frost, Nino Brown, O Genius, Mellow Man Ace & ODM)
6. "Game Tight" (featuring Celly Cel)
7. "Raza Park" (featuring Frost, Don Cisco & Roger Troutman)
8. "Head Above Water" (featuring Frost)
9. "Good Perkin'"
10. "Dolla' Signs" (featuring Merciless)
11. "Threesome" (featuring PSD & Mac Lee)
12. "Buzzin'" (featuring Levitti)
13. "What You Do" (featuring ODM)
14. "Livin' a Dream"
15. "Club Hoppin'"
16. "If You Let Me" (featuring Levitti & Down For Brown)
17. "Raza Park (remix)" (featuring Frost, Don Cisco & Roger Troutman)
