= Gun Talk =

Gun Talk may refer to:

- Gun Talk (radio program)
- Gun Talk (album), by MC Just-Ice
- Gun Talk (film), 1947 film
