= A Lesson to Be Learned =

Studio album by RBL Posse
- Released: September 16, 1992
- Recorded: 1992
- Genre: Hip-hop
- Length: 48:39
- Label: In-A-Minute
- Producer: Black C

RBL Posse chronology
A Lesson to Be Learned (1992)	Ruthless by Law (1994)

Singles from A Lesson to Be Learned
- 1. "Don't Give Me No Bammer" Released: 1993

Professional ratings
Review scores
Source	Rating
RapReviews	8.5/10

A Lesson to Be Learned is the debut studio album by American hip-hop group RBL Posse. It was released on September 16, 1992, through In-A-Minute Records. Produced by member Black C, it features a lone guest appearance from Totally Insane. The album peaked at number 60 on the US Billboard Top R&B/Hip-Hop Albums chart. Its single "Don't Give Me No Bammer" made it to number 16 on the Hot Rap Songs chart. In 2023, DJ Fresh released a remix album called A Lesson To Be Learned: Refreshed.

== Track listing ==
No.	Title	Length
1.	"Intro"	2:19
2.	"I Ain't No Joke"	4:00
3.	"More Like an Orgy"	3:57
4.	"Don't Give Me No Bammer"	6:08
5.	"Bitches on the Ding Dong"	4:23
6.	"A Lesson to Be Learned"	4:04
7.	"G's by the 1, 2, 3's" (featuring Totally Insane)	5:56
8.	"Remind Me"	5:52
9.	"Sorta Likea Psycho"	4:23
10.	"A Part of Survival"	4:58
11.	"Outro"	2:39
Total length:		48:39

== Personnel ==
- DJ Switch – scratches
- Christopher "Black-C" Matthews – producer (tracks: 1–6, 8–11)
- Tomie "T.C." Witherspoon – producer (track 7), engineering
- "Black Ed" Bellot – executive producer
- Acie Mathews – photography
- Debbie Sedlacek – graphics
- Norman Dizon – graphics
- Kevin Murray – legal

== Charts ==
Chart (1993)	Peak position
US Top R&B/Hip-Hop Albums (Billboard)	60
