= High Caliber =

Studio album by Jay Tee
- Released: October 22, 2002
- Genres: West Coast hip-hop, gangsta rap, hip-hop, rap, Chicano rap
- Length: 64:09
- Label: 40 Ounce Records
- Producers: Johnny Z, Happy Perez, Big Ice, Ken Franklin, GLS, Mister Pimp Lotion, Oral Bee

Jay Tee chronology
Unreleased Game 1993: The Lost Album (2002)	High Caliber (2002)	A Cold Piece of Work (2004)

High Caliber is an album by Vallejo, California rapper Jay Tee, from N2Deep/Latino Velvet.

== Track listing ==
1. "When I Come Thru"
2. "Everybody Love"
3. "Big Caddy"
4. "Boss to Preciseness" (featuring E-40 & Turf Talk)
5. "We Bubble" (featuring Baby Beesh)
6. "I Can't Go for That" (featuring Mac Dre & Miami)
7. "Shake the Spot"
8. "Born Ready" (featuring 10sion)
9. "Wants to Be"
10. "What We Do" (featuring Baby Beesh & Frost)
11. "Bounce Bounce" (featuring Don Cisco, B-12 & Miami)
12. "D.A.U. (skit)"
13. "Youngsta"
14. "Baby Girl" (featuring Gemini & MC Magic)

== Sources ==
AllMusic link
40 Ounce Records link
