= B12 (disambiguation) =

Vitamin B_{12} is a water-soluble vitamin with a key role in the normal functioning of the brain and nervous system, and for the formation of blood.

B12 or B-12 may also refer to:

== Music ==
- B12 (band), a British electronic music duo
- "B12", a song by Grey Daze led by Chester Bennington
- "B12", a song by Lil Durk from Almost Healed

== Transportation ==
- B12 (New York City bus), a bus line serving Brooklyn
- Bensen B-12, a 1961 American unconventional multirotor helicopter
- Chery B12, a 2007 Chinese Chery automobile model
- LNER Class B12, a class of steam locomotives
- Mallee Highway or B12, in Australia
- Martin B-12, a modified version of the Martin B-10 bomber
- Nissan Sunny B12, a car model
- Queensland B12 class locomotive, a class of steam railway locomotive
- Alpina B12, a car model by Alpina

== Other uses ==
- Brandon C. Rodegeb or B-12 (born 1977), American music executive, film-maker, rap artist, and writer
- Caro–Kann Defence's ECO code in chess
- B12, a student model clarinet manufactured by Buffet Crampon
- Amorphous boron, B_{12}, icosahedral allotrope of boron
- Boron-12 (B-12 or ^{12}B), a short-lived isotope of boron
- Big 12 Conference

== See also ==
- HLA-B12, an HLA-B serotype
- IgG1-b12, an antibody against the HIV surface protein gp120 found in some long-term nonprogressors
- 12B (disambiguation)
