= Bootlegs & G-Sides =

Compilation album by 11/5
- Released: August 5, 1997
- Recorded: 1996–1997
- Genre: Gangsta rap, West Coast hip hop
- Label: Dogday Records
- Producer: Reggie Smith, T.C., Race

11/5 chronology
A-1 Yola (1996)	Bootlegs & G-Sides (1997)	The Overdose (1999)

Professional ratings
Review scores
Source	Rating
Allmusic	3/5 stars

Bootlegs & G-Sides is a compilation album by rap group, 11/5. It was released on August 5, 1997 for Dogday Records and was produced by Premiere Music (Reggie "Reg" Smith, T.C. and Race). The album featured a variety of Bay Area Rappers including JT the Bigga Figga, Guce, Totally Insane and Skanless.

== Track listing ==
1. "Keep It Real" - 3:22
2. "Playaz & Hustlaz" - 4:18 (Featuring Totally Insane)
3. "415 Reasons" - 4:55 (Featuring Cold World Hustlers)
4. "Mission Complete" - 3:12
5. "187-304" - 4:08
6. "Countin' Money" - 4:25
7. "44 Maggie" - 4:24 (Featuring Neighborhood Kingpinz, Spice 1)
8. "K.A.H." - 5:22 (Featuring U.D.I., Cold World Hustlers)
9. "Another Killin' Season" - 3:50
10. "Premeditation" - 5:04
11. "Scrilla, Scratch, Paper" - 4:56 (Featuring JT the Bigga Figga, Cougnut)
12. "Stack Gritz" - 4:01 (Featuring Guce)
13. "Garcia Vegas" - 2:30
14. "Money" - 4:50 (Featuring Skanless)
15. "Killahoe Pimp" - 3:31
16. "Sucka Free" - 4:10
