= The Rumble (N2Deep album) =

Studio album by N2Deep
- Released: September 15, 1998
- Recorded: 1998
- Genres: West Coast hip-hop, gangsta rap, hip-hop, Chicano rap
- Length: 61:48
- Label: Lightyear Entertainment
- Producers: Johnny Z, Jay Tee, Lev Berlak, Ken Franklin (K-Lou), Funk Daddy, Stevie Dee, Dave Fore, DJ Mark 7, Terrance Richardson, Tony G.

N2Deep chronology
| The Golden State (1997) | The Rumble (1998) | The Best of N2Deep (1999) |

Jay Tee chronology
| Latino Velvet: Latino Velvet Project (1997) | The Rumble (1998) | N2Deep: The Best of N2Deep (1999) |

Singles from The Rumble
- 1. "1st We Drink Then We Smoke" Released: 1998; 2. "We Get's Down Like That" Released: 1998; 3. "All Night" Released: August 18, 1998

The Rumble is the fourth studio album and eighth album overall released by N2Deep. Although this album was released under the artist name N2Deep, The Rumble can actually be considered a Jay Tee solo album as TL only participates on one track, "1st We Drink Then We Smoke". The album was released in 1998 for Lightyear Entertainment and was produced by Johnny Z, Jay Tee, DJ Mark 7 and others. Three singles were released, "1st We Drink Then We Smoke", "We Get's Down Like That" and "All Night" and guests include Baby Beesh, The Mossie, Taydatay, Don Cisco, Mac Dre, Slow Pain and Roger Troutman.

== Track listing ==
1. "Intro" - 0:41
2. "1st We Drink Then We Smoke" (featuring TL & Miami) - 3:37
3. "We Gets Down Like That" (featuring Don Cisco; produced and engineered by Dave Fore) - 4:32
4. "The Throw" (featuring Baby Beesh & Mac Dre) - 4:12
5. "We Be All Over" (featuring The Mossie & Levitti) - 3:54
6. "My Doe Is Gettin' Low" (featuring Miami & The Looie Crew) - 5:28
7. "Where the G's At" (featuring Baby Beesh, Frost, Don Cisco, O'Genius, Slow Pain & Nino Brown) - 4:33
8. "All Night" (featuring Roger Troutman) - 4:02
9. "Wonderin'" - 3:45
10. "Scrillafornia" (featuring Young Dru & Mr. Ropa Dope) - 4:34
11. "Out Here Hustlin'" - 4:10
12. "Campaignin'" (featuring Moe Moe of Mobb Unit, Philly & Miami) - 4:15
13. "Livin'" - 4:35
14. "Full Timer" - 3:48
15. "Bay Area Playaz" (featuring Mac Shawn, Taydatay, Cougnut, Da' Unda' Dogg, Kaveo, Baby Beesh, Don Cisco & J Sweets) - 5:32
