= Kool & Deadly =

Studio album by Just-Ice
- Released: 1987
- Genre: Hip-hop
- Label: Fresh/Sleeping Bag Records; LPRE-5
- Producer: Just-Ice; KRS-One

Just-Ice chronology
Back to the Old School (1986)	Kool & Deadly (1987)	The Desolate One (1989)

Professional ratings
Review scores
Source	Rating
Allmusic	3/5 stars

Kool & Deadly (Justicizms) is the second album by old school/hardcore rapper Just-Ice, it was released in 1987, and was produced by KRS-One and Just-Ice. In 1998, the album was selected as one of The Source magazine's 100 Best Rap Albums. The song "Moshitup" was the origin of the hip hop meme "Suicide, it's a suicide".

== Music ==
The Washington Post noted that tracks "Moshitup" and "Lyric Licking" showcase reggae rhythms but the record is predominantly "sparse hip-hop, tough and raw".

== Reception ==
In a contemporary review, The Washington Post stated that the album "has an agenda that embraces more complicated topics, but it's hardly as benevolent as [Kool Moe Dee]" and described the album as "tough and raw but not especially distinctive"

== Track listing ==
1. "Going Way Back" (feat. KRS-One)
2. "The Original Gangster of Hip-Hop"
3. "Freedom of Speech"
4. "Moshitup" (feat. KRS-One)
5. "Kool & Deadly"
6. "On the Strength"
7. "Lyric Licking"
8. "Booga Bandit Bitch"
9. "Freedom Of Speech ’88" (12-inch Single Edit) [added when it was released on CD].

== Charts ==
=== Weekly charts ===
Chart (1988)	Peak position
US Top R&B/Hip-Hop Albums (Billboard)	14

=== Year-end charts ===
Chart (1988)	Position
US Top R&B/Hip-Hop Albums (Billboard)	51
