= Pierre Jaubert =

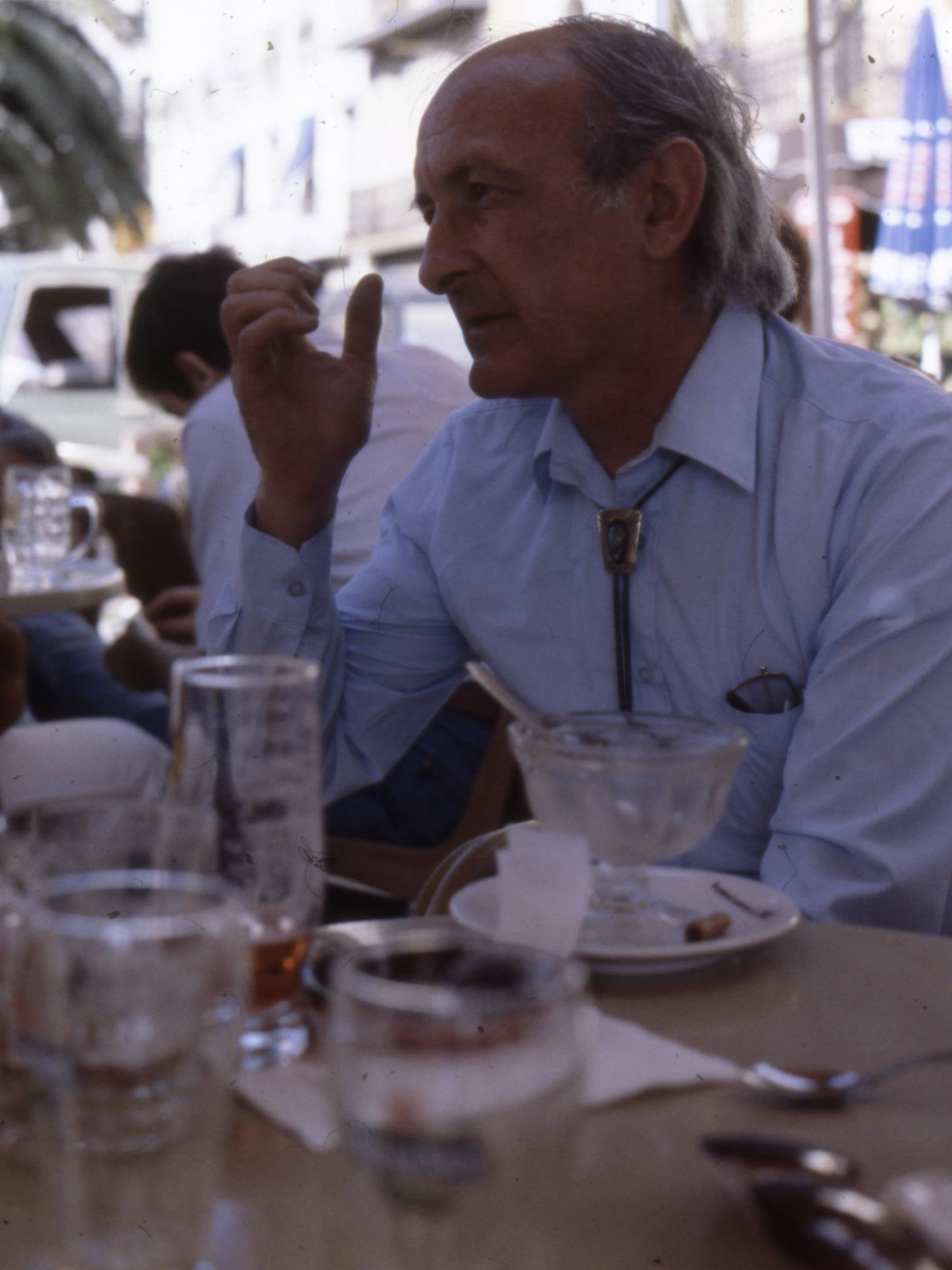

Background information
- Also known as: Pierre Berjot
- Born: 1929
- Died: August 2017 (aged 87–88)
- Genres: Disco, R&B, pop
- Occupation: Record producer
- Years active: 1960s to ?

Pierre Jaubert aka Pierre Berjot (1929 – August 2017) was a record company executive and a record producer. He has produced recordings for artists such as John Lee Hooker, Krispie And Company, The Lafayette Afro Rock Band, Mal Waldron, Leroy Gomez, Chantal Curtis, Beckie Bell and Richard Sanderson. According to the French Wikipedia he died on August 8, 2017.

== Career ==
=== 1960s ===
As of early 1967, he was the international manager for the French company Musicdisc which was the first French company to push 4-track cartridges. In 1967, he was announcing that his company was going to sell 4-track cartridges rather than 8-tracks. The following year he had said in an article that the company had switched to 8-tracks and they were having trouble satisfying the demand for them. Around 1969/1970, Jaubert produced a number of recordings for John Lee Hooker which included "Baby Don't Do Me Wrong", "Call It The Night" and "Going Home".

=== 1970s ===
He was still heading the international department for Musicdisc in 1971.

During the 1970s, he produced the album Candy Girl for Mal Waldron. The album never saw a proper release and only about 50 copies were pressed. Decades later in 2016, a copy of the LP would sell for US$1215. It was re-released as a limited edition of 500 on Libreville Records in 2016.

Two acts he discovered in the 1970s were the Lafayette Afro Rock Band and Chantal Curtis. He ended up using the Lafayette Afro Rock Band as his house session band at his Parisound studio. He spotted them performing at Barbès, a Paris district which had many North African immigrants. He discovered Chantal Curtis one day in the 1970s, overhearing her talking to a friend on a Paris street. Liking the sound of her voice, he asked her if she could sing and then offered her work. Jaubert used Lafayette Afro Rock Band on Curtis's Get Another Love album which produced a hit of the same name.

=== 1980s ===
He produced the Jamais Avant Le Mariage!! soundtrack album for Vladimir Cosma which was released in 1982. He produced a single, " Autant D'amoureux Que D'étoiles" for Annick Thoumazeau which was released on the Carrere label in 1984.
