= Masterpiece (Just-Ice album) =

Studio album by Just-Ice
- Released: 1990
- Studio: On Broadway (New York, NY)
- Genre: Hip hop
- Length: 43:03
- Label: Fresh
- Producer: Grandmaster Flash

Just-Ice chronology
The Desolate One (1989)	Masterpiece (1990)	Gun Talk (1993)

Singles from Masterpiece
- 1. "The Music" Released: 1989

Professional ratings
Review scores
Source	Rating
AllMusic	2/5 stars

Masterpiece is the fourth studio album by American rapper Just-Ice. It was released in 1990 through Fresh Records, making it his final album for the label. The production was handled entirely by Grandmaster Flash.

The album peaked at number 73 on the Billboard Top R&B/Hip-Hop Albums chart in the United States, supported with its lead single "The Music".

== Track listing ==
All lyrics are written by Joseph Williams, Jr.; all music is composed by Joseph Saddler.

No.	Title	Length
1.	"Get Into Something"	3:38
2.	"The Ice Man Cometh"	3:33
3.	"Flavor"	5:00
4.	"The Music"	4:26
5.	"Slow, Low and Dope"	3:42
6.	"Keep to Myself"	4:11
7.	"Rollin' with the Just"	3:27
8.	"Round N Round"	5:07
9.	"Tell It Like It Is"	5:08
10.	"I Write This in the Dark"	4:51
Total length:		43:03

== Personnel ==
- Joseph "Just-Ice" Williams Jr. – lyrics, vocals, mixing
- Angela "Angie Stone" Brown – backing vocals (track 10)
- Joseph "Grandmaster Flash" Saddler – keyboards (tracks: 1, 3, 5, 6), scratches, producer, mixing
- David "Fancy Fingers" Bright – keyboards (tracks: 4, 7, 10)
- Bobby Gordon – engineering, mixing
- Clarence "T Bird" Blocker – engineering assistant
- Michael Sarsfield – mastering

== Charts ==
Chart (1990)	Peak position
US Top R&B/Hip-Hop Albums (Billboard)	73
