= The Desolate One =

Studio album by Just-Ice
- Released: May 3, 1989
- Studio: Power Play Studios (New York, NY)
- Genre: Golden age hip hop; hardcore hip hop
- Length: 38:40
- Label: Fresh; Sleeping Bag
- Producer: Just-Ice; KRS-One

Just-Ice chronology
Kool & Deadly (1987)	The Desolate One (1989)	Masterpiece (1990)

Professional ratings
Review scores
Source	Rating
AllMusic	3/5 stars
RapReviews	6.5/10

The Desolate One is the third studio album by American rapper Just-Ice. It was released in 1989 through Fresh/Sleeping Bag Records. Recording sessions took place at Power Play Studios in New York. Production was handled by KRS-One and Just-Ice himself, with Ivan "DJ Doc" Rodriguez and D-Nice serving as co-producers. It features a guest appearance from Heavy D.

== Track listing ==
All lyrics are written by Joseph "Just-Ice" Williams Jr.; all music is composed by Lawrence "KRS-One" Parker.

No.	Title	Length
1.	"The Desolate One"	5:06
2.	"...And Justice for All"	4:12
3.	"Hardhead"	4:31
4.	"Welfare Recipients"	4:37
5.	"Ma Touch da Just"	3:03
6.	"It's Time I Release"	4:31
7.	"In the Jungle"	3:33
8.	"Hijack"	4:30
9.	"Ram Dance Hall Session" (featuring Heavy D)	4:37
Total length:		38:40

== Personnel ==
- Joseph "Just-Ice" Williams Jr. – lyrics, vocals, producer
- Dwight "Heavy D" Myers – vocals (track 9)
- Lawrence "KRS-One" Parker – producer, mixing
- Ivan 'Doc' Rodriguez – co-producer, engineering
- Derrick "D-Nice" Jones – co-producer
- Howie Weinberg – mastering
- Janette Beckman – photography
- Icon Design, NYC – art direction

== Charts ==
=== Weekly charts ===
Chart (1989)	Peak position
US Top R&B/Hip-Hop Albums (Billboard)	19

=== Year-end charts ===
Chart (1989)	Position
US Top R&B/Hip-Hop Albums (Billboard)	79
