= Hostile Takeover (album) =

Studio album by RBL Posse
- Released: May 8, 2001
- Recorded: 2000–2001
- Genre: Gangsta rap, West Coast hip hop
- Label: Right Way Records
- Producer: G-Man Stan

RBL Posse chronology
An Eye for an Eye (1997)	Hostile Takeover (2001)

Hostile Takeover is the fourth and final studio album by American rap group RBL Posse. It was released on May 8, 2001 for Right Way Records and was produced by G-Man Stan. Hostile Takeover proved to be the group's last album as Hitman was shot and killed in San Francisco on February 3, 2003, leaving Black C as the only surviving member.

== Track listing ==
1. "Intro"- 1:26
2. "You Know the Rulez"- 3:53
3. "Where Am I Going To"- 4:57
4. "The Vapors"- 4:37
5. "Nightmares"- 4:13
6. "Frisco, Frisco"- 3:47
7. "Baller Skit"- 1:03
8. "Lay'em Down"- 4:03
9. "Chasin the Sunshine"- 4:01
10. "Millenium Mayhem"- 3:57
11. "Stay Pump!"- 3:47
12. "Fuckin Wit Us"- 3:38
13. "What!, What!"- 3:57
14. "Feel Me"- 4:33
15. "Smooth Sailin'"- 3:58
16. "Tribute Skit"- 1:29
17. "Lost a Homie"- 4:09
18. "R.B.L. 2001"- 4:20
19. "Hostile Takeover"- 4:48
