= Jay Tee =

American rapper

- Also known as: Jaime Trago
- Born: James Trujillo
- Origin: Vallejo, California, U.S.
- Genres: West Coast hip-hop; gangsta rap; hip-hop; Chicano rap
- Occupations: Rapper; songwriter; producer; record company owner
- Years active: 1989–present
- Labels: 40 Ounce Records, Swerve, Bust It, Profile Records
- Website: 40ouncerecords.mybisi.com

James Trujillo, better known by his stage name Jay Tee, is an American rapper from Vallejo, California. He has been a part of the city's scene since the early 1990s as the lead member of N2Deep and Latino Velvet along with Baby Beesh. Even though N2Deep's 2000 album Slightly Pimpish/Mostly Doggish was a solo album, it was not until 2001 that Jay Tee released a solo album under his own name, So Cold.

Latino Velvet was originally composed of Jay Tee and Baby Beesh in 1997 on the album Latino Velvet Project. Although the album featured several tracks with Frost and Don Cisco, it was not until 2000 that they were featured on the cover with equal billing to Jay Tee and Baby Beesh. Velvet City featured several west coast artists including: E-40, Levitti, Rappin' 4-Tay, Bosko, Cool Nutz and the Mary Jane Girls.

Jay Tee is the founder and owner of 40 Ounce Records. Jay Tee has remained an underground presence in The Bay Area since his debut almost two decades ago.

== Discography ==
=== Studio albums ===
- So Cold (2001)
- High Caliber (2002)
- A Cold Piece of Work (2005)
- The Thousandaire (2005)
- How the Game Go (2006)
- A.K.A. Jaime Trago (2008)
- Money in the Streets (2010)
- The Game is Cold (2013)
- Vallejo Mentality (2014)
- End of an Era (2021)

=== with N2Deep ===
- Back to the Hotel (1992)
- 24-7-365 (1994)
- The Golden State (1997)
- The Rumble (1998)
- Slightly Pimpish/Mostly Doggish (2000)
- The Movement (2008)

=== with Latino Velvet ===
- Latino Velvet Project (1997)
- Velvet City (2000)
- The Camp Is Back (hosted by Chingo Bling) (2007)
- The Best of Latino Velvet (2008)

=== Collaboration albums ===
- Negotiations with Free Agents (2002)
- Velvetism with Baby Beesh (2002)
- Out Here Hustlin' with Young Dru (2007)
- M.S.U. with Baby Beesh (2012)

=== Compilation albums ===
- Playas Association – Tha Bomb Bay (1996)
- Playas Association Vol. 2 – Full Time Hustlin (1998)
- The Knocks 1992–2000 (2001)
- 40 Ounce Records Hardest Hits: 10 Years in the Game '92-'02 (2001)
- Playas Association Vol. 3 – The Product (2001)
- Playas Association Vol. IV – Northwest Hustlin (2002)
- Bayriderz, Vol. 3: Kalifornia: State of Emergency with B-12 (2002)
- On One: The 40 Ounce Album & Mixtape (2004)
- Everybody Ain't Able with Mac Dre (2007)
- Appearances Volume 1 (2008)
- Appearances Volume 2 (2009)
- Bay to Santa Fe (2011)

=== Mixtapes ===
- He Got Game (hosted by Insane Mixaken) (2005)

=== Guest appearances ===
Year	Album	Song
1996	The Rompalation	"Where We Dwell" (Mac Dre featuring Jay Tee & Baby Beesh)
1997	Spread Yo Hustle Compilation	"You Should Never Be Broke" (Jay Tee & Baby Beesh)
1999	If You Could See Inside Me	"Presidential" (A Lighter Shade of Brown featuring Jay Tee & Frost)
1999	That Was Then, This Is Now, Vol. 1	"Act Like Ya Want It" (Frost featuring Rappin' 4-Tay, Jay Tee & Don Cisco)
1999	That Was Then, This Is Now, Vol. 1	"Feria (Frost featuring Jay Tee & Baby Beesh)"
1999	The Rompalation Volume 2	"Howda" (Jay Tee)
1999	What It Is	"Off Yo' Ass" (PSD featuring Jay Tee)
1999	3 Beam Circus 2 – Connect Game	"We Keep Our Game Tight" (Jay Tee & Young Dru)
2000	Desolate Situations Vol. 1: Desolate	"Mo' Money, Mo' Kic'n" (Da'unda'dogg featuring Jay Tee)
2000	The Album	"Done Deal" (D.B.A. featuring B-Legit, Jay Tee & Baby Beesh)
2000	Oh Boy	"Breezy" (Don Cisco featuring Baby Beesh & Jay Tee)
2000	That Was Then, This Is Now, Vol. 2	"Thug Shit" (Frost featuring Mr. Lil' One, Jay Tee & Bad Boy)
2001	Savage Dreams	"Crossing Game" (Baby Beesh featuring Frost, Jay Tee, Sneak & BR)
2001	Neva Look Back	"Another Weekend" (Riderlife featuring Jay Tee)
2001	Bay 2 Sac	"We Run This" (Taydatay featuring Jay Tee & Young Dru)
2002	On Tha Cool	"Dime Piece" (Baby Beesh featuring Jay Tee & Russell Lee)
2003	Tha Smokin' Nephew	"Tha Chop" (Baby Bash featuring A-Wax & Jay Tee)
2003	Somethin' 4 the Riderz	"Same Shit" (Frost featuring Baby Bash & Jay Tee)
2003	Somethin' 4 the Riderz	"We Ride Hot" (Frost featuring Messy Marv & Jay Tee)
2003	Somethin' 4 the Riderz	"Last Nite" (Frost featuring Jay Tee)
2003	Somethin' 4 the Riderz	"Party Goin' Down Tonight" (Frost featuring Jay Tee)
2004	Ménage à Trois	"Who Wanna Creep" (Baby Bash featuring Latino Velvet)
2005	Super Saucy	"Hennessey" (Baby Bash featuring Jay Tee, Mac Dre & Miami The Most)
2005	It'z Real Out Here	"Seniorita" (Celly Cel featuring Jay Tee)
2005	Hustler's Paradise	"It Ain't Easy" (Don Cisco featuring Banx & Jay Tee)
2005	Welcome to Frost Angeles	"The Kaper" (Frost featuring Cameosis & Jay Tee)
2005	Once Upon a Time in Los Scandalous	"All Night" (Nino Brown featuring Don Cisco & Jay Tee)
2006	Final Fight: Streetwise soundtrack	"Holdin' On" (Jay Tee)
2006	Da Playboy Foundation	"Last Night" (Big Ice & Oral Bee featuring Frost, Bullet, Jay Tee & Arjay)
2006	Da Playboy Foundation	"We Ride Hot Cuzzin" (Big Ice & Oral Bee featuring Jay Tee, Frost & Messy Marv)
2006	Da Playboy Foundation	"Shake The Spot" (Big Ice & Oral Bee featuring Jay Tee & Young Dru)
2007	The Next Level	"U Gotta Love It" (Big Fedi featuring Jay Tee, Chino 4 Real & Merciless)
2008	Goodie Girls	"Legs Open" (AP.9 featuring Jay Tee)

== See also ==
- List of Chicano rappers
