= VII (Just-Ice album) =

Studio album by Just-Ice
- Released: April 7, 1998
- Recorded: 1997−1998
- Studio: Strong Island Studios (New York, NY)
- Genre: Hip-hop
- Length: 39:16
- Label: Warlock
- Producer: Bobby LaSerra; Just-Ice; Kibret Neguse

Just-Ice chronology
Kill the Rhythm (Like a Homicide) (1995)	VII (1998)

Professional ratings
Review scores
Source	Rating
AllMusic	2/5 stars

VII is the seventh studio album by American rapper Just-Ice. It was released on April 7, 1998, through Warlock Records. Recorded at Strong Island Studios in New York City, it features contributions from Chubb Rock. Two songs from the album, "Cool and Wicked" and "Way Back (We're Going)", were included into his 2013 compilation Sir Vicious: The Best of Just-Ice.

== Track listing ==
No.	Title	Length
1.	"Free Flow"	3:27
2.	"Cool and Wicked"	3:48
3.	"Pressure Dem"	3:37
4.	"Way Back (We're Going)"	4:25
5.	"Jedi"	3:58
6.	"If Ya Kill Sound"	3:22
7.	"Cold Getting Dumb ('98 Remix)"	4:04
8.	"C'mon and Try and Get It"	4:29
9.	"Lip Service"	3:36
10.	"Have You Ever?"	4:30
Total length:		39:16
