= An Eye for an Eye (RBL Posse album) =

Studio album by RBL Posse
- Released: September 30, 1997
- Recorded: 1997
- Studio: The Cosmic Slop Shop; Bayview Productions; Infinite Studios; Sound Castle; Echo Sound; Find-A-Way Studios
- Genre: West Coast hip hop; gangsta rap
- Length: 1:04:00
- Label: Big Beat Records
- Producer: Tony Jackson (exec.); Barr 9 Productions; Black-C; Cellski; Femi Ojetunde; G-Man Stan; Mike Caren; Mike Mosley; Rick Rock; The Enhancer

RBL Posse chronology
Ruthless by Law (1994)	An Eye for an Eye (1997)	Hostile Takeover (2001)

Singles from An Eye for an Eye
- 1. "How We Comin'" Released: 1997

Professional ratings
Review scores
Source	Rating
The Source	3/5 stars

An Eye for an Eye is the third studio album by American hip hop group RBL Posse. It was released on September 30, 1997, via Big Beat/Atlantic Records. Recording sessions took place at the Cosmic Slop Shop, Bayview Productions, Infinite Studios, Sound Castle, Echo Sound, and Find-A-Way Studios. Production was handled by Rick Rock, Femi Ojetunde, Mike Mosley, The Enhancer, Barr 9 Productions, Cellski, G-Man Stan, Mike Caren, and member Black-C. It features guest appearances from Cosmic Slop Shop, Mystikal, Herm, Kenfolks, MC Eiht, N.O.H. Mafia, Richie Rich, Tela and Young Ed.

The album debuted at number 70 on the Billboard 200 and at number 14 on the Top R&B/Hip-Hop Albums in the United States. Its lead single "How We Comin'" peaked at No. 90 on the Hot R&B/Hip-Hop Singles & Tracks and No. 22 on the Hot Rap Singles. This is also the group's first ever album to not feature Mr. Cee, as he was fatally shot on New Year's Day 1996.

== Track listing ==
No.	Title	Writer(s)	Producer(s)	Length
1.	"The Individual"	Christopher Matthews; Ricky Herd; Ricardo Thomas	Rick Rock	5:51
2.	"How We Comin' (Southern Fried Mix)" (featuring Mystikal and Cosmic Slop Shop)	Matthews; Antron Singleton; Herd; Michael Tyler; Thomas	Rick Rock	4:50
3.	"1 Time 4 the Homies"	Matthews; Herd; Don Marsh; Tomie C. Witherspoon	The Enhancer; T.C.^{[c]}	3:54
4.	"More Game" (featuring Richie Rich)	Richard Serrell; Matthews; Herd; Mike Mosley; Femi Ojetunde	Mike Mosley; Femi Ojetunde	4:55
5.	"Straight Lacin'"	Matthews; Herd; James Forman	Black-C; The Enhancer^{[c]}	5:02
6.	"Gone Away"	Matthews; Mosley; Ojetunde; Ralph MacDonald; William Salter	Mike Mosley; Femi Ojetunde	4:02
7.	"So Tuff" (featuring Herm)	Andre Herm Lewis; Marcel Wade	Cellski	2:00
8.	"An Eye for an Eye"	Matthews; Herd; Thomas	Rick Rock	5:13
9.	"Concrete Jungle"	Matthews; Herd; Thomas	Rick Rock	4:07
10.	"How We Comin' (West Side Mix)" (featuring Big Lurch and Mystikal)	Matthews; Singleton; Herd; M. Tyler; Michael Caren; George Clinton, Jr.; William Collins; Bernie Worrell	Mike Caren	4:11
11.	"You Can't Hang"	Matthews; Herd	Black-C; The Enhancer^{[c]}	3:40
12.	"Gotta Git Mine" (featuring TQ, MC Eiht and Tela)	Matthews; Aaron Tyler; Winston Rogers; Herd; Thomas	Rick Rock	5:54
13.	"Strictly This Game"	Matthews; Stan Keith, Jr.; S. Lacy	G-Man Stan	4:55
14.	"'Til the End" (featuring The P-O-S-S-E)	Matthews; J. Massey; Eddie Stevenson; K. Williams; Maurice Harris; Malcolm Maddox; Herd; Maurice Thompson; Jay Williams	Barr Nine Productions	5:35
Total length:				1:04:00

Notes

- ^{^[c]} signifies a co-producer.

== Personnel ==
- Christopher "Black-C" Matthews – vocals, producer (tracks: 5, 11), mixing (tracks: 3, 5, 7, 11)
- Ricky "Hitman" Herd – vocals
- Antron "Big Lurch" Singleton – vocals (tracks: 2, 10)
- Michael "Mystikal" Tyler – vocals (tracks: 2, 10)
- Marvin "Doonie Baby" Selmon – background vocals (track 2)
- Richard "Richie Rich" Serrell – vocals (track 4)
- Iyesha Johnson – background vocals (tracks: 5, 13)
- Andre "Herm" Lewis – vocals (track 7)
- Bosko Kante – background vocals (track 10)
- Aaron "MC Eiht" Tyler – vocals (track 12)
- Winston "Tela" Rogers – vocals (track 12)
- Terrance "TQ" Quaites – background vocals (track 12)
- Eddie "Young Ed" Stevenson – vocals (track 14)
- Maurice "Hustla Moe" Harris – vocals (track 14)
- Malcolm "Mally Mal" Maddox – vocals (track 14)
- Kenfolks – vocals (track 14)
- Don "The Enhancer" Marsh – keyboards & drum programming (tracks: 3, 5), producer (track 3), co-producer (tracks: 5, 11), mixing (tracks: 3, 5, 7, 11)
- Ricardo "Rick Rock" Thomas – producer (tracks: 1, 2, 8, 9, 12)
- Tomie "T.C." Witherspoon – co-producer (track 3)
- Mike Mosley – producer (tracks: 4, 6), mixing (track 6)
- Femi Ojetunde – producer (tracks: 4, 6), mixing (track 6)
- Marcel "Cellski" Wade – producer (track 7)
- Mike Caren – producer & mixing (track 10), A&R
- "G-Man" Stan Keith – producer (track 13)
- Jay Williams – producer & mixing (track 14)
- Maurice Thompson – producer & mixing (track 14)
- Michael Denten – mixing (tracks: 1, 2, 4, 8, 9, 12), recording (track 14)
- Sienna Nervo – assistant recording (tracks: 8, 14)
- Gabe Chiesa – mixing (track 10)
- Brian "Big Bass" Gardner – mastering
- Tony Jackson – executive producer, management
- Victor Hall – photography, artwork

== Charts ==
Chart (1997)	Peak position
US Billboard 200	70
US Top R&B Albums (Billboard)	14
