= I.M.P =

American hip hop group

- Origin: San Francisco, California, United States
- Genres: West Coast hip hop; gangsta rap; Hardcore rap
- Years active: 1988–1996
- Labels: In-a-Minute; Sucka Free; Maxcacious
- Past members: Cougnut; C. Fresh; D.J. Ill Chill; Hitman Stinge; M.C. Louie Loc.; Andre Nickatina; Rob V; Stingy

I.M.P (an abbreviation of Ill Mannered Posse) was a gangsta rap group from San Francisco, California, originally made up of C-Fresh, Cougnut, Dre Dog later known as Andre Nickatina, Lou-E-Loc and Rob V. Their most known album is the underground classic Ill Mannered Playas, released in 1996 on In-A-Minute Records.

== History ==
I.M.P was one of the original rap groups from San Francisco. The group was also where San Francisco's rapper Andre Nickatina started his career. He has made several references to I.M.P and collaborated with Cougnut on the song Muthafucka on the album I Hate You with a Passion. The group's leader Cougnut died on September 4, 2001, from injuries sustained in a car crash.

== Formation and early years (1988–1993) ==
The group's leader Cougnut formed the group in 1989 in San Francisco along with members C. Fresh, D.J. Ill Chill, Hitman Stinge and M.C. Louie Lou. Later on Andre Nickatina joined in 1993 but left soon after to form a solo career. The front man Cougnut was known for his deep voice and street credibility.

== Legacy ==
Andre Nickatina has referenced the I.M.P in his song Smoke Dope and Rap. They are well known in the bay area underground rap scene for releasing their underground classic Ill Mannered Playas in 1996 which would also serve as their last album.

== Personnel ==
- C. Fresh (1989–1996)
- D.J. Ill Chill (1989–1996)
- Hitman Stinge (1989–1996)
- Rob V (1989–1996)
- Andre Nickatina (1993–1993)
- M.C. Louie Lou. (1989–1996)
- Cougnut (1989–1996; died 2001)
- Stingy (1989–1996)

== Discography ==
Studio albums

- Back in the Days (1993)
- Ill Mannered Playas (1996)

Extended plays

- No Prisoners (1989)
- I.M.P. Dogs (1990)
