= Back to the Old School =

Studio album by Just-Ice
- Released: May 3, 1986
- Genre: East Coast hip-hop, hardcore hip-hop, gangsta rap
- Length: 48:21 (reissue)
- Label: Fresh/Sleeping Bag Records; LPRE-1
- Producer: Kurtis Mantronik; Just-Ice (track #10)

Just-Ice chronology
Back to the Old School (1986)	Kool & Deadly (1987)

Professional ratings
Review scores
Source	Rating
AllMusic	4.5/5 stars

Back to the Old School is the debut album by American rapper Just-Ice. It was released in 1986, and was produced by Kurtis Mantronik. The album has been described as a classic early hip-hop album and revolutionary for its time by AllMusic.

== Track listing ==
1. "Cold Gettin' Dumb" (Just-Ice, Kurtis Mantronik) – 4:32
2. "Love Story" (Just-Ice, Mantronik) – 4:54
3. "Back to the Old School" (Just-Ice, Mantronik) – 4:50
4. "Latoya" (Just-Ice, Mantronik) – 4:12
5. "Gangster of Hip Hop" (Just-Ice, Mantronik) – 5:09
6. "Little Bad Johnny" (Just-Ice, Mantronik) – 3:32
7. "Put the Record Back On" (Just-Ice, Mantronik) – 3:51
8. "Turbo-Charged" (Just-Ice, Mantronik) – 5:11
9. "Cold Gettin' Dumb II" (Just Ice, Mantronik) – 6:33 (Originally a 12-inch single, it was added when the album was released on CD)
10. "That Girl is a Slut" (Just-Ice) – 5:16 (Originally a b-side, it was added when the album was released on CD)

The album cover artwork was done by Gnome and Gemini/Gem7 (Prez and Vice, respectively of the CWK - Craftwork Kings graffiti crew)

== Charts ==
Chart (1986)	Peak position
US Top R&B/Hip-Hop Albums (Billboard)	67
