= 12B (disambiguation) =

12B is a 2001 Indian Tamil-language film by Jeeva.

12B may also refer to:

- New York State Route 12B, a state highway in the central part of New York
- Missouri Route 12B
- Nebraska Spur 12B
- WASP-12b, an extrasolar planet
- HAT-P-12b, an extrasolar planet
- Boron-12 (^{12}B), an isotope of boron
- 12B, a short-lived Mazda Wankel engine
- 12B United States MOS enlisted (military occupational specialty) for "Combat Engineer"
- 12b, an alternative name for the Ontario Academic Credit program

== See also ==
- B12 (disambiguation)
