= The Overdose =

Studio album by 11/5
- Released: November 2, 1999
- Recorded: 1996–1997
- Genres: Gangsta rap, west coast hip hop
- Label: Dogday Records
- Producers: Sean T, T.C., The Enhancer, Mr. Laid, Chill Black, Tone Capone

11/5 chronology
Bootlegs & G-Sides (1997)	The Overdose (1999)	Bootlegs & G-Sides, Vol. 2 (2000)

Professional ratings
Review scores
Source	Rating
AllMusic	3/5 stars

The Overdose is the fourth studio album by rap group 11/5. It was released on November 2, 1999 on Dog Day, and featured production from T.C., The Enhancer, Mr. Laid, Chill Black and Sean T. This was the group's first studio album to not make it on any charts.

== Track listing ==
1. "Overdose Intro" feat. Billy Jam – 0:39
2. "Cell Phone" – 3:58
3. "Blockstyle Murderah" – 4:09
4. Commercial By "No. 1 B*ch Killa" Ice Man – 0:37
5. "Parkin' Lot Pimpin'" feat. Big Charlie Baxter – 3:06
6. "Back from Hell" – 4:35
7. "Yo Town Is Mine" – 3:37
8. "Live Another Day" – 4:00
9. "Scocious" feat. Black C – 3:58
10. "VIP'z" feat. K.A.H. – 5:21
11. "All About Our Endz" – 3:19
12. "What I Need" – 3:34
13. "Timez Up" feat. Danita Coleman – 4:52
14. "STR8 Game" – 3:45
15. "Pimpin' Aint Easy" – 3:45
16. "Parkin' Lot Pimpin'" (Radio Edit) – 3:07
