= Fiendin' 4 tha Funk =

Studio album by 11/5
- Released: March 31, 1995
- Recorded: 1994–1995
- Genre: Gangsta rap; West Coast hip hop
- Length: 43:28
- Label: Dogday Records
- Producer: The Enhancer, Reggie Smith, T.C.

11/5 chronology
Fiendin' 4 tha Funk (1995)	A-1 Yola (1996)

Professional ratings
Review scores
Source	Rating
AllMusic	3/5 stars

Fiendin' 4 tha Funk is the debut studio album by rap group 11/5. It was released on March 31, 1995, for Dogday Records, and featured production from The Enhancer, T.C. and Reggie Smith. Fiendin' 4 tha Funk peaked at #76 on the Billboard's Top R&B/Hip-Hop Albums.

== Track listing ==
1. "Peace, Knowledge, Unity"- 1:40
2. "11/5 on the Inside"- 4:06
3. "Garcia Vegas"- 3:02
4. "Straight Murderism"- 3:03
5. "Pimp Theme"- 3:45
6. "Flat on Yo Ass"- 3:42
7. "U.D.C.W.I. of 11/5"- 4:41 (Featuring Cold World Hustlers, U.D.I.)
8. "Fiendin 4 tha Funk"- 3:55
9. "The Way I Was Raised"- 3:27
10. "Billy "Studio Danksta" Jam- 0:07
11. "Brousin"- 4:04
12. "Hell Raiser"- 3:24
13. "Kill-a-Hoe"- 4:32 (Featuring U.D.I.)

== Samples ==
Brousin'

- "Whatever You Want" by Tony! Toni! Toné!

Flat on Yo Ass

- "Sneakin' in the Back" by Tom Scott and the L.A. Express

Garcia Vegas

- "The Walk" by The Time

Straight Murderism

- "High Powered" by Dr. Dre
