= A-1 Yola (11/5 album) =

Studio album by 11/5
- Released: July 23, 1996
- Recorded: 1995–96
- Genre: Hip-hop
- Length: 50:38
- Label: Dogday Records
- Producer: Big Reg; Chill Black; Mr. Laid; Race; T.C.

11/5 chronology
Fiendin' 4 tha Funk (1995)	A-1 Yola (1996)	Bootlegs & G-Sides (1997)

Professional ratings
Review scores
Source	Rating
AllMusic	3/5 stars

A-1 Yola is the second studio album by American hip-hop group 11/5. It was released on July 23, 1996, through Dogday Records. Production was handled by T.C., Big Reg, Race, Mr. Laid and Chill Black. It features guest appearances from Baby Menace, Baldhead Rick, Big Mack, Big Reg, Billy Jam, Dush Tray, Fly Nate Tha Banksta, Iceman, Lacresha Parker, Natisha Anderson, Nia, One Tyme, Race and T-Lowe.

In the United States, the album peaked at number 33 on the Top R&B/Hip-Hop Albums and number 22 on the Heatseekers Albums charts.

== Track listing ==
No.	Title	Producer(s)	Length
1.	"Intro (Billy "Tha Studio Danksta" Jam)" (featuring Billy Jam)		0:33
2.	"Hate to See Me Have Shit"	T.C.; Big Reg; Race; 11/5 (co.)	3:34
3.	"The Nade" (featuring Iceman)	T.C.; Big Reg; Race; 11/5 (co.)	3:04
4.	"I Got Bitchez" (featuring One Tyme)	T.C.; Big Reg; Race; 11/5 (co.)	4:39
5.	"Milk-A-Bitch" (featuring Nia and Race)	T.C.; Big Reg; Race; 11/5 (co.)	3:40
6.	"My Hoe's Name Is Nina" (featuring Baldhead Rick)	T.C.; Big Reg; Race; 11/5 (co.)	4:12
7.	"Dope Tales"	T.C.; Big Reg; Race; 11/5 (co.)	3:11
8.	"The "G" That I Be" (featuring Dush Tray, Fly Nate Tha Banksta and Big Mack)	T.C.; Big Reg; Race; 11/5 (co.)	3:51
9.	"Slangin' Dope" (featuring Race)	T.C.; Big Reg; Race; 11/5 (co.)	3:50
10.	"3 Grams of Right" (featuring Natisha Anderson and Lacresha Parker)	T.C.; Big Reg; Race; 11/5 (co.)	4:06
11.	"My Nigga Told You"	Mr. Laid; Chill Black	3:41
12.	"When I Be All Alone" (featuring Big Reg)	T.C.; Big Reg; Race; 11/5 (co.)	3:37
13.	"My Hustle"	T.C.; Big Reg; Race; 11/5 (co.)	3:34
14.	"115 CC's (The Injection)" (featuring Big Mack, Baby Menace and T-Lowe)	T.C.; Big Reg; Race; 11/5 (co.)	5:06
Total length:			50:38

== Charts ==
Chart (1996)	Peak position
US Top R&B/Hip-Hop Albums (Billboard)	33
US Heatseekers Albums (Billboard)	22
