= Velvet City =

Studio album by Latino Velvet
- Released: May 23, 2000
- Genres: West Coast hip-hop; hip-hop; gangsta rap; Chicano rap
- Length: 61:17
- Label: Celeb Entertainment
- Producers: Bosko; Dave Fore; Ferg; Massive; Philly Blunt; Shorty B

Latino Velvet chronology
Latino Velvet Project (1997)	Velvet City (2000)	Velvetism (2002)

Jay Tee chronology
Slightly Pimpish/Mostly Doggish (2000)	Velvet City (2000)	The Knocks 1992–2000 (2001)

Velvet City is the second studio album by American hip-hop supergroup Latino Velvet. It was released May 23, 2000 on Celeb. Entertainment. The group is composed of Jay Tee, Baby Beesh, Frost and Don Cisco. The album was produced by Bosko, Dee 4, Ferg, Massive and Philly Blunt. It features several guest performers, including: E-40, Levitti, Rappin' 4-Tay, D.B.A. and Candi of Mary Jane Girls. D.B.A. (Doing Business As...) was another newly formed West Coast supergroup composed of Bosko, Cool Nutz and Poppa L.Q.

== Critical reception ==
Professional ratings
Review scores
Source	Rating
RapReviews	7/10 stars

Matthias Jost of RapReviews wrote: "At its core Latino Velvet is still mostly Jay Tee and Baby Beesh who display a very similar style and mindframe. Their tight chemistry makes up for the fact that Frost and Cisco are featured only on a minority of the cuts...If you like to sit back and contemplate your own hustle, this should be the album of your choice..."

== Track listing ==
1. "Holla What's up" (featuring D.B.A.) – 3:42
2. "Fo Sho" (featuring E-40 & Remixx) – 5:00
3. "Scrilla Scratch" (engineered by Dave Fore)– 3:41
4. "Telly" (featuring Levitti) – 4:08
5. "Don't Need No Love" – 3:48
6. "Mira Mira" – 3:38
7. "Handle My Business" – 4:16
8. "Just Because" (featuring Mad One & Mr. G) – 3:38
9. "Can't Give Up" (featuring Remixx) – 4:18
10. "We Ride Vogues" (produced/engineered by Dave Fore)– 4:06
11. "Velvet City" (featuring Candi) – 4:26
12. "Perk Wit Us" – 3:29
13. "All Nighters" – 3:36
14. "Candi Coated" (featuring Rappin' 4-Tay & Candi) – 5:07
15. "Crazy Love" (featuring Remixx) – 4:23
