= Kill the Rhythm (Like a Homicide) =

- 2005 reissue cover

Studio album by Just-Ice
- Released: November 21, 1995
- Recorded: 1995
- Studio: Unique Recording Studios (New York, NY); Quad Recording Studios (New York, NY); Mark V Studios (San Francisco, CA)
- Genre: Hip hop
- Length: 48:08
- Label: In-A-Minute
- Producer: Big Ed; DJ Prince Ice; Forty Duce; KRS-One; Mark V; O.C. Rodriguez; The Scratch God

Just-Ice chronology
Gun Talk (1993)	Kill the Rhythm (Like a Homicide) (1995)	VII (1998)

Professional ratings
Review scores
Source	Rating
AllMusic	2/5 stars

Kill the Rhythm (Like a Homicide) is the sixth studio album by American rapper Just-Ice. It was released on November 21, 1995, via Sleeping Dawg/In-A-Minute Records. Recording sessions took place at Unique Recording Studios and Quad Recording Studios in New York, and Mark V Studios in San Francisco. Production was handled by O.C. Rodriguez, Big Ed, Forty Duce, The Scratch God, KRS-One, Mark V and DJ Prince Ice.

== Track listing ==
No.	Title	Writer(s)	Producer(s)	Length
1.	"Bad Boy Back (In Town)"	Joseph Williams Jr.; Lawrence Parker	KRS-One	4:05
2.	"Bring 'Em Back Alive"	Williams Jr.; Oscar Rodriguez Jr.; Julio Martinez; Ahmad Wyatt	O.C. Rodriguez; 40 Duce; The Scratch God	3:48
3.	"Ladies 'Nuff Respect"	Williams Jr.; Rodriguez Jr.; Martinez	O.C. Rodriguez; 40 Duce	4:09
4.	"Keep It Real"	Williams Jr.; Rodriguez Jr.; Wyatt	O.C. Rodriguez; The Scratch God	4:47
5.	"Stay the Hell Away from Me!"	Williams Jr.; Rodriguez Jr.; Martinez; Wyatt	O.C. Rodriguez; 40 Duce; The Scratch God	4:22
6.	"Cenci"	Williams Jr.; Parker	KRS-One	5:34
7.	"Livin' in Lockdown"	Williams Jr.; Ed Moore	Big Ed	6:14
8.	"Free Style No. 1"	Williams Jr.; Mark Velasco	Mark V	5:18
9.	"Free Style No. 2"	Williams Jr.; Velasco	Mark V	4:31
10.	"It's On"	Williams Jr.; Moore	Big Ed	5:29
11.	"Kill the Rhythm (Like a Homicide)"	Williams Jr.; Richard Alveran	DJ Prince Ice; Big Ed	5:11
Total length:				48:08

== Personnel ==
- Joseph "Just-Ice" Williams Jr. – vocals
- Mayhem – additional vocals (track 7)
- Richard "D.J. Prince Ice" Alveran – scratches (tracks: 7, 10), producer & mixing (track 11)
- Lawrence "KRS-One" Parker – producer & mixing (tracks: 1, 6)
- Oscar C. Rodriguez Jr. – producer (tracks: 2–5), mixing (tracks: 2, 5)
- Julio "Deuce" Martinez – producer (tracks: 2, 3, 5)
- Ahmad "The Scratch God" Wyatt – producer (tracks: 2, 4, 5)
- "Big Ed" Moore – producer & mixing (tracks: 7, 10, 11)
- Mark Velasco – producer & mixing (tracks: 8, 9), engineering (tracks: 7–11)
- Tony Smalios – engineering (tracks: 1–5)
- Kenny Ortiz – engineering (track 6)
- Lil Man Steve – editing (track 5)
