= After the Drama =

Studio album by 11/5
- Released: September 11, 2001
- Recorded: 2001
- Genre: Gangsta rap, West Coast hip hop
- Label: Dogday, Priority, Capitol
- Producer: Maine-O, Taytaday, Hennesy

11/5 chronology
Bootlegs & G-Sides, Vol. 2 (2000)	After the Drama (2001)

After the Drama is the sixth and final album released by rap group, 11/5. It was released on September 11, 2001 for Dogday, Priority and Capitol Records and was produced by the three members of the group, Maine-O, TayDaTay and Hennessy.

== Track listing ==
1. "After the Drama" – 3:56
2. "Top Billin" – 4:02
3. "Mob House" – 4:03
4. "Destiny" – 3:18
5. "On tha Block" – 2:59
6. "It's Nothin" – 3:37
7. "Slowdown Baby" – 3:40
8. "Who Am I?" feat. Maine-O – 3:13
9. "Shot Calla" – 4:45
10. "Smoke Signal" – 3:47
11. "Guerilla Pimpin'" – 3:17
12. "2-4-1" – 3:28
13. "Block Buster" – 3:47
