= Slightly Pimpish/Mostly Doggish =

Hip-hop album featuring Jay Tee and guests

Studio album by N2Deep
- Released: May 16, 2000
- Recorded: 1999–2000
- Genres: West Coast hip-hop, gangsta rap, hip-hop, rap, Chicano rap
- Length: 57:00
- Label: Swerve Records
- Producers: Jay Tee, Ken Franklin, Philly Blunt, Dave Fore

N2Deep chronology
| The Best of N2Deep (1999) | Slightly Pimpish/Mostly Doggish (2000) | Unreleased Game 1993: The Lost Album (2002) |

Jay Tee chronology
| The Best of N2Deep (1999) | Slightly Pimpish/Mostly Doggish (2000) | Velvet City (2000) |

Slightly Pimpish/Mostly Doggish is the fifth studio album and eighth album overall released by N2Deep. Although this album was released under the name N2Deep it is actually a Jay Tee solo album as TL does not participate on this project. The album was released in 2000 for Swerve Records and was produced by Jay Tee, Philly Blunt and Ken Franklin. Latino Velvet (a rap group consisting of Jay Tee, Frost, Baby Beesh and Don Cisco), PSD and Mac Dre all make guest appearances on this album.

== Track listing ==
1. "Intro"- :54
2. "I Am" 4:26
3. "Act a Fool" (featuring Mac Dre & PSD)- 3:16
4. "Turn It into Somethin'"- 4:22
5. "Ride Greyhound"- :34
6. "Playa 4 Life"- 4:39
7. "Congratulations" (featuring Baby Beesh & Merciless)- 3:13
8. "Back'n Tha Day"- 3:26
9. "Howda"- 4:13
10. "Perro"- 4:14
11. "Summertime in the City" (featuring ODM)- 3:46
12. "Game Tight" (featuring Young Dru)- 4:04
13. "Maria" (featuring Latino Velvet)- 3:40
14. "Little Bit of Head" (featuring Kripto)- 3:56
15. "Get High" (featuring Young Dru & Young Neen)- 4:11
16. "I'm from Vallejo Playa" (produced and engineered by Dave Fore)- 4:06
