= Ruthless by Law =

Studio album by RBL Posse
- Released: November 15, 1994
- Recorded: 1993–94
- Studio: Bayview Productions (Richmond, CA)
- Genre: West Coast hip hop; gangsta rap; G-funk; hardcore hip hop; underground hip hop
- Length: 1:01:08
- Label: In-A-Minute
- Producer: Tony Jackson (exec.); Cellski; RBL Posse; The Enhancer

RBL Posse chronology
A Lesson to Be Learned (1992)	Ruthless by Law (1994)	An Eye for an Eye (1997)

Professional ratings
Review scores
Source	Rating
AllMusic	4/5 stars

Ruthless by Law is the second studio album by American hip hop group RBL Posse. It was released on November 15, 1994, via In-A-Minute Records. Recording sessions took place at Bayview Productions in Richmond, California. Production was handled by Cellski, The Enhancer, and RBL Posse, with Tony Jackson serving as executive producer. It features guest appearances from Cellski and Herm. The album peaked at number 197 on the Billboard 200, number 23 on the Top R&B/Hip-Hop Albums and number three on the Heatseekers Albums chart in the United States.

It is the group's last album featuring member Mr. Cee as he was shot nine times and killed near his home on Harbor Road on New Year's Day 1996. It was their final project for In-A-Minute Records label.

In 2014, it was placed at number 49 on Vibe magazine ’94 Week: The 50 Best Rap Albums Of 1994 list.

== Track listing ==
No.	Title	Writer(s)	Producer(s)	Length
1.	"Bounce to This" (featuring Cellski)	Christopher Matthews; Hubert "Kyle" Church III; Marcel Wade	Cellski	5:14
2.	"Blue Bird"	Matthews; Church III	RBL Posse; The Enhancer^{[c]}	3:48
3.	"I Got My Nine"	Matthews; Church III	RBL Posse	5:51
4.	"FunkDaFied"	Matthews; Church III	RBL Posse	3:14
5.	"Listen to My Creep"	Matthews; Church III; Ricky Herd	RBL Posse	3:17
6.	"The Sound"	Matthews; Church III	Cellski	3:24
7.	"M.N.O.H.P."	Church III; Matthews; Wade; Herd	RBL Posse	5:07
8.	"Livin That Life"	Church III; Matthews	Cellski; The Enhancer	6:07
9.	"Niggas on the Jock"	Matthews; Church III	RBL Posse	3:14
10.	"Feels Good to Be a Gangsta"	Matthews; Church III	RBL Posse; Cellski^{[c]}	3:48
11.	"Pass the Zigzags"	Herd; Matthews; Church III	RBL Posse	5:10
12.	"Smoke a Blunt"	Matthews; Church III	RBL Posse	3:48
13.	"Dedication (Bitch or a Hoe)"	Matthews; Church III	RBL Posse	3:31
14.	"Still Ain't Learned"	Matthews; Church III	RBL Posse	3:50
15.	"Herm Outro (The Message)" (featuring Herm)	Andre Herm Lewis	The Enhancer	1:45
Total length:				1:01:08

Notes

- ^{^[c]} signifies a co-producer.

== Personnel ==
- Christopher "Black-C" Matthews – vocals, keyboards (tracks: 2, 4, 7, 9, 11–13), producer, mixing
- Kyle "Mr. Cee" Church – vocals, keyboards (tracks: 5, 12, 14), producer, mixing
- Ricky "Hitman" Herd – vocals (tracks: 5, 7, 11)
- Marcel "Cellski" Wade – vocals (tracks: 1, 7), keyboards & producer (tracks: 1, 6, 8), co-producer (track 10)
- Andre "Herm" Lewis – vocals (track 15)
- Don "The Enhancer" Marsh – keyboards (tracks: 1–5, 7, 9, 11–15), producer (tracks: 8, 15), co-producer (track 2), mixing
- Dravail – backing vocals (tracks: 4, 11, 13)
- Andre "Baba" Mathews – backing vocals (track 11)
- Audrey Jones – backing vocals (track 11)
- Tomie "T.C." Witherspoon – mixing
- Ken Lee – mastering
- Tony Jackson – executive producer
- Victor Hall – photography, layout

== Charts ==
Chart (1994)	Peak position
US Billboard 200	197
US Top R&B Albums (Billboard)	23
US Heatseekers Albums (Billboard)	3
