= So Cold (album) =

Studio album by Jay Tee
- Released: June 12, 2001
- Genres: West Coast hip-hop, Chicano rap
- Length: 70:33
- Label: 40 Ounce Records

Jay Tee chronology
The Knocks 1992–2000 (2001)	So Cold (2001)	Velvetism (2002)

So Cold is Jay Tee's first solo album released under his own name.

== Track listing ==
1. "Ha Naw"
2. "She Gon' Hate This" (featuring E-40)
3. "Call Me" (featuring Mr. Kee & Don Cisco)
4. "So Cold"
5. "Shake Yo' Thang" (featuring Luniz)
6. "I Got What You Like" (featuring Miami)
7. "West Coast"
8. "Playa Perkin'" (featuring Young Dru)
9. "You Ain't Getting Paid?" (featuring Mac Dre)
10. "Pepe Le Pew" (featuring Frost & SPM)
11. "Shots to the Dome" (featuring Don Cisco & Baby Beesh)
12. "We Run This Whole Thang" (featuring Young Dru)
13. "Bumpin'" (featuring Nino Brown & Frost)
14. "Soakin' Up My Game"
15. "Holdin' On"
16. "How'd You Do Me Like That"
