= Just-Ice =

American rapper

- Born: Joseph Williams, Jr; June 22, 1965 (age 61)
- Origin: The Bronx, New York, U.S.
- Genres: Hip hop, East coast hip hop, Old-school hip hop, Hardcore hip hop
- Years active: 1986–present
- Labels: Fresh/Sleeping Bag Records; Savage/BMG Records; Warlock Records

Joseph Williams Jr. (born June 22, 1965), better known by the stage name Just-Ice, is an American rapper from New York City.

== Career ==
In 1986, he was charged with the murder of drug dealer Ludlaw DeSouza, but later proven innocent. His third album, The Desolate One (1989), had minor success in the United Kingdom, reaching no. 16 on the UK Independent Chart.

Williams relocated from the Ft. Greene area in Brooklyn to the Castle Hill section of the Bronx in his early adolescent years. He currently resides in the Bronx which he considers his hometown.

Bradley Nowell (Sublime) brought Just-Ice's vinyl record The Desolate One to KROQ 106.7 FM Radio Station in California in the 1990s at the height of the band's success. He proclaimed that "You can drop the needle anywhere on this record and I guarantee you, GOLD!" Of which, the DJ allowed and played "NA TOUCH DA JUST", which Nowell would later sample in Sublime's cover of "Smoke Two Joints".

== Discography ==
- Back to the Old School (1986)
- Kool & Deadly (1987)
- The Desolate One (1989)
- Masterpiece (1990)
- Gun Talk (1993)
- Kill the Rhythm (Like a Homicide) (1995)
- VII (1998)
- Gangster Boogie (2008) (digital download only)
- 32 Degrees (2009) (digital download only)
- The Just-Ice and KRS-One EP Vol.1 (2010) (digital download only)
