= RBL Posse =

American hip hop group

- Also known as: Ruthless by Law
- Origin: Hunters Point, San Francisco, California
- Genre: Gangsta rap
- Years active: 1991–present
- Labels: In-A-Minute, Big Beat, The Rightway Productions
- Members: Black C
- Past members: Mr. Cee; Hitman
- Website: rblposse.com

RBL Posse is an American gangsta rap group from the Hunters Point neighborhood in San Francisco, California. The members were Black C, Mr. Cee, and Hitman. The only surviving member is Black C.

== History ==
RBL Posse was formed in 1991 by Black C (Christian Mathews) and Mr. Cee (Kyle Church). Their first release, the self-produced "Don't Give Me No Bammer" came out on In-a-Minute Records and made the Billboard magazine Hot Rap Singles chart, peaking at #16. Two albums followed: A Lesson to Be Learned released in 1992, which peaked at #60 on the Billboard magazine Top R&B/Hip-Hop Albums chart, and Ruthless by Law released in 1994, which surpassed their debut by making it to #23, and also made The Billboard 200 at #197. In 1995, the group produced a solo record for group member Hitman (Ricky Herd) called Solo Creep.

Their impressive sales for regional indie releases attracted interest from Atlantic Records subsidiary Big Beat, which signed the group. Before they could deliver an album, Mr. Cee was shot nine times and killed near his home on Harbor Road on New Year's Day 1996. This murder set off a wave of retaliation killings in this section of the city. Black C also lost an eye in 1988 during the San Francisco gang wars in a drive-by shooting.

Black C and Hitman filled the void created by Mr. Cee's absence with various producers, including Rick Rock and MC Eiht, and released An Eye for an Eye in 1997. Musician and Co-producer Shannon Lacy whom also wrote and performed the instrumentation on "Strictly this game". The album peaked at #70 on The Billboard 200 chart and got as high as #14 on the Top R&B/Hip-Hop Albums chart.

Another Hitman solo record was released in 1999, and in 2000, RBL Posse released a double album—Bootlegs and Bay Shit: The Resume. In May 2001, Hitman was shot in the leg in a gang-related shooting.

On February 3, 2003, Hitman was shot in the head while driving at the intersection of Whitney Young Circle and Hudson Avenue in the San Francisco's Hunters Point neighborhood; he died in hospital. 2001's Hostile Takeover proved to be the group's last album before Hitman's death.

Black C, the only surviving member of the group, has continued to release solo albums and RBL Posse-related material.

== Discography ==
=== Studio albums ===
- A Lesson To Be Learned (1992)
- Ruthless By Law (1994)
- An Eye For An Eye (1997)
- Hostile Takeover (2001)
- A Lesson To Be Learned (Refreshed) (with DJ.Fresh) (2023)

=== Compilation albums ===
- Bootlegs & Bay Shit: The Resume (2000)
- 20th Anniversary (2012)
- The Bong Show (Volume 1) (2014)

=== Solo albums ===
- Hitman – Solo Creep (1995)
- Hitman – H2O Volume One (1999)
- Black C & Taydatay – Prime Factorz (2000)
- Black C – Last Man Standing (2003)
- Black C – The City Of Gods (2007)
- Black C – 70s Baby (2010)
- Black C – Still Ruthless (2012)
- Black C – Black Caesar (2021)
- Black C – The Black Album (2023)
- Black C & Joe Fresco – Ruthless (2023)
- Black C – Heavy In It (2024)
- Black C & DJ Idea - Sumthin’ 2 Mobb 2 (2025)
- Black C & Keak Da Sneak - 3X Ruthless (2026)

=== Other releases ===
- RBL Posse Presents: N.O.H. Mafia – Niggaz on High (1996)
- Mr. Sandman – 10% Love Me 90% Hate Me EP (1997)
- RBL Posse Presents: Prime Minister – No Compromise (2002)
- RBL Posse Presents: Military Minded – Ghetto Vietnam (2002)
- RBL Posse Presents: The Rightway Malitia – Malitia Muzik (2003)
- RBL Posse Presents: Young Thugg – Thugg Livin' (2003)
