= Oceanview, San Francisco =

Oceanview
- Neighborhood
- Location within San Francisco
- Coordinates: 37.7144°N 122.4567°W
- Country: United States
- State: California
- City and county: San Francisco

Government
  - Supervisor: Chyanne Chen
  - Assemblymember: Catherine Stefani (D)
  - State senator: Scott Wiener (D)
  - United States Representatives: Kevin Mullin (D) and Nancy Pelosi (D)

Area
  - Total: 0.308 sq mi (0.80 km^{2})

Population
  - Total: 7,010
  - Density: 22,800/sq mi (8,790/km^{2})
- Time zone: UTC-8 (Pacific)
  - Summer (DST): UTC-7 (PDT)
- ZIP code: 94112
- Area codes: 415/628

Oceanview is a neighborhood in the southern portion of San Francisco, California. It was first established as a community in the 1910s and originally centered on the intersection of Sagamore Street and San Jose Avenue. Today, the neighborhood is bordered by Orizaba Avenue to the west, Lakeview Avenue to the north, and Interstate 280 to the south and east.

Ingleside and the Ocean Avenue campus of City College lie north of Oceanview; Cayuga Terrace is to the east; Daly City, California, and the Outer Mission are south; and Merced Heights is to the west.

Oceanview Playground and Minnie and Lovie Ward Recreation Center are located in the middle of the neighborhood, a two-square-block area between Plymouth Avenue, Capitol Avenue, Lobos Street, and Montana Street. The Ocean View Branch Library of the San Francisco Public Library is located at 345 Randolph St. Ocean View is served by Muni Metro Routes M, 29 and 54.

== History ==
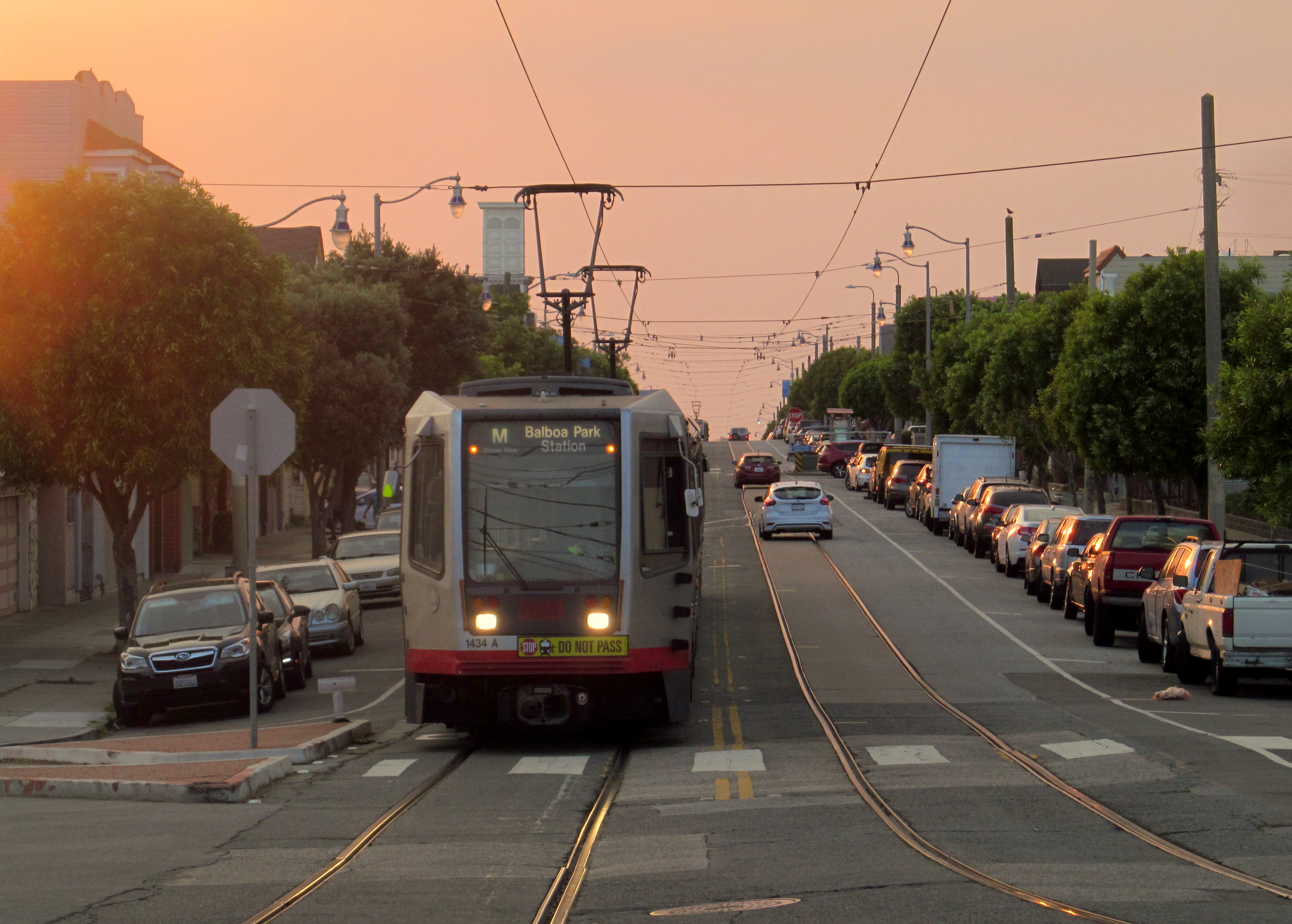
An M Ocean View train on Broad Street

Oceanview, also referred to as "Lakeview" by some natives of the community, has a rich history. Oceanview was originally an Italian-Irish-German neighborhood in the mid- to late nineteenth century; the location acted as a station for train service between San Francisco and San Jose, owned by San Francisco and San Jose Railroad, bought by Southern Pacific in 1868.

Post World War II Oceanview was one of the few places in San Francisco where African-American families could buy property. During redevelopment in the Western Addition/Fillmore neighborhood in the 1960s and 1970s by the San Francisco Redevelopment Agency, more African-American families moved to the neighborhood from the Western Addition and Bayview neighborhoods. Until the mid-1990s, African Americans accounted for over 50 percent of the neighborhood's residents. In the early 2000s, lower real estate prices relative to the rest of the city brought in a new influx of Asians, Latinos, and Caucasians, making Oceanview one of the most culturally diverse neighborhoods in San Francisco.

At one point in time there was a lake on Geneva Ave, down the slope from the eastern side of Oceanview. Lake view refers not to Lake Merced, but the former Lake Geneva. The creek coursed through this canyon and by Glen Park and then through what is now Bosworth Street until it reached the bottom, over which Mission Street viaduct is built. The other source is about where Cayuga Avenue and Regent Street intersect. Its channel was what is now Cayuga Avenue and joined the other branch under the Mission Street viaduct. The creek widened between Niagara and Geneva Avenues to form what was known as Lake Geneva.

== Demographics ==
Partly due to fairly recent waves of gentrification in the past decade, Oceanview is more ethnically and economically diverse than San Francisco as a whole. Asians now hold majority status in the once predominantly-African American enclave. Although no longer a majority in the neighborhood as in the 1960s-1990s, many blocks abutting the Broad-Randolph Street corridor remain 50% or more African-American in residency. As of the early 2010s, the block off of Orizaba Avenue and Garfield Street is 54% black, the highest concentration of Oceanview. As of the 2010 census, Oceanview is 44.68% Asian, 22.99% African American, 20.36% Caucasian and 14.1% Latino.

The demographic character of the OMI neighborhoods began to change after World War II. Many African-Americans, who had migrated to the Bay Area for work during the war, secured good-paying jobs and settled permanently in new homes in Ingleside, Merced Heights and Oceanview when the war ended. In 1950, African-Americans made up 5% of the population in the Ingleside, Merced Heights and Oceanview census tracts, and by 1970 the percentage had increased to 62%.

Fueled by vacant land in Merced Heights and Oceanview, the post-war housing boom, the desire to own their own homes, and the already significant presence of African-Americans in the neighborhoods, the black population exploded from 1950 to 1960. By 1960, African-Americans made up 40% of Merced Heights, 32% of Ingleside and 59% of Oceanview. While some whites moved out, generally to suburban tracts heavily marketed to them, the number of blacks living in OMI increased twelvefold (from 602 in 1950 to 7,273 in 1960), while the citywide black population less than doubled (43,000 in 1950 to 74,000 in 1960).

There is anecdotal evidence that African-Americans moved to the OMI after being displaced by the first phase of urban renewal in the Western Addition (the A-1 Project) in the late 1950s. Relocation records, while incomplete, show that the vast majority of displaced residents of the Western Addition found nearby accommodations. Of the 3,700 households of all races (family and single households) living in the project area in 1957, about 2,010 moved without relocation assistance and to unknown whereabouts. Of the remaining 1,602, 67% moved to other parts of the Western Addition and only 2.6%, or 34 households, moved to the West of Twin Peaks area.

By 1970, the OMI had matured into a middle-class district of single-family, owner-occupied homes. Seventy-six percent of the land area in the Ingleside, Oceanview, and Merced Heights neighborhoods was residential (100% was residential in Ingleside Terraces), compared with 39% citywide. The housing stock was overwhelming single family (95% vs. 68% citywide) and owner- occupied (72% vs. 31% citywide), while the population was mostly African American (63% compared with 13% citywide). In recent years, the OMI has witnessed an influx of Asian-American and other ethnic groups, making it one of San Francisco's most diverse neighborhoods. The OMI is more Hispanic, Black, and Asian than San Francisco as a whole.

== Pre-2000 marginalization and crime ==
Oceanview has been described as "hard to find" due to its location situated in between two freeways in the far southwestern outskirts of San Francisco. Passenger service on the train line that established the area ended in 1904, causing business development to decline in Oceanview. Post World War II, African-Americans were encouraged to buy property in the declining district, finding less discrimination and lower cost older average age homes throughout the area. The neighborhood began to show signs of neglect and deterioration by the 1960s. By the early 1970s Oceanview had become an African American-majority neighborhood, representing over 50% of the residents. The balance of the neighborhood residency consisted of African Americans, Asians, Latinos, and Pacific Islanders, with fewer Caucasians residing in the district.

By the 1980s after years of widespread civic neglect, the Oceanview neighborhood declined into one of San Francisco's most crime-ridden districts. A geographically remote, socially isolated, majority-black population of displaced blue collar workers endured an environment rife with unemployment and relative poverty. These socioeconomic factors transformed the working-class neighborhood, resulting in drug trade and gang activity. Notably, the primary neighborhood corridors Broad and Randolph streets became a dangerously active open-air drug market. These streets were marked by high concentrations of liquor stores and shuttered former businesses.

One year, 12 homicides occurred at a single Oceanview intersection. Despite the neighborhood's high crime rates, local news media paid little attention to Oceanview compared to other lower-income dangerous high crime neighborhoods in San Francisco such as Bayview-Hunters Point.

Historically, the bulk of the murders that occurred in Oceanview were killings connected to the once thriving local drug trade in the community. Murders were also the outcome of armed combat between mostly young African-American men involved in local loosely organized gangs of childhood friends from opposing rival "turfs", or majority-black low-income neighborhoods and or public housing projects, throughout San Francisco including Randolph Street in Oceanview as well as the Sunnydale projects on the fringe of the Visitacion Valley neighborhood and the Western Addition, locally known as the Fillmore district. These locally based gangs of mostly young male minorities involved in the criminal lifestyle of San Francisco often did not refer to themselves as actual gangs as there was no hierarchy, strict organization, recruiting or getting "jumped in" associated with groups whose main camaraderie was based on claiming their neighborhood, block or public housing projects. Young African-American men involved in local turf gangs or "mobs" in Oceanview, as well as most predominantly African-American areas of San Francisco and much of Bay Area seldom adopted the Blood and Crip nationwide gang culture that was founded in 1970s Los Angeles.

Concurrently, in the late 1980s and 1990s, Oceanview became a hub for independently produced local underground Gangsta Rap, known in the Bay Area as Mob music. During this time, young men from the local area began articulating the harsher realities of growing up in the neighborhood through Rap music. Thus detailing the violent street crime that plagued the district as well as voicing their unsettling daily struggles while living in Oceanview. Many Bay Area Rap pioneers such as the late Cougnut and Cellski hailed from the neighborhood, some from the public housing project at Randolph and Head streets along the area's main corridor.

== Gentrification and revitalization ==
By the early 2000s, serious incidents of violent crime had decreased significantly in Oceanview. The efforts of a neighborhood group of community activists called Neighbors In Action and the local police force had effectively curbed the street crime associated with drug dealing and gang activity that had blighted the area for decades. Most notably, long-time Oceanview resident Minnie Ward helped spearhead the changes in Oceanview by working hard in community activism with her husband to reverse Oceanview's then increasing degradation in the early 1990s.

Both Minnie (d. 2005) and husband Lovie (d. 2003) were honored when the Oceanview Park recreation center was rebuilt and renamed the Minnie and Lovie Ward Recreational Center. The renaming commemorated the couple's contributions to cleaning up the Oceanview neighborhood. A new library opened on 345 Randolph Street in June 2000, replacing an older and markedly smaller reading room type library that was located at 111 Broad Street. At 117 Broad, Engine Co. No. 33, an architecturally restored 1890s Victorian firehouse offers riding tours on an antique fire engine throughout San Francisco.

Few new businesses have also opened along the residential neighborhoods' once downtrodden Broad-Randolph commercial strip. In 2021, high-end Asian grocery chain H Mart opened its first store in San Francisco inside the OceanView Village Shopping Center, taking over the space of another grocery store that closed nearly a decade before.

Despite its past, Oceanview is currently, as of 2022, one of the safest neighborhoods in San Francisco, with 71% less crime than the rest of the city.

From the 2010s, many homebuyers are choosing to purchase homes in Oceanview as housing prices continue to rise annually here. From 2012 to 2013, the median sale price of a house in Oceanview increased 6.3% and the number of sales increased by 66.7%. The average square foot price of a house in Oceanview was $484, which was a 12.8% increase from the same time frame.
