= Gun Talk (album) =

Studio album by Just-Ice
- Released: March 23, 1993
- Recorded: 1992–93
- Genre: Hardcore hip hop; gangsta rap
- Length: 45:01
- Label: Savage Records; 74785-50211
- Producer: Kurtis Mantronik; O.C. Rodriguez

Just-Ice chronology
Masterpiece (1990)	Gun Talk (1993)	Kill the Rhythm (Like a Homicide) (1995)

Singles from Gun Talk
- 1. "Girls N Guns" Released: March 15, 1993

Professional ratings
Review scores
Source	Rating
AllMusic	2/5 stars
RapReviews	7/10
The Source	2.5/5 stars

Gun Talk is the fifth studio album by American hardcore hip hop recording artist Just-Ice. It was released on March 23, 1993, through Savage Records with distribution via Bertelsmann Music Group, making it the rapper's only album to have major-label distribution. Production was handled by Kurtis Mantronik, O.C. Rodriguez and Charlie Chase, with The Scratch God and Steve Sanchez serving as co-producers. The album peaked at number 67 on the Top R&B/Hip-Hop Albums chart in the United States, supported with Its lead single "Girls N Guns".

== Track listing ==
No.	Title	Writer(s)	Producer(s)	Length
1.	"Gangster Style Rap"	Joseph Williams Jr.; Graham Curtis el Khaleel	Kurtis Mantronik	3:13
2.	"Girls N Guns"	Williams Jr.; Khaleel	Kurtis Mantronik	4:34
3.	"It's Just-Ice Thing"	Williams Jr.; Khaleel	Kurtis Mantronik	3:32
4.	"Freestyle"	Williams Jr.; Khaleel	Kurtis Mantronik	5:48
5.	"Give Mi Pas"	Williams Jr.; Khaleel	Kurtis Mantronik	3:52
6.	"Bring 'Em Back Alive"	Williams Jr.; Oscar Rodriguez Jr.	O.C. Rodriguez; Charlie Chase	4:14
7.	"That the Way I Feel"	Williams Jr.; Rodriguez Jr.; Bobby Russell	O.C. Rodriguez; The Scratch God^{[a]}	4:59
8.	"Stay the Hell Away from Me"	Williams Jr.; Rodriguez Jr.	O.C. Rodriguez; Steve Sanchez^{[a]}	4:00
9.	"Informer Fi Dead"	Williams Jr.; Rodriguez Jr.	O.C. Rodriguez; The Scratch God^{[a]}	5:32
10.	"On the Loose"	Williams Jr.; Rodriguez Jr.	O.C. Rodriguez; The Scratch God^{[a]}	5:11
Total length:				45:01

Notes

- ^{^[a]} signifies a co-producer.

Sample credits

- Track 7 contains excerpts from "Little Green Apples" as performed by Stanley Turrentine.
- Track 8 contains elements from "Case of the P.T.A." written by Bryan Higgins, Trevor Smith, James Jackson and Sheldon Scott.
- Track 9 contains a sample from "Gee Whiz It's Christmas" written by Carla Thomas, Steve Cropper and Vincent Trauth.

== Personnel ==
- Joseph "Just-Ice" Williams Jr. – vocals
- Graham Curtis "Kurtis Mantronik" el Khaleel – producer & mixing (tracks: 1–5)
- Oscar C. Rodriguez Jr. – producer & mixing (tracks: 6–10)
- Charlie Chase – producer (track 6)
- Ahmad "The Scratch God" Wyatt – co-producer (tracks: 7, 9, 10)
- Steve Sanchez – co-producer (track 8)
- Andrew Heermans – mixing (tracks: 1–5)
- Joe Hornoff – mixing (tracks: 1–5)
- Tony Smalios – mixing (tracks: 6, 9)
- Matt Hathaway – engineering (tracks: 6, 8, 9)
- Josh Chervokas – mixing (track 7)
- Peter Robbins – engineering (track 10)
- José Rodriguez – mastering
- Ron Resnik – executive producer
- John Bellisimo – photography

== Charts ==
Chart (1993)	Peak position
US Top R&B/Hip-Hop Albums (Billboard)	67
