= The Golden State (N2Deep album) =

Studio album by N2Deep
- Released: March 25, 1997
- Recorded: 1996–1997
- Genres: West Coast hip-hop, gangsta rap, hip-hop, Chicano rap
- Length: 59:49
- Label: Swerve Records
- Producers: Dave G., Funk Daddy, Jay Tee, Johnny Z, Ken Franklin

N2Deep chronology
24-7-365 (1994)	The Golden State (1997)	The Rumble (1998)

Jay Tee chronology
N2Deep: 24-7-365 (1994)	The Golden State (1997)	Latino Velvet: Latino Velvet Project (1997)

Singles from The Golden State
- 1. "Day 2 Day Basis"; 2. "Threesome"; 3. "Parkin' Lot Pimpin'"; 4. "Cali Lifestyles"

The Golden State is the third studio album by rap group N2Deep. The album was released in 1997 on Swerve Records and was produced by Johnny Z, Jay Tee, Funk Daddy, Ken Franklin and Dave G. Four singles were included on the album: "Day 2 Day Basis", "Threesome", "Parkin' Lot Pimpin'" and "Cali Lifestyles". Guests on the album include Baby Beesh, Mary Jane Girls, Mac Dre, Dru Down and PSD.

== Track listing ==
1. "Intro"- 2:00
2. "Day 2 Day Basis"- 4:33
3. "Threesome" (featuring PSD & Mac Lee)- 3:34
4. "On Tha' Everyday" (featuring Mary Jane Girls & Ironic)- 4:28
5. "Where We Dwell" (featuring Mac Dre & Baby Beesh)- 4:30
6. "From the Town" (featuring Mac Lee)- 4:12
7. "Kick Way on Back" (featuring Baby Beesh)- 4:59
8. "Situations"- 4:27
9. "Back to the Hotel 2" (Intro by Miami)- 4:43
10. "Parkin' Lot Pimpin'" (featuring Levitti, Miami & Baby Beesh and Rube of Potna Deuce)- 5:13
11. "Cali Lifestyles" (featuring Dru Down & PSD)- 3:52
12. "T-Shirt and Panties" (featuring Baby Beesh & PSD)- 4:00
13. "Take a Ride"- 3:47
14. "Look Like a Playa"- 4:12
15. "Outro"- 1:17

== Samples ==
Day 2 Day Basis

- "Feels So Real (Won't Let Go)" by Patrice Rushen

From Tha Town

- "Brick House" by Commodores

Situations

- "Groove With You" by The Isley Brothers
