= Totally Insane =

Hip-Hop group from East Palo Alto, California

- Also known as: TI
- Origin: East Palo Alto, California
- Genre: Hip hop
- Years active: 1991–2024
- Labels: In a Minute Records, Felonious Records
- Members: Mac-10; Ad Kapone; Scoot Dogg

Totally Insane was an American hip hop group from East Palo Alto, California, whose members were Mac-10, Ad Kapone and Scoot Dogg. They were signed to In a Minute Records from 1991 to 1995.

== History ==
Phillip Allen, alias Mac-10 or Ten Dolla, and Adam Hicks, alias Ad Kapone, came together in 1991 and were signed to In-a-Minute Records. What first sparked their success was the release of the single, "No More Mr. Nice Guy." The duo's first album was 1991's Direct from the Backstreet, which peaked at #87 on the Top R&B/Hip-Hop Albums. Rapper Scoot Dogg of EPA is also a member, but joined later, and appeared on more than one album; however, he was not on every album. They would later return with two albums, 1993's Goin' Insane and 1995's Backstreet Life which peaked at #61 and #48 on the Top R&B/Hip-Hop Album chart respectively. Totally Insane would then release Totally Insane in 1998, Da Game of Life in 2001. Ad Kapone of Totally Insane was sentenced to six years in prison in 2001 for possession with intent. While Mac-10 has not yet released an album, Ad Kapone is back and has released The K Word, keeping the TIE (Totally Insane Empire) alive.

== Origin ==
Ad Kapone first met T.C. in late 1989 and recorded an album titled "Crazy Shit" in mid-1990. However, their executive producer and good friend Micheal “Mike D” Washington was gunned down in North Oakland before its release. Due to disputes and disagreements with Washington’s older brother the album was unable to be released. Kapone and T.C. instead teamed up with a new executive producer named Manny and recorded "Direct From The Backstreet" in seven days. Following its success in 1993 the two decided to create a follow-up album, "Goin' Insane".

== Signing ==
Totally Insane was introduced to Jason Blaine - the owner of In-A-Minute Records / Music People Distribution - through Master P, and were approached by him for distribution. The album "Direct From The Backstreet" was selling so many units they could not press them fast enough and Jason Blaine wanted in on the Totally Insane goldmine. So he offered the group a 5-year, 3-album deal and offered them 30 thousand dollars. They signed late 1991, and would release 3 albums and end their contract in 1995.

== Discography ==
=== Studio albums ===
- Direct from the Backstreet (1991)
- Goin' Insane (1993)
- Backstreet Life (1995)
- Totally Insane (1998)
- Da Game of Life (2001)
