= Lafayette Afro Rock Band =

Funk Rock band

- Lafayette Afro Rock Band in 1978

Background information
- Also known as: Ice; Captain Dax; Crispy & Co.
- Origin: Paris, France
- Genres: Funk
- Years active: 1970–1978
- Labels: America (1972); Musidisc (1973); Makossa (1974–1977); Superclasse (1978)
- Past members: Bobby Boyd (vocals); Larry Jones (acoustic guitar); Michael McEwan (Electric guitar); Lafayette Hudson (bass guitar); Frank Abel (keyboard); Ronnie James Buttacavoli (horns); Ernest "Donny" Donable (drums); Keno Speller (percussion); Arthur Young (horns, percussion)

Audio sample
- Darkest Light: file; help

Lafayette Afro Rock Band was an American funk band formed in Roosevelt, Long Island, New York in 1970. Shortly after their formation, they relocated to France. Though little-known in their native United States during their recording period, they have since become celebrated as one of the standout funk bands of the 1970s and are particularly noted for their use of break beats. The band also recorded under the names Ice, Crispy & Co. (Krispie & Co. in Europe), Captain Dax, and others.

Upon their relocation to Paris, the local music scene influenced the group's work, inspiring the addition of rock and African elements. They recorded their debut album as Ice and then adopted the name Lafayette Afro Rock Band. The band's next two albums, Soul Makossa and Malik, included the songs "Hihache" and "Darkest Light" which would be sampled in numerous culturally significant hip-hop compositions. They broke up in 1978.

== History ==
The group first formed as the Bobby Boyd Congress in 1970, in homage to their original vocalist Bobby Boyd. In addition to Boyd, the band included guitarist Larry Jones, bassist Lafayette Hudson, keyboardist Frank Abel, horn players Ronnie James Buttacavoli and Arthur Young, drummer Ernest "Donny" Donable, and percussionists Keno Speller and Arthur Young. Jones was later replaced by Michael McEwan. Upon deciding that the funk scene in the United States was too saturated for them to viably compete, they relocated to France in 1971. When Boyd split from the group and returned to America, the remaining band members briefly renamed themselves Soul Congress and then settled on the name Ice.

After regular performances in Paris's Barbès district, an area made up primarily of North African immigrants, they caught the eye of producer Pierre Jaubert and became the house session band at his Parisound studio. The influence of their surroundings led Ice to increasingly weave African rhyme schemes, textures, and beat tendencies into their established funk style. The album Each Man Makes His Own Destiny was released in 1972 under the name Ice, after which the band changed their name to Lafayette Afro Rock Band to reflect their expanded influences.

Now under the name Lafayette Afro Rock Band, they released the album Soul Makossa (also known as Movin' and Groovin' in the United States) in 1973. The title track was a cover version of Manu Dibango's international hit, "Soul Makossa". Though it failed to chart, the album made an impact years later. Its standout song, the oft-covered "Hihache", has been widely sampled by artists as diverse as Janet Jackson, Biz Markie, LL Cool J, De La Soul, Digital Underground, Naughty by Nature, and Wu-Tang Clan.

The band's 1975 album Malik prominently featured the Univox Super-Fuzz and liberal usage of the talk box. This album was equally influential in subsequent decades, with a sample of the song "Darkest Light" being featured prominently in Public Enemy's "Show 'Em Whatcha Got". The original saxophone solo on "Darkest Light" was played by Leroy Gomez, who later became popular as the lead singer of the disco group Santa Esmeralda. After Public Enemy's usage of the song was highly praised, samples of "Darkest Light" appeared in several more notable rap and R&B songs, including "Back to the Hotel" by N2Deep, the multi-platinum 1992 single "Rump Shaker" by Wreckx-n-Effect, and the 2006 single "Show Me What You Got" by Jay-Z.

Mal Waldron, an American jazz and world music composer best known as the long-time accompanist for Billie Holiday, collaborated with Lafayette Afro Rock Band in 1975, employing them to back him on his unreleased Candy Girl album. Shortly later, blues pianist Sunnyland Slim sought out the band's services, resulting in the collaborative album Depression Blues. The group subsequently reverted to the Ice moniker and also used the names Captain Dax and Crispy & Co. on various releases. The 1975 album Tonight at the Discotheque was released as a "various artists" compilation but actually consisted of songs recorded by the same band under multiple monikers.

They released 1976 funky disco single "Dr. Beezar, Soul Frankenstein" under the name Captain Dax in Japan. The band members returned to America and broke up in 1978. Later that year, French record label Superclasse released the album Afon: Ten Unreleased Afro Funk Recordings. In 1999 the same label released Darkest Light: The Best of Lafayette Afro Rock Band, which rekindled interest in the group two decades after they disbanded. More compilations followed, including The Ultimate Collection in 2001, and the 2016 album Afro Funk Explosion! The latter was released under the name "Lafayette Afro Rock Band vs. Ice" and includes songs originally released under those two names plus Crispy & Co. and Captain Dax.

== Reception ==
Lafayette Afro Rock Band toiled in obscurity during their years of activity, but have become of interest to critics and music historians due to their characteristic break beats, which in turn influenced future hip-hop and R&B artists. Due to their obscurity, when compared to their contemporaries like Cameo, Funkadelic, or Kool & The Gang, few copies of their studio albums have survived. With the exception of the commonly-sampled songs "Hihache" and "Darkest Light", reviewers and historians have devoted their attention to more recent compilation albums. Music historian Dave Thompson unfavorably reviewed Afon: Ten Unreleased Afro Funk Recordings (1978) as "uninspiring", but praised Darkest Light: The Best of Lafayette Afro Funk Band (1999) as the "ultimate point of entry" for the band. That album also received a flattering review from Melody Maker. AllMusic critic Jason Ankeny has also favorably reviewed the 1999 compilation, stating that it is "one of the great documents of classic funk." The Ultimate Collection (2001) received particular acclaim from AllMusic writer Jason Birchmeier, who asserted that it was "a gem" that "you can't go wrong with." Afro Funk Explosion! (2016) also received positive reviews, with AllMusic's Thom Jurek calling it "essential for fans of '70s funk and musically on par with the best of Mandrill, War, and Osibisa."

== Discography ==
=== Studio albums ===
- Each Man Makes His Own Destiny (1973, as Ice)
- Soul Makossa (1973, as Lafayette Afro Rock Band)
- Voodounon (EP, 1974, as Lafayette Afro Rock Band)
- Nino and Radiah (1974, as Ice, backing Nino Ferrer)
- Malik (1975, as Lafayette Afro Rock Band)
- Tonight at the Discotheque (1975, as "Various Artists")
- Funky Flavored (1976, as Crispy & Co.)
- Frisco Disco (1976, as Ice)
- Afro Agban (1977, as Ice)

=== Singles ===
- "Oglenon" (1974, as Lafayette Afro Rock Band)
- "Brazil" (1975, as Crispy & Co.)
- "A.I.E. (A Mwana)" (1975, as Ice)
- "Get It Together" (1975, as Crispy & Co.)
- "Sunara" (1976, as Crispy & Co.)
- "Dr. Beezar, Soul Frankenstein" (1976, as Captain Dax)

=== Compilations ===
- Afon: Ten Unreleased Afro Funk Recordings (1978)
- Darkest Light: The Best of Lafayette Afro Rock Band (1999)
- The Ultimate Collection (2001)
- Afro Funk Explosion! (2016)

== Selected samples ==
Song	Sampling recording
"Hihache" (1974)	"Nobody Beats the Biz" by Biz Markie (1988); "Jingling Baby" by LL Cool J (1989); "No Delayin'" by Nice & Smooth (1989); "Ghetto Bastard" by Naughty by Nature (1991); "No Nose Job (Remix)" by Digital Underground (1991); "Oodles of O's" by De La Soul (1991); "Alright" by Kris Kross (1993); "Buck Em Down" by Black Moon (1993); It's For You - Shanice (1993); "Wu-Tang Clan Ain't Nuthing ta F' Wit" by Wu-Tang Clan (1993); "2 Cups of Blood" by Gravediggaz (1994); Angela Winbush - Treat U Rite (1994); "Hand on My Nutsac" by Coolio (1994); "Build & Destroy" by Channel Live (1995); "This Is How We Do It" by Montell Jordan (1995)
"Darkest Light" (1975)	"Show 'Em Whatcha Got" by Public Enemy (1988); "Soul Food" by Tuff Crew (1989); "Justa Lil' Dope" by Masters at Work (1991); "Back to the Hotel" by N2Deep (1992); "Back against the Wall" by Three Six Mafia (1995); "Rump Shaker by Wreckx-n-Effect (1992); "You Can't See What I See" by Heavy D & the Boyz (1996); "Freestyle Noize" by Freestylers (1998); "Mad Love" by Britney Spears (2001); "introduction" by Idéal J; "Show Me What You Got" by Jay-Z (2006); "Friday" by Ice Cube (1995); "Slow Down" by VanJess (2021); "Know Better" by Janelle Monáe (2023)
