= Cougnut =

American rapper

Background information
- Also known as: Cougar Rebel
- Born: Ronald Fields Jr. January 11, 1968; San Francisco, California
- Origin: San Francisco, California
- Died: September 4, 2001 (aged 33) Daly City, California
- Genres: West Coast hip hop; gangsta rap
- Occupation: Rapper
- Years active: 1989–2001
- Label: In-A-Minute Records
- Formerly of: I.M.P

Ronald Fields (January 11, 1968 – September 4, 2001), better known by his stage name Cougnut, was an American rapper from the Lakeview neighborhood of San Francisco, California.

== Biography ==
As frontman of rap group Ill Mannered Posse (I.M.P), and later as solo artist, Fields was known for his dark raspy voice and street credibility. His best known release as a member of I.M.P. is probably the 1996 album Ill Mannered Playas, which was released through In-A-Minute Records. Often requested for compilations and features, Fields was one of the most prominent rappers in the Bay Area in his prime (from 1993 until his death in 2001). Notable artists Fields worked with JT The Bigga Figga, Master P, Andre Nickatina, Da'unda'dogg, Sean T,Psynister Cellski Bald Head Ric SB RBL Posse.

On September 4, 2001, Fields was killed in a car accident in Northern California.

== Discography ==
=== Solo albums ===
- Unreleased

=== with I.M.P. ===
- I.M.P. Dogs (1990)
- Back in the Days (1993)
- Ill Mannered Playas (1996)

=== Guest appearances ===
- 1993 – Trying To Survive In The Ghetto (by Herm)
- 1995 - " Animosity " Su-Side Records
- 1995 – Dwellin' in tha Labb (with JT The Bigga Figga)
- 1995 – Iceland (with Cold World Hustlers)
- 1995 – I Hate You With a Passion (with Dre Dog)
- 1996 - Ounce of Game (with Two-Illeven)
- 1997 – West Coast Bad Boyz, Vol. 1: Anotha Level of the Game
- 1997 – Notorious Pimps Playas & Hustlas
- 1997 – Cloud Nine Production's Fattest James Volume 1
- 1997 – Southwest Riders
- 1998 – Bayriderz
- 1998 – 50/50 Chances
- 1998 – 17 Reasons
- 1998 – Million Dollar Dream: This Is How We Lay Low
- 1998 – 4080 Magazine Compilation II: Bay Luv
- 1998 – 4080 Magazine Compilation III: The Twomp Sack
- 1998 – Isolated in the Game (BayWay Records)
- 1998 - "Heaven or Hell" (with Kung Fu Vampire)
- 1999 – Million Dollar Dream: Money & Muscle
- 1999 – The Soundtrack (by Apt.3)
- 2001 – Bay Area Playas 3
- 2002 – Theme Music To Drug Dealins & Killins (by Apt.3/DNA)
- 2005 – Known Associates 2 (by Apt.3/DNA Ent & Apt 4)
- 2005 - Rip Love (by Guce & Road)
