= Funky Aztecs =

American hip hop group

The Funky Aztecs are a hip-hop/rap group from Vallejo, California formed in 1989.

== Career ==
The group was founded by members Merciless, Sapo Loco and Indio. Their debut album Chicano Blues was recorded from August 1990 to October 1991. In 1997 Sapo Loco left the group, leading to the addition of two new members Juego and Mainey Mo. They are most well-known for the track "Slippin' Into Darkness", a collaboration with 2Pac.

== Discography ==
=== Studio albums ===
- Chicano Blues (1992)
- Day of the Dead/Dia De Los Muertos (1995)
- Addicted (1998)

=== Solo projects ===
- Merciless presents – Real Tales of the Funky Aztecs (2000)
- Merciless – Step Into My World (2002)
- Merciless – Flesh & Ink (2004)
