= 24-7-365 (N2Deep album) =

Studio album by N2Deep
- Released: November 15, 1994
- Recorded: 1994
- Genres: West Coast hip-hop, rap
- Length: 68:24
- Label: Bust It
- Producers: Johnny Z, N2Deep, Paisley

N2Deep chronology
Back to the Hotel (1992)	24-7-365 (1994)	The Golden State (1997)

Singles from 24-7-365
- 1. "Deep N2 the Game"; 2. "Small Town"; 3. "California Hot Tubs"; 4. "Somethin' Freaky"

24-7-365 is the second album by rap group, N2Deep. The album was released in 1994 for Bust It Records and was produced by N2Deep and Johnny Z. Despite the success of their previous album, Back to the Hotel, 24-7-365 did not make it on any album charts or feature any charting singles. Four singles were released "Deep N2 the Game", "Small Town", "California Hot Tubs" and "Somethin' Freaky".

== Track listing ==
No.	Title	Length
1.	"Intro"	1:28
2.	"24-7-365" (featuring Joe Loc & Chezski)	5:36
3.	"Small Town" (featuring Mac Lee & PSD)	5:50
4.	"Gatha Round"	4:23
5.	"Count My Bank"	4:54
6.	"High Sidin'"	4:56
7.	"Best Ever"	4:06
8.	"Playa Jay Tee" (Intro by Mac Dre)	5:04
9.	"California Hot Tubs"	4:41
10.	"Crooked Hoes"	4:44
11.	"Whoo' Ride"	4:24
12.	"Hogg Nuts"	4:20
13.	"It's All Great" (featuring Shorty B)	4:58
14.	"Somethin' Freaky"	4:24
15.	"Deep N2 the Game"	4:33

== Samples ==
Deep N2 the Game

- "Miss You" by The Rolling Stones

Whoo Ride

- "Rigor Mortis" by Cameo
