= Back to the Hotel =

Studio album by N2Deep
- Released: June 23, 1992
- Recorded: 1991–1992
- Studios: K-Lou (Richmond, California)
- Genre: West Coast hip-hop
- Length: 55:55
- Label: Profile
- Producers: Jonny Z, N2Deep

N2Deep chronology
Back to the Hotel (1992)	24-7-365 (1994)

Singles from Back to the Hotel
- 1. "Back to the Hotel" Released: 1992; 2. "Toss Up" Released: January 11, 1993; 3. "The Weekend" Released: 1993

Back to the Hotel is the debut album by American rap group N2Deep, released on June 23, 1992, via Profile Records. The album was produced by N2Deep and Jonny Z. The only guests on the album were fellow Vallejo, California, artists B-Legit and E-40. Along with singles, music videos were released for three songs: "Back to the Hotel", "Toss Up" and "The Weekend".

== Reception and chart performance ==
Professional ratings
Review scores
Source	Rating
AllMusic	2/5 stars

The album peaked at number 55 on the Billboard 200, number 29 on the Billboard Top R&B/Hip-Hop Albums chart and number 1 on the Billboard Top Heatseekers Albums chart. The album features the single "Back to the Hotel", which peaked at number 14 on the Billboard Hot 100 and number 12 on the Billboard Rap Songs chart. The single "Toss-Up" peaked at number 92 on the Billboard Hot 100 and at number 74 on the Billboard Rap Songs chart.

== Track listing ==
No.	Title	Length
1.	"Intro"	0:43
2.	"Toss Up"	4:00
3.	"Back to the Hotel"	5:04
4.	"Do tha Crew"	3:53
5.	"The Weekend"	4:05
6.	"Get Mine"	5:03
7.	"V-Town" (featuring B-Legit & E-40)	6:57
8.	"Ya Gotta Go"	0:58
9.	"Comin' Legit"	4:40
10.	"Mack Daddyz"	6:45
11.	"The Revenge of Starchild"	1:31
12.	"Shakedown"	4:47
Total length:		55:09

== Samples ==
Back to the Hotel

- "Darkest Light" by Lafayette Afro Rock Band
- "Early in the Morning" by the Gap Band

Do Tha Crew

- "A Real Mother for Ya'" by Johnny Guitar Watson

Mack Daddyz

- "Get Up, Stand Up" by Bob Marley and the Wailers

Shakedown

- "Blues Dance Raid" by Steel Pulse

== Chart history ==
Chart (1992)	Peak position
U.S. Billboard 200	55
U.S. Billboard Top Heatseekers	1
U.S. Billboard Top R&B/Hip-Hop Albums	29

== Certifications ==
Region	Certification	Certified units/sales
United States (RIAA)	Gold	500,000^{^}
^{^} Shipments figures based on certification alone.
