= 11/5 =

American musical group

- Taydatay, Maine-O & Hennessy

Background information
- Also known as: Eleven Five
- Origin: San Francisco, California
- Genres: Hip hop; gangsta rap; G-funk
- Years active: 1994–2001
- Labels: Dogday
- Past members: Maine-O Hennessy Taydatay
- Website: Taydatay MySpace Page

11/5 was an American hip hop group from the Hunters Point section of San Francisco, California whose members were Maine-O, Hennessy and Taydatay, they were signed to Dogday Records, and were active from 1994 to 2001.

== Biography ==
The Bay Area-based trio first appeared in 1992 on Cold World Hustlers first album Cold Streets on the song "Ni*** Took" then later in 1994 on Primo's album Stickin' to the Script on the song "Killa". Shortly after, they would release their debut album, Fiendin' 4 tha Funk. The album sold little outside the Bay Area and only made it to #76 on the Billboard's Top R&B/Hip-Hop Albums chart. The following year, they released a follow-up entitled A-1 Yola, which would fare much better on the charts, making it to #33 on the Top R&B/Hip-Hop Albums chart and #22 on the Top Heatseekers. After A-1 Yola, two more albums were released, 1999's The Overdose and 2001's After the Drama, as well as two compilations, before disbanding in 2001.

== Discography ==
=== Studio albums ===
- Fiendin' 4 tha Funk (1995)
- A-1 Yola (1996)
- The Overdose (1999)
- After the Drama (2001)

=== Collaboration albums ===
- U Didn't Know?? with Cold World Hustlers, U.D.I. & Big Mack (2002)

=== Compilation albums ===
- Bootlegs & G-Sides (1997)
- Bootlegs & G-Sides, Vol. 2 (2000)
- Grind & Post (2002)

=== Solo projects ===
- Taydatay – Anticipaytion (1998)
- Taydatay Presents – Bay 2 Sac (2001)
- Taydatay & Black C – Prime Factorz (2002)
- Taydatay – Out of Sight, On the Grind (2003)
- Taydatay Presents – Urban Legendz (2003)
- Taydatay Aka T-Gunna – Death of a Legend • New Life for a Boss (2008)
- Taydatay & Big Mack – Access Granted (2013)
