= N2Deep =

American hip-hop group

- TL & Jay Tee

Background information
- Origin: Vallejo, California, U.S.
- Genres: West Coast hip-hop, rap rock, gangsta rap, Chicano rap
- Years active: 1989–present
- Labels: 40 Ounce Records, Swerve Records, Bust It, Profile Records
- Members: James "Jay Tee" Trujillo; Timothy "TL" Lyon
- Past members: Lofty (Joe Battle)
- Website: The Band's MySpace Page

N2Deep is an American Chicano rap duo formed in Vallejo, California in 1989. Consisting of James "Jay Tee" Trujillo and Timothy "TL" Lyon, they are best known for the 1992 hit single "Back to the Hotel", the title track of their debut album. Early third member John "Johnny Z" Zunino officially left the group as a performing member in its first year to focus exclusively on production and related behind-the-scenes responsibilities.

== Biography ==
The group was formed in 1989 in Vallejo, California by Johnny Z (John Zunino), Jay Tee (James Trujillo) and TL (Timothy Lyon). While attending college in Sacramento, Johnny Z began producing hip-hop and after graduating and moving back to Vallejo, TL referred Johnny to an aspiring rapper, Jay Tee. The three began writing and recording hip-hop demos and performing live shows originally as 3DEEP. Before long, Johnny Z decided to work strictly behind the scenes and on the music and production end, while Jay Tee and TL performed the vocals and live shows.

In 1990, the group now known as N2DEEP released an up-tempo single on vinyl record and cassette titled "Work That Body" on Rated Z Recordz, a label and production company started by Johnny Z. The single saw some club play and opened the doors for more live shows throughout the Bay Area. By 1992, the group and Rated Z prepared to release an EP, titled Back At The Hotel. Just before the cassette tape and vinyl record were to be released, N2DEEP, Johnny, and then Rated Z consultant, Steve Bernstein decided to send the tape to Cory Robbins of Profile Records. Cory then contacted Steve and offered a production contract to Rated Z for the group. By May 1992, the first single, now titled "Back to the Hotel", was released on Profile Records and distributed by Landmark Distributors (owned by businessman Jeffrey Collins). "Back to the Hotel" quickly moved up the charts, peaking at No. 14 on the Billboard Hot 100. An eponymous album (N2Deep's debut studio album) was also released, both eventually received RIAA certified gold records for sales of over 500,000.

The group enjoyed success from the single and album and toured the country performing numerous live shows, including KMEL's Summer Jam on more than one occasion.

In 1993, N2DEEP signed with management company Bust It, and began recording their second album. But before anything from the album could get released, Profile Records was sold and the group was dropped from the label. Bust It quickly released the second album, 24-7-365, but despite some initial radio success expectations quickly became pessimistic, and 24-7-365 ultimately failed to approach the sales of Back to the Hotel.

After a roughly three-year hiatus, the group went on to release The Golden State in 1997 on independent label Swerve Records. In 1998, N2Deep released The Rumble; it was predominantly a Jay Tee solo effort, with TL appearing on only a single song. In 2000, Slightly Pimpish/Mostly Doggish followed suit as another Jay Tee solo work was released under the N2Deep moniker, with TL this time entirely absent.

In 2001, Jay Tee dropped the N2Deep moniker and began releasing solo albums under his own name; the duo, however never officially broke up. In 2007, N2Deep released a DVD with music videos, interviews and behind the scenes footage, entitled N2Deep: More Than Money.

In 2008, Jay Tee and TL de facto reformed N2Deep and started performing with longtime friend and rapper Joe "Lofty" Battle, guitarist and producer Mike "Big Mike" Mekhalian, drummer Andrew Fox, and bassist Gregory Holben (later replaced by Ray B. Williams). The reformed group successfully started performing shows across the Bay Area to promote their upcoming new album The Movement. The album was released on November 18, 2008, on Jay Tee's own label, 40 Ounce Records.

For nearly two decades, N2Deep have remained an underground presence in Northern California and the Bay Area rap scene, releasing several group and solo albums on their respective independent labels.

On January 22, 2011, while visiting with friends and family, Joe "Lofty" Battle and his wife, Tamera, were killed in a motorcycle accident in Vacaville, California.

== Discography ==
=== Studio albums ===
- Back to the Hotel (1992)
- 24-7-365 (1994)
- The Golden State (1997)
- The Rumble (1998)
- Slightly Pimpish/Mostly Doggish (2000)
- The Movement (2008)

=== Compilation albums ===
- The Best of N2Deep (1999)
- The Knocks 1992–2000 with Latino Velvet (2001)
- Unreleased Game 1993: The Lost Album (2002)

=== DVDs ===
- More Than Money (2007)

== See also ==
- Jay Tee's solo discography
