= Baby Bash discography =

This is the discography of American rapper Baby Bash.

== Albums ==
=== Studio albums ===
Title	Details	Peak chart positions			Certifications
Title	Details	US	US R&B	US Rap	Certifications
Savage Dreams	Released: June 19, 2001; Label: Dope House; Format: CD, digital download	—	—	*	
On Tha Cool	Released: June 11, 2002; Label: Dope House; Format: CD, digital download	—	—	*	
Tha Smokin' Nephew	Released: September 23, 2003; Label: Universal; Format: CD, digital download	48	32	*	RIAA: Platinum
Super Saucy	Released: March 15, 2005; Label: Universal; Format: CD, digital download	11	7	3	
Cyclone	Released: October 30, 2007; Label: Arista; Format: CD, digital download	30	11	5	
Bashtown	Released: March 22, 2011; Label: Bashtown, Diamond Lane, Dope House; Format: CD, digital download	—	38	19	
Unsung	Released: December 17, 2013; Label: Bashtown, Diamond Lane, Dope House; Format: CD, digital download	—	—	—	
Ronnie Rey All Day	Released: November 18, 2014; Label: Bashtown, Diamond Lane, Dope House; Format: CD, digital download	—	—	—	
Don't Panic, It's Organic	Released: November 11, 2016; Label: Bashtown, Diamond Lane, Dope House; Format: CD, digital download	—	—	—	
"*" indicates that chart did not exist; "—" indicates that release did not chart.

=== Collaboration albums ===
- Welcome to Da Tilt with Potna Deuce (1994)
- Latino Velvet Project with Latino Velvet (1997)
- Velvet City with Latino Velvet (2000)
- Wanted with Lone Star Ridaz (2001)
- Velvetism with Jay Tee (2002)
- M.S.U. with Jay Tee (2012)
- Playamade Mexicanz with Lucky Luciano (2012)
- The Legalizers: Legalize or Die, Vol. 1 with Paul Wall (2016)
- Sangria with Frankie J (2017)
- The Legalizers, Vol. 2: Indoor Grow with Paul Wall (2018)

=== Compilation albums ===
- What's Really! Game One (2000)
- Get Wiggy! (2002)
- The Ultimate Cartel with Flatline Records (2003)
- Ménage à Trois (2004)
- So Quick...Like a Heist with A-Wax (2004)

=== Mixtapes ===
- The Camp Is Back with Latino Velvet (2007)

== Singles ==
=== As lead artist ===
Title	Year	Chart positions									Certifications	Album
Title	Year	US	US R&B	US Rap	CAN	AUS	GER	NZ	SWE	SWI	Certifications	Album
"Sexy Eyes (Da Da Da Da)" (featuring Russell Lee)	2003	—	—	—	—	—	—	—	—	—		Tha Smokin' Nephew
"Shorty DooWop" (featuring Russell Lee & Perla Cruz)	2003	115	108	—	—	—	—	—	—	—		Tha Smokin' Nephew
"Suga Suga" (featuring Frankie J)	2003	7	54	10	—	3	4	1	28	2	RIAA: 4× Platinum; BPI: Silver; RMNZ: 4× Platinum	Tha Smokin' Nephew
"Baby, I'm Back" (featuring Akon)	2005	19	52	9	—	—	—	—	—	—	RIAA: Gold; RMNZ: Platinum	Super Saucy
"Who Wit Me?"	2005	—	—	—	—	—	—	—	—	—		Super Saucy
"Cyclone" (featuring T-Pain)	2007	7	70	6	41	—	—	—	—	—	RIAA: 2× Platinum; RMNZ: Gold	Cyclone
"What Is It" (featuring Sean Kingston)	2008	57	—	12	—	—	—	—	—	—		Cyclone
"Don't Stop" (featuring Keith Sweat)	2008	—	—	22	—	—	—	—	—	—		Cyclone
"That's How I Go" (featuring Mario and Lil Jon)	2009	107	—	17	—	—	—	—	—	—		Non-album singles
"Outta Control" (featuring Pitbull)	2009	112	—	14	—	—	—	—	—	—		Non-album singles
"Go Girl" (featuring E-40)	2010	111	—	23	—	—	—	—	—	—		Bashtown
"Swanananana" (featuring Slim Thug and Stooie Bros.)	2011	—	—	—	—	—	—	—	—	—		Bashtown
"Head Hunta" (featuring Z-Ro and Lucky Luciano)	2011	—	—	—	—	—	—	—	—	—		Bashtown
"Vegas Nights" (featuring Jump Smokers)	2011	—	—	—	—	—	—	—	—	—		Non-album singles
"Slide Over" (featuring Miguel)	2011	—	77	—	—	—	—	—	—	—		Non-album singles
"Certified Freak" (featuring Baeza and G. Curtis)	2014	—	—	—	—	—	—	—	—	—		Ronnie Rey All Day
"—" denotes a recording that did not chart or was not released in that territory.

=== As featured artist ===
Title	Year	Chart positions							Certifications	Album
Title	Year	US	US R&B	AUS	CAN CHR	NZ	UK	UK R&B	Certifications	Album
"Wiggy Wiggy" (featuring Baby Beesh)	1999	—	—	—	—	—	—	—		The 3rd Wish
"Valley" (featuring Ace Deuce & Grimm & Ikeman & L.T. & Mike Littles & Monster & Pancho Villa & Pimpstress & Rasheed & Shoe Lace & Skrilla & Star Baby)	1999	—	—	—	—	—	—	—		The 3rd Wish
"Follow My Lead" (featuring Baby Beesh & Christian)	2000	—	—	—	—	—	—	—		The Purity Album
"2 Joints" (featuring Baby Beesh)	2000	—	—	—	—	—	—	—		The Purity Album
"I Wanna Know Her Name" (featuring Baby Beesh & Low G & Russell Lee)	2000	—	—	—	—	—	—	—		The Purity Album
"Oh My My" (featuring Baby Beesh)	2000	—	—	—	—	—	—	—		Time Is Money
"Twice Last Night" (featuring Baby Beesh)	2000	—	—	—	—	—	—	—		Time Is Money
"Ooh Wee" (featuring Baby Beesh)	2000	—	—	—	—	—	—	—		Time Is Money
"My Feria" (featuring Kumbia Kings & Baby Beesh & Low G)	2000	—	—	—	—	—	—	—		Time Is Money
"Something I Would Do" (featuring Baby Beesh)	2000	—	—	—	—	—	—	—		Time Is Money
"Don't Let 'Em Fool Ya" (featuring Baby Beesh & Rasheed & Low G)	2000	—	—	—	—	—	—	—		Time Is Money
"Hubba Hubba" (featuring Baby Beesh)	2001	—	—	—	—	—	—	—		Never Change
"I Need a Sweet" (featuring Angelina Perez & Baby Beesh)	2002	—	—	—	—	—	—	—		Reveille Park
"Obsession (No Es Amor)" (Frankie J featuring Baby Bash)	2005	3	69	5	—	4	38	24	RMNZ: Gold	The One
"Energy" (Natalie featuring Baby Bash)	2006	66	—	—	—	—	—	—		Natalie
"Something About Mary" (featuring Baby Bash & Russell Lee)	2006	—	—	—	—	—	—	—		When Devils Strike
"Dope House Family" (featuring Baby Bash & Carolyn & Coast & Grimm & Low G & Lucky Luciano & Powda & Quota Key & Rasheed)	2006	—	—	—	—	—	—	—		When Devils Strike
"Doing Too Much" (Paula DeAnda featuring Baby Bash)	2006	41	—	—	50	—	—	—		Paula DeAnda
"Gallery (Remix)" (Mario Vazquez featuring Baby Bash)	2007	35	—	42	—	—	—	—		Non-album single
"You've Got a Friend" (Far East Movement featuring Baby Bash and Lil Rob)	2008	—	—	—	—	—	—	—		Animal
"Hoggin' & Doggin'" (featuring Baby Bash, Carolyn, Lucky Luciano and Low G)	2008	—	—	—	—	—	—	—		The Last Chair Violinist
"In Hillwood" (featuring Baby Bash, Ice and Carolyn)	2008	—	—	—	—	—	—	—		The Last Chair Violinist
"Teardrops" (Kate Alexa featuring Baby Bash)	2008	—	—	26	—	—	—	—		Non-album single
"This Boy's Fire" (Santana featuring Jennifer Lopez and Baby Bash)	2008	—	—	—	—	—	—	—		Ultimate Santana
"Aja Ni Aja" (Bohemia featuring Baby Bash)	2012	—	—	—	—	—	—	—		Thousand Thoughts
"Rodeo" (Berner featuring Baby Bash and Ty Dolla $ign)	2013	—	—	—	—	—	—	—		Drugstore Cowboy
"Photobomb" (Jump Smokers featuring Baby Bash)	2014	—	—	—	—	—	—	—		Non-album singles
"Ay Yi Yi" (J. Romero featuring Baby Bash)	2015	—	—	—	—	—	—	—		Non-album singles
"I Want That Old Thing Back" (King Lil G featuring Malik and Baby Bash)	2016	—	—	—	—	—	—	—		Lost in Smoke 2
"Midnight Flights" (Berner and B-Real featuring Baby Bash and Trick Trick)	2020	—	—	—	—	—	—	—		Los Meros
"—" denotes a recording that did not chart or was not released in that territory.

== Other charted songs ==
Title	Year	Peak chart positions	Album
Title	Year	US Rap	Album
"Fantasy Girl" (featuring Marty James)	2010	23	Bashtown
