= Neon Hitch discography =

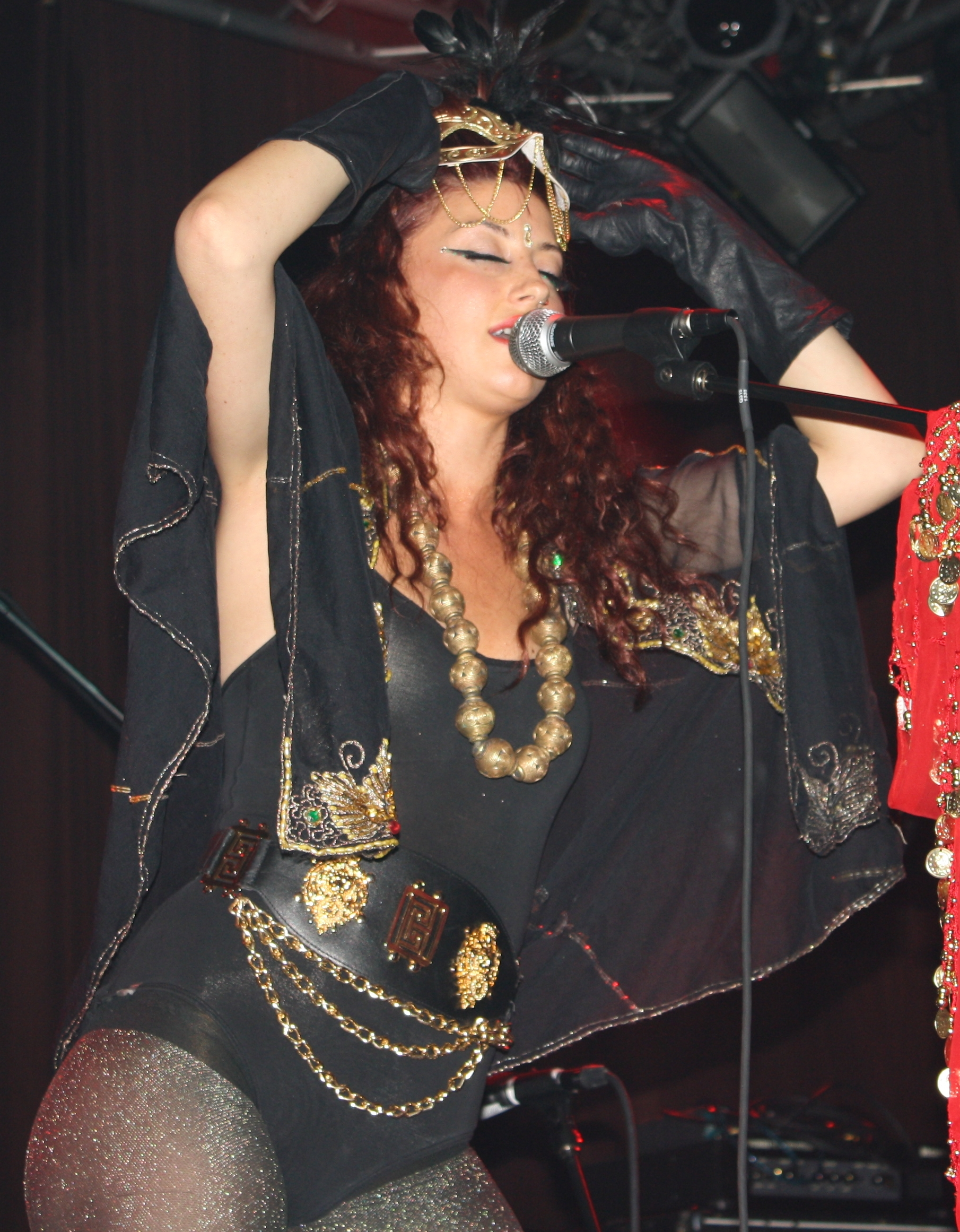
- Hitch performing in New York City in 2010
- Studio albums: 2
- EPs: 6
- Singles: 10
- Music videos: 16
- Promotional singles: 12

The discography of English singer and songwriter Neon Hitch. Neon's debut digital single "Get Over U" was released in February 2011. Hitch then released her single "Bad Dog", which was intended to be the lead single from her debut album. Later in 2011, she was featured on Gym Class Heroes' song "Ass Back Home". In 2012, Neon Hitch released "Fuck U Betta" and "Gold" featuring Tyga, her official first and second singles respectively. Both songs peaked at number one on the Billboard Hot Dance Club Play chart.

Neon then debuted an EP entitled Happy Neon in January 2013, which was released online for free. In October 2013, Neon announced that her debut album Beg, Borrow & Steal had been scrapped and she would release a new album that had more of her "soul" in it. In January 2014, Neon released the mixtape 301 to Paradise for free. In May 2014, it was announced that Hitch had parted ways with her label Warner Bros. and was gearing up to releasing her new debut album Eleutheromaniac; she also released Happy Neon and 301 to Paradise to digital retailers independently in the same month.

She premiered the lead single of Eleutheromaniac, "Yard Sale", in August 2014. In January 2015, Neon released "Sparks" as the first single from the album. In March 2015, Hitch released the EP 24:00 for free. In 2016, it was announced that Hitch had changed the name of her debut album to Anarchy, which was released on 22 July 2016. The lead single from the album, "Please", was released on 8 July 2016. The album did not contain any of the singles intended to be on Eluetheromaniac, but included a promomotional single she released in 2015, "Freedom".

After the release of her debut album, Hitch then released a single called "Serious" in tribute to the victims of the Pulse nightclub shooting in June 2016.

In August 2017, Neon returned with the single "I Know You Wannit" as a teaser for her second studio album.

In July 2018, Hitch released two singles, "Problem" and "Wall Street", in support of her second album Reincarnation, released under her own label WeRNeon in January 2018.

== Albums ==
Title	Details
Anarchy	Release date: 22 July 2016; Label: WeRNeon; Format: Digital download, LP
Reincarnation	Release date: 30 January 2019; Label: WeRNeon; Format: Digital download

== EPs and mixtapes ==
Title	Details
Happy Neon	Released: 14 January 2013; Label: Warner Bros.; Format: Digital download
301 to Paradise	Released: 3 January 2014; Label: Warner Bros.; Format: Digital download
24:00	Released: 1 March 2015; Label: WeRNeon; Format: Digital download
Free Style	Released: 22 April 2021; Label: WeRNeon; Format: Digital download
Light Touch	Released: 16 September 2022; Label: WeRNeon; Format: Digital download
Rebirth	Released: 24 November 2022; Label: WeRNeon; Format: Digital download

== Singles ==
=== As lead artist ===
Title	Year	Album
"Fuck U Betta"	2012	Non-album singles
"Gold"	2012	Non-album singles
"Yard Sale"	2014	Non-album singles
"Sparks"	2015	Non-album singles
"Freedom"	2015	Anarchy
"Please"	2016	Anarchy
"Neighborhood"	2016	Anarchy
"Serious"	2016	Non-album single
"I Know You Wannit"	2017	Reincarnation
"Problem"	2018	Reincarnation

=== As featured artist ===
Title	Year	Peak chart positions									Certifications	Album
Title	Year	UK	AUS	CAN	IRL	NLD	NOR	NZ	US	US Pop	Certifications	Album
"Follow Me Down" (3OH!3 featuring Neon Hitch)	2010	—	—	36	—	—	—	—	89	—		Almost Alice
"Ass Back Home" (Gym Class Heroes featuring Neon Hitch)	2011	9	1	24	10	81	15	11	12	5	BPI: Silver; ARIA: 3× Platinum; MC: Gold; RIAA: Platinum; RMNZ: 2× Platinum	The Papercut Chronicles II
"Devil" (Cash Cash featuring Busta Rhymes, B.o.B and Neon Hitch)	2015	115	—	—	95	—	—	—	—	58		Blood, Sweat & 3 Years
"Lovin" (Breathe Carolina & APEK featuring Neon Hitch)	2016	—	—	—	—	—	—	—	—	—		Non-album single
''Wrong Places'' (Borgeous featuring Neon Hitch)	2016	—	—	—	—	—	33	—	—	—		13
"Lost & Found" (Borgeous & 7 Skies featuring Neon Hitch)	2016	—	—	—	—	—	64	—	—	—		13
'When Will I See You Again? (Nytrix featuring Neon Hitch)	2016	—	—	—	—	—	—	—	—	56		Non-album single
''No Warning'' (Jason Parris & My Buddy Mike featuring Neon Hitch)	2016	—	—	—	—	—	—	—	—	—		Non-album single
'Poppy Seeds'' (Party Thieves & JayKode featuring Neon Hitch)	2017	—	—	—	—	—	—	—	—	—		Non-album single
''We Don't Talk About It'' (Fabian Mazur featuring Neon Hitch)	2017	—	—	—	—	—	—	—	—	—		Non-album single
''Walking On'' (Sam Trocki featuring Neon Hitch)	2018	—	—	—	—	—	—	—	—	—		TBA

=== Promotional singles ===
Title	Year	Album
"Get Over U"	2011	Non-album singles
"Silly Girl"	2011	Non-album singles
"Bad Dog"	2011	Non-album singles
"Poisoned with Love"	2011	Non-album singles
"Some Like It Hot" (featuring Kinetics)	2014	301 to Paradise
"Warner Blvd"	2014	Non-album single
"Freedom"	2015	Anarchy
"Eleutheromaniac"	2015	Non-album single
"Pussy Power"	2015	Non-album single

== Songwriting ==
Song	Year	Artist	Album
"Stupid Love Letter" (background vocals by Neon Hitch)	2009	Friday Night Boys	Off the Deep End
"Blah Blah Blah" (featuring 3OH!3)	2010	Kesha	Animal
"Traces"	2010	Sky Ferreira	As If!
"Made In America"	2014	Cimorelli	Made in America
"I Don't Wanna Let You Go"	2014	Stefanie Scott	Non-album single

== Music videos ==
=== As lead artist ===
Title	Year	Director(s)
"Derek" (Streets Remix)	2006	Mike Skinner
"Get Over U"	2011	Jason Bergh
"U + Me"	2011	Unknown
"Fuck U Betta"	2012	Chris Applebaum
"Gold" (Lyric Video)	2012	PotsNPans
"Pink Fields"	2013	PotsNPans
"Midnight Sun"	2013	PotsNPans
"Gypsy Star"	2014	Neon Hitch
"Some Like It Hot" (featuring Kinetics)	2014	Neon Hitch
"Yard Sale"	2014	Charlie Zwick
"Freedom"	2015	Matt Cullom
"Sparks"	2015	Ryan Gregory Phillips
''Neighborhood''	2016	Ben Simkins
''Serious''	2016	Ben Simkins
''I Know You Wannit''	2017	Bobby Hanaford

=== As featured artist ===
Title	Year	Director(s)
"What's Urban" (Wan-Cee featuring Neon Hitch)	2009	Jason Nwansi
"Ass Back Home" (Gym Class Heroes featuring Neon Hitch)	2011	Dugan O'Neal
"Time Machine" (Kinetics & One Love featuring Neon Hitch)	2014	Alan Smith
"Lost & Found" (Borgeous & 7 Skies featuring Neon Hitch)	2016	Joseph Zentil
''When Will I See You Again'' (Nytrix featuring Neon Hitch)	2016	Nytrix

=== Other appearances ===
Title	Year	Director(s)
"Take It Off" (Ke$ha - "Take It Off" (K$´n Friends Version)	2010	SKINNY
