= Ménage à Trois (album) =

Compilation album by Baby Bash
- Released: June 29, 2004
- Recorded: 2002–2004
- Genre: Hip hop
- Label: Empire Music Werks
- Producer: Arthur Coy Jr. Paul Klein

Baby Bash chronology
Tha Smokin' Nephew (2003)	Ménage à Trois (2004)	Super Saucy (2005)

Professional ratings
Review scores
Source	Rating
Allmusic	2.5/5 stars
RapReviews.com	7/10

Ménage à Trois is an independent label compilation album released by Baby Bash, his fifth overall release. The album is made up of tracks from 2003's The Ultimate Cartel, 2002's On Tha Cool & 2001's Savage Dreams when Baby Bash was known as Baby Beesh.

== Track listing ==
1. Ménage à Trois (featuring Shadow, Don Cisco & Frankie J)
2. Hot Zone (featuring Frost, Nino Brown & Frankie J)
3. Esquina (featuring Frost, Mr. Gee, Lawless & Don Cisco)
4. My Side of Town (Screwed & Chopped) (featuring Uchie, Lucky Luciano, Latin Embassy, I-35, Eternal & Esc Loc)
5. Cuidado (featuring Rasheed, Juan Gotti & Raw B)
6. Choppers & Copters (featuring Lil One & Coast)
7. Dime Piece (featuring Russell Lee)
8. Doe Doe Raps (featuring True Breed & Killa Nine)
9. Short Skirts (featuring South Park Mexican)
10. On da Go (featuring Ayana)
11. Crazy Love (featuring Don Cisco & Frost)
12. Come On Now (featuring Don Cisco & Rasheed)
13. Head Hunta (featuring Powda, Tony Montana)
14. N.R.G. (featuring South Park Mexican & Rasheed)
15. Who Wanna Creep? (featuring Latino Velvet)
16. Na Na Tonight (featuring Ayana)
17. Na Na Get Wet (featuring South Park Mexican, Grimm & Rasheed)
18. QuarterBack (featuring Mr. Kee)
19. Space City (featuring Tow Down & Lucky Luciano)
20. On Tha Cool (featuring DJ Kane & Drew)
