= They Can't Deport Us All =

- Front cover of the album

Studio album by Chingo Bling
- Released: August 14, 2007
- Recorded: 2006–2007
- Genre: Comedy hip-hop
- Length: 1:17:49
- Labels: Big Chile; Asylum
- Producers: Carnival Beats; Dani Kartel; Happy Perez; Jim Jonsin; Russell Lee; Shadow; Smoke Beats

Chingo Bling chronology
The Tamale Kingpin (2004)	They Can't Deport Us All (2007)	Superthrowd (2008)

They Can't Deport Us All is the fifth studio album by Mexican-American rapper Chingo Bling. It was released on August 14, 2007 via Big Chile Enterprises and Asylum Records. Produced mostly by Carnival Beats and Jim Jonsin, it features guest appearances from Fat Pat, Baby Bash, Coast, Fabo, Ice, Latasha, Lucky Luciano, Mistah F.A.B., Paul Wall, Russell Lee and Stunta among others.

In the United States, the album debuted at number 123 on the Billboard 200, number 28 on the Top R&B/Hip-Hop Albums and number 11 on the Top Rap Albums charts, selling over 6,000 copies in its first week. The album was promoted with singles "Do The Lasso" and "Like This and Like That". Its Eddie DeVille's chopped and screwed version was released the same year.

== Controversy ==
Chingo Bling had been criticized for the title of his second album They Can't Deport Us All. He was interviewed on CW39 News and said his family's tamale truck has been shot at, vandalized and even, on one occasion, stolen. He also stated he had received racist death threats from White nationalist groups, but still does not intend to change his album's title. Music critics often associated his music with violent street gangs. Chingo also alleges that he was refused the opportunity to appear at a scheduled in-store album signing at a Dallas shopping mall as a direct result of the controversy surrounding his clothing and album name. He also asserts that he is the target of numerous Conservative journalists and right wing bloggers who criticize him because of his music and marketing concepts related to immigration.

== Track listing ==
No.	Title	Producer(s)	Length
1.	"They Can't Deport Us All"	Carnival Beats	2:35
2.	"Southside Thang" (featuring Paul Wall and Fat Pat)	Carnival Beats	4:16
3.	"Still Goin' Down!" (featuring Fat Pat)	Carnival Beats	2:59
4.	"Chinglish 4 Dummies (Skit)"		0:54
5.	"Ball Everywhere I Go" (featuring Lucky Luciano)	Jim Jonsin	4:01
6.	"Werk That (Funky Mañosa)"	Jim Jonsin	3:39
7.	"In Case They Forgot" (featuring Latasha)	Carnival Beats	3:17
8.	"Like This N Like That"	Carnival Beats	3:58
9.	"I'ma Do This"	Jim Jonsin	4:03
10.	"Bob O'Riley (Border Skit)"		2:13
11.	"Show That Chit" (featuring Russell Lee)	Russell Lee	4:38
12.	"Head Honcho" (featuring Baby Bash)	Happy Perez	3:23
13.	"Lil' Marvin - So Fantabulous"		2:55
14.	"Poppin' Bottles" (featuring Stunta, Sho Stoppa and Max Minelli)	Dani Kartel	5:09
15.	"Who Dat" (featuring Pitbull and 5th Ward Weebie)	Jim Jonsin	4:06
16.	"Reppin' Da Soufside" (featuring Flatline)	Carnival Beats	3:20
17.	"Ese Lil' Cholo Strikes Again"	Carnival Beats	1:38
18.	"5th Wheel" (featuring Big Pokey)		3:52
19.	"Do the Lasso" (featuring Mistah F.A.B. and Fabo)	Shadow	4:07
20.	"Jimmy Dean Boberry (Drive Thru Skit)"		3:12
21.	"Tira Te Patrazz" (featuring Ice)	Smoke Beats	4:46
22.	"Hangin' On (My Song)" (featuring Coast and Stunta)	Carnival Beats	4:48
Total length:			1:17:49

== Charts ==
Chart (2007)	Peak position
US Billboard 200	123
US Top R&B/Hip-Hop Albums (Billboard)	28
US Top Rap Albums (Billboard)	11
