= Super Saucy =

Studio album by Baby Bash
- Released: March 15, 2005
- Recorded: 2004–05
- Studios: Digital Services (Houston, TX); Konvict Music Studios (Atlanta, GA); Sony Studios (New York, NY); Larabee North (Los Angeles, CA); The Muzik Factory (Las Vegas, NV); The Grill Studios (Oakland, CA)
- Genre: Hip-hop
- Length: 1:03:29
- Labels: Latium; Universal
- Producers: Baby Bash (exec.); Charles Chavez (exec.); Akon; Baby Dooks; Dash; Fredwreck; Happy Perez; Jose "Block Of Rock" De Leon; Swamp Cat; Mintman

Baby Bash chronology
Tha Smokin' Nephew (2003)	Super Saucy (2005)	Cyclone (2007)

Singles from Super Saucy
- 1. "Baby, I'm Back" Released: January 18, 2005; 2. "Who Wit Me?" Released: 2005

Super Saucy is the fourth solo studio album by American hip-hop recording artist Baby Bash. It was released on March 15, 2005, through Latium Entertainment and Universal Records. Recording sessions took place at Digital Services in Houston, Konvict Music Studios in Atlanta, Sony Studios in New York, Larabee North in Los Angeles, The Muzik Factory in Las Vegas, and The Grill Studios in Oakland. Production was handled by Happy Perez, Akon, Baby Dookes, Dash, Fredwreck, Jose "Block Of Rock" De Leon, Swampkat and Mintman, with Charles Chavez and Baby Bash serving as executive producers. It features guest appearances from Akon, Natalie Alvarado, Russell Lee, Angel Dust, Avant, A-Wax, Bosko, Butch Cassidy, Chingo Bling, Don Cisco, E-40, Grimm, Jay Tee, Lucky Luciano, Mac Dre, Miami The Most, Money Mike, Mr. Kee, Nate Dogg, Nino Brown, Paul Wall, Pitbull, Rasheed, Richie Rich, Suga Free and 3rd Wish.

== Singles ==
"Baby, I'm Back" was released on February 21, 2005, as the lead single from the album. The song features guest vocals from Senegalese R&B singer Akon. The song was a commercial success, peaking at number nineteen on the Billboard Hot 100 and number nine on the Hot Rap Songs chart. The song was certified gold by the Recording Industry Association of America (RIAA), for selling 500,000 copies.

The second single, “Who Wit Me”, was released in 2005 to commercial failure as it was unable to appear on any chart.

== Critical reception ==
Professional ratings
Review scores
Source	Rating
AllMusic	3.5/5 stars
Entertainment Weekly	B−
Now	1/5 Ns
RapReviews	8/10
Vibe	2.5/5 marks

Steve 'Flash' Juon of RapReviews praised the production contributions from Happy Perez, Akon, Block of Rock and Fredwreck, and Bash's simplistic delivery of wordplay that shows "not only attention to detail but paint cinematic pictures as he casually flows along", saying that "he's not only made it his own but he's made it to the upper echelons of the pop charts without having to trade in his style - radio and video just latched onto it when they were finally hip to it. Hopefully they're hip to Super Saucy too - it's his best album since 2003 and has all the potential to keep dropping more and more hits year-round". AllMusic's David Jeffries called the record "a party alternative to Nephew", praising Perez's "busy, hooked-filled, Texas magic on numerous tracks" and Bash himself for "adding some much needed freshness to the tired crooner/rapper combo", concluding that "with so much well-done good-time music, the crowd-pleasing Super Saucy is worth considering and generally 'bubbalicious'."

== Commercial performance ==
Super Saucy debuted on the US Billboard 200 chart at number 11, with first week sales of 48,000 copies, becoming Baby Bash's highest charting album to date.

== Track listing ==
No.	Title	Writer(s)	Producer(s)	Length
1.	"Baby I'm Back" (featuring Akon)	Ronald Ray Bryant; Aliaune Thiam	Akon	3:39
2.	"Super Saucy" (featuring Avant)	Bryant; Myron Lavell Avant; Sebastian Ponti Jessop; Angel LaFaele Noe	Swamp Kat	3:59
3.	"That's My Lady (Money)" (featuring Nate Dogg)	Bryant; Nathaniel Hale; Nathan Perez; P. Broussard	Happy Perez	3:50
4.	"Throwed Off" (featuring Paul Wall and Natalie)	Bryant; Paul Slayton; Perez	Happy Perez	3:40
5.	"Trees" (featuring Pitbull and Angel Dust)	Bryant; Armando Pérez; Noe; David Vurdelja; Dražen Kvočić	Baby Dooks; Dash	3:45
6.	"Who Wit' Me?"	Bryant; Perez	Happy Perez	3:25
7.	"No Way Jose" (featuring Akon)	Bryant; Thiam; Mike Leander; Eddie Seago	Akon	5:33
8.	"Keep It 100" (featuring E-40 and Bosko)	Bryant; Earl Stevens; Bosko Kante; Perez	Happy Perez	4:21
9.	"Step in da Club" (featuring Rasheed, Lucky Luciano and Grimm)	Bryant; Alfonso Cook; Christian Garcia; Paul Ramirez; Jose Deleon	Jose "Block Of Rock" De Leon	4:06
10.	"That's What Tha Pimpin's There For" (featuring Suga Free, Money Mike and Chingo Bling)	Bryant; Farid Nassar	Fredwreck	4:44
11.	"Bubbalicious" (featuring Natalie)	Bryant; Perez	Happy Perez	4:18
12.	"Better Than I Can Tell Ya" (featuring A-Wax, Richie Rich and Russell Lee)	Bryant; Aaron Doppie; Russell Atkins; Perez	Happy Perez	4:22
13.	"Hennessey" (featuring Mac Dre, Jay Tee and Miami The Most)	Bryant; Andre Hicks; James Trujillo; Perez	Happy Perez	4:44
14.	"Outro" (featuring Butch Cassidy, Don Cisco, Nino Brown, Russell Lee and Mr. Kee)	Bryant; Butch Cassidy; G. Flores; Atkins; Perez	Happy Perez	5:34
15.	"Obsession" (featuring 3rd Wish)	Anthony Santos; Justin Martin; Enrique Gonzales; Alex Acosta; T. Harrison	Mintman	3:29
Total length:				1:03:29

Sample credits

- Track 7 features samples from "I Ain't Got Time Anymore" written by Eddie Seago and Mike Leander and performed by The Glass Bottle

== Charts ==
Weekly chart performance for Super Saucy
Chart (2005)	Peak position
US Billboard 200	11
US Top R&B/Hip-Hop Albums (Billboard)	7
US Top Rap Albums (Billboard)	3
