= Bashtown =

Studio album by Baby Bash
- Released: March 17, 2011
- Recorded: 2010
- Studios: Cold Chamber Studios, Houston, Texas; The Beachwood Bangers, Houston, Texas
- Genres: Hip-hop; Latin hip-hop; R&B
- Length: 62:32
- Label: Upstairs
- Producers: Jim Jonsin; Printz Board; Happy Perez; J. Lacy; Mickaël; C. Ballin; DJ Rex; Steve Dang; Ocies Groceries; Moox

Baby Bash chronology
Cyclone (2007)	Bashtown (2011)	Unsung (2013)

Singles from Bashtown
- 1. "Go Girl" Released: November 30, 2010; 2. "Swanananana" Released: March 8, 2011; 3. "Head Hunta" Released: March 22, 2011

Bashtown is the fourth studio album, and eighth album overall, released by the American rapper Baby Bash. Released on March 22, 2011, it is the first of his albums to be released on Upstairs Records. Bashtown was produced by Jim Jonsin, Printz Board, Happy Perez, Mickaël, J. Lacy, and C-Ballin, while also featuring guest appearances by E-40, Paul Wall, Slim Thug, Jay Rock, Marty James, The Jacka, Z-Ro, Krizz Kaliko, Lucky Luciano, and Lloyd, among others. According to Baby Bash, the album was recorded entirely in 2010, although many singles and the album were released in 2011.

== Singles ==
The album has six singles in total, three of them being promotional and three official. The first promotional Single was "Buttakup" released on March 30, 2010. The song was produced by and featured J. Lacy and contained more of an R&B style. "Fantasy Girl", released on July 13, 2010, was a retro-dance influenced track featuring vocals by the One Block Radius singer Marty James who has worked with many artists such as Snoop Dogg, E-40 and Tech N9ne. The third promotional single "Good for My Money", features Lloyd, and was released on October 5, 2010.

The first official single, "Go Girl", which features E-40, is a pop rap track and was released on November 30, 2010. Currently, "Go Girl" has been the most successful song on the album. The second single, "Swanananana", released on March 8, 2011, features Slim Thug and Da Stooie Bros. The third official single is "Head Hunta", featuring the rap artists Z-Ro and Lucky Luciano, and was released on March 22, 2011.

== Reception ==
=== Reviews ===
Professional ratings
Review scores
Source	Rating
AllMusic	link
Yo! Raps	link

The album received generally mixed reviews. Critics Jeremy Carmona from Yo! Raps said that the album is "club influenced" similar to his previous album, Cyclone. David Jeffries from Allmusic described it as "his best effort since his major-label debut, Tha Smokin' Nephew".

=== Commercial performance ===
Bashtown charted on Billboard peaking at #38 on the R&B/Hip-Hop Albums chart. In the second week, Bashtown fell to #61 on the same chart. Bashtown also charted on Billboard Independent albums at #31 and Top Rap Albums at #19. To date the album has sold 6,000 copies in the US.

== Track listing ==
Confirmed by iTunes, Amazon, and writers by AllMusic, and producers from CD Inlay.

No.	Title	Writer(s)	Producer(s)	Length
1.	"Intro"	Ronnie Ray Bryant	Happy Perez	1:30
2.	"Swanananana" (featuring Slim Thug & Da Stooie Bros.)	Bryant; Stayve Jerome Thomas	Mickaël	3:56
3.	"Go Girl" (featuring E-40)	Bryant; Curtis James Jackson III; Earl Stevens; Chris Jackson	C-Ballin	3:46
4.	"Hit Me (BBM Me) If You Miss Me" (featuring Carlito Olivero & Printz Board)	Bryant; Mario James; Marty James; Priese Prince LaMont Board	Printz Board	3:48
5.	"Kick Rocks" (featuring Mickaël)	Bryant	Steve Dang	3:28
6.	"Body Moves Slow" (featuring Paul Wall & Krizz Kaliko)	Bryant; Jackson; Paul Michael Slayton; Samuel William Christopher Watson	C-Ballin	4:20
7.	"Don't Mess With Texas" (featuring South Park Mexican, Lucky Luciano & Shyykidd)	Bryant; Carlos Coy; Christian Anthony Garcia	Happy Perez	4:25
8.	"Woyyoy" (featuring The Jacka, Jay Rock & Mickaël)	Bryant; David Newton; Johnnie McKenzie; Manuel Rosenthal; Shaheed Akbar	Steve Dang	3:28
9.	"Beast In The Bedroom" (featuring Major James)	Bryant; Jackson; James	C-Ballin	3:55
10.	"Good For My Money" (featuring Lloyd)	Bryant; James Scheffer; Lloyd Polite, Jr.	Jim Jonsin	3:51
11.	"Roller Coaster Ride" (featuring O.C. & King Solo)	Bryant; Omar Credle Townsend	Ocies Groceries	3:54
12.	"Head Hunta" (featuring Z-Ro & Lucky Luciano)	Bryant; Garcia; Joseph Wayne McVey	DJ Rex	3:32
13.	"Hope I Don't Violate" (featuring Latino Velvet)	Bryant; James Trujillo; Francisco Soto	Steve Dang	4:53
14.	"Buttakup" (featuring J. Lacy)	Bryant; Lacy	J. Lacy	3:29
15.	"Fantasy Girl" (featuring Marty James)	Bryant; James; Jackson	C-Ballin	3:28
16.	"Buttakup" (Remix) (featuring Chalie Boy & J. Lacy)	Bryant; Charles Istan Williams; Lacy	J. Lacy	3:28

iTunes bonus track
No.	Title	Writer(s)	Producer(s)	Length
17.	"Go Girl" (Dance Mix) (featuring E-40)	Bryant; Jackson; Stevens	Moox	3:19

== Personnel ==
By Allmusic.

- Baby Bash: lead vocals, composer, executive producer
- Chris Athens: mastering
- C-Ballin: producer
- Printz Board: drum programming, engineer, keyboards, producer, vocal engineer, performer
- Todd Cooper: mixing
- Steve Dang: producer
- Howard "DJ Rex" Huang: mastering, mixing
- Michael Denten: mastering, mixing
- Happy P: mixing, producer
- James Hoover: mixing
- Chris Jackson: composer
- Mario "Tex" James: composer
- Marty James: performer, composer
- Jim Jonsin: producer, composer
- J. Lacy: mixing, performer
- John Lopez: executive producer
- Roy Mata: engineer
- Z-RO: performer, composer
- Jose Melendez: project manager
- David Newton: composer
- Ocies Groceries: producer
- Sergio Peña: project coordinator
- Lloyd Polite: performer, composer
- Elvin Reyes: artwork
- Manuel Rosenthal: composer
- Marc Rustigian: mastering
- Damon Sharpe: vocal engineer
- Paul Wall: performer, composer
- Adrian Sidney: photography
- Slim Thug: performer, composer
- Omar "O.C." Townsend: performer, composer
- Jay Tee: performer, composer
- Krizz Kaliko: performer, composer
- Michael Zibi: engineer, mixing, producer
- Dave Fore: mixing engineer
- Phil Fuger: engineer

== Chart positions ==
Chart	Position
US R&B/Hip-Hop Albums	38
