= Cyclone (Baby Bash album) =

Studio album by Baby Bash
- Released: October 30, 2007
- Recorded: 2006–2007
- Genres: Hip-hop; crunk; R&B
- Length: 52:42
- Labels: Latium; E.D.O.; Arista; J
- Producers: DJ Felli Fel; Happy Perez; Jim Jonsin; J. R. Rotem; Justin Trugman; Kookie; Lil' Jon; Peter Ramirez; Play-N-Skillz; Ryan Tedder; Scoop DeVille

Baby Bash chronology
Super Saucy (2005)	Cyclone (2007)	Bashtown (2011)

Singles from Cyclone
- 1. "Cyclone" Released: July 31, 2007; 2. "What Is It" Released: January 4, 2008

"Cyclone"
Baby Bash featuring Mickaël & T-Pain perform "Cyclone" from Cyclone

Cyclone is the fifth solo studio album by the American hip-hop recording artist Baby Bash. It was released on October 30, 2007 by Latium Entertainment, E.D.O. Entertainment, Arista Records and J Records. Production was handled by Happy Perez, J. R. Rotem, Ryan Tedder, DJ Felli Fel, Jim Jonsin, Justin Trugman, Kookie, Lil' Jon, Peter Ramirez, Play-N-Skillz and Scoop DeVille. It features guest appearances from Paula DeAnda, Aundrea Fimbres, Casely, Chingo Bling, Da Stooie Bros., Keith Sweat, Lucky Luciano, Marcos Hernandez, Mickaël Zibi, Mistah F.A.B., Pimp C, Queenie, Ryan Tedder, Sean Kingston and T-Pain.

The album debuted at number 30 on the US Billboard 200 and number 11 on the Top R&B/Hip-Hop Albums charts, selling about 26,000 copies in its first week. Cyclone is the first Baby Bash album not to contain a Parental Advisory sticker. There were three singles released from the album: "Cyclone", "What Is It" and "Don't Stop". The album's lead single, "Cyclone", reached No. 7 on the Billboard Hot 100 and later was certified two-times Platinum by the Recording Industry Association of America. Its second single, "What Is It", made it to No. 57 on the Billboard Hot 100, while its third single, "Don't Stop" only reached 22 on the Hot Rap Songs.

== Critical reception ==
Professional ratings
Review scores
Source	Rating
AllMusic	3/5 stars
Entertainment Weekly	C−
PopMatters	8/10
RapReviews	7.5/10

AllMusic' David Jeffries praised the album for its "pop moments" but said that the album is nothing "memorable". In the negative review, Simon Vozick-Levinson of Entertainment Weekly wrote: "Baby Bash himself is by far the weakest link. Though he fancies himself a sweet talker, clumsy lyrics such as "She wanna add me to her life like a MySpace friend" come off like cringeworthy pickup lines".

== Track listing ==
No.	Title	Writer(s)	Producer(s)	Length
1.	"Cyclone" (featuring T-Pain and Mickaël)	Ronald Ray Bryant; Faheem Najm; Jonathan Smith; Craig Love; LaMarquis Jefferson	Lil' Jon	3:44
2.	"Numero Uno"	Bryant; Kim Hoglund; Darrel Andrews; Joseph Scott	Kookie	2:54
3.	"Supa Chic" (featuring Paula DeAnda)	Bryant; Paula DeAnda; Jonathan Rotem; Mike Jones	J. R. Rotem	3:39
4.	"Just Like That"	Bryant; Oscar Salinas; Juan Salinas	Play-N-Skillz	2:19
5.	"What Is It" (featuring Sean Kingston)	Bryant; Rotem; Marty James; Scott Sterling; Lawrence Parker	J. R. Rotem	3:21
6.	"Mamacita" (featuring Marcos Hernandez)	Bryant; Elijah Molina; Frank Soto; Ernie Isley; Marvin Isley; O'Kelly Isley; Ronald Isley; Rudolph Isley; Chris Jasper	Scoop DeVille	4:02
7.	"Dip With You" (featuring Aundrea Fimbres)	Bryant; Ryan Tedder; Justin Trugman; Erick Coomes; DeAnda; Angel Noe	Ryan Tedder; Justin Trugman; Erick Coomes (co.)	3:20
8.	"Spreewells Spinnin' (Remix)" (featuring Queenie, Chingo Bling and Lucky Luciano)	Bryant; Cynthia Vasquez; Pedro Herrera; Christian Garcia; Peter Ramirez; Jeremy Hayes	Peter Ramirez	4:44
9.	"As Days Go By (The Love Letter)" (featuring Paula DeAnda)	Bryant; Nathan Perez; Alberto Cruz	Happy Perez	4:28
10.	"Na Na (The Yummy Song)" (featuring Casely)	Bryant; Jean Rodriguez; James Scheffer; Calvin Puckett; Frank Romano	Jim Jonsin	4:40
11.	"Thrill Is Gone" (featuring Ryan Tedder)	Bryant; Tedder	Ryan Tedder	4:26
12.	"Don't Stop" (featuring Keith Sweat)	Bryant; Keith Sweat; James Corrine	DJ Felli Fel	3:52
13.	"Mean Mug" (featuring Pimp C, Mistah F.A.B. & Da Stooie Bros.)	Bryant; Chad Butler; Stanley Cox; Noa; Rich Rappacon; Perez	Happy Perez	3:55
14.	"Ronnie Rey All Day... Choppin' It Up" (Interview)			3:05
Total length:				52:42

Sample credits

- "Numero Uno" contains a sample from "Let's Get Together" by Bobby Bland
- "What Is It" contains a portion of the composition "9MM Goes Bang" by Boogie Down Productions
- "Mamacita" contains a sample of "Voyage to Atlantis" by The Isley Brothers

== Charts ==
Chart (2007)	Peak position
US Billboard 200	30
US Billboard Top R&B/Hip-Hop Albums	11
