= Everything New =

Studio album by Natalie
- Released: September 19, 2006
- Genre: R&B
- Label: Universal
- Producers: Happy Perez, Bloodshy & Avant, Steve-O Valdez, Play-n-Skillz

Natalie chronology
Natalie (2005)	Everything New (2006)

Everything New is the second studio album by R&B singer Natalie Alvarado. Released September 19, 2006, it is the follow-up to Natalie's debut album Natalie. The album featured productions from Happy Perez, with whom she worked on her debut, but also worked with other producers, like Bloodshy & Avant and Play N Skillz.

The album's lead single was intended to be "Love You So", which was even released as a single on iTunes a month before the album's release, but the first single sent to radio from Everything New was "What You Gonna Do?", which features hip-hop tinges from Bun B, but failed to gain much attention. Due to the record label's lack of promotion for the album, and lack of radio support for the singles, Everything New failed to chart on the Billboard 200 albums chart, being two copies short of debuting at #200. It has since then sold less than 5,000 copies. The album's original track listing featured a song titled "Feels Good", but it was replaced by "When I Was With You" before it was released.

The album's unofficial lead single "Love You So" is actually an unlisted bonus track, as is Natalie's debut single "Goin' Crazy".

== Track listing ==
1. "What You Gonna Do" (featuring Bun B)
2. "All of My Life"
3. "My Candy"
4. "Pieces" (featuring Rob G)
5. "Dance with Me"
6. "Call Me Up"
7. "If You Only Knew" (featuring Play-n-Skillz)
8. "Heartbreaker"
9. "Slow Dance" (featuring Rob G)
10. "Turnin' Me On"
11. "When I Was with You"
12. "Everything New"
13. "Love You So" (bonus track)
14. "Goin' Crazy" (bonus track)
15. "Secrets" (Japanese edition)
