= Baeza (rapper) =

American rapper

- Born: Anthony Ray Baeza; May 3, 1993 (age 33); Fresno, California, United States
- Genres: Hip hop
- Occupations: Rapper; singer; songwriter; record producer
- Instrument: Digital audio workstation Diamond Lane Music Group Playamade Mexicanz Music Group
- Website: www.officialbaeza.com

Anthony Ray Baeza, better known by his stage name Baeza, (born May 3, 1993) is a Mexican American rapper, singer, record producer, and songwriter from Fresno, California. By 2009 Baeza was releasing his own singles and music videos, and his first mixtape, Dough and Dro, came out in early 2013. He has toured throughout the United States as a headliner at venues such as the Veterans Memorial Auditorium in California Fresno, and after the late 2013 release of his Right on Time EP he was featured as an "artist on the way to the top" in The Fresno Bee. Currently signed to Empire Distribution, he has collaborated with hip hop artists such as Clyde Carson and His Older Cousin Baby Bash, and in June 2015 he is due to release a full-length version of his The Man EP on EMPIRE Recordings. Baeza operates his own fashion line, Striktly Business, out of Fresno.

== Early life ==
Anthony Baeza was born in 1993 in Fresno, California, where he also spent his childhood. He started making music at around age thirteen, picking up hip hop production as a hobby. He soon started rapping over his own beats, and by seventeen he had decided he wanted to pursue music as a career. Encouraged by family members such as his father, early musical inspirations included hip hop artists such as Tupac.

== Music career ==
=== Early singles (2011–2013) ===
By 2011, Baeza had started to release his own singles, and one of his first music videos came out in December for "Far From Ready." In 2012 he also released videos for his tracks "Real Feelings," "Woah," "Can't Love You," and in December, "Slow Down." As of early 2013, Hit the Floor Magazine claimed that "Far From Ready" was one of his most popular songs. According to Baeza, the track was written "about an ex-girlfriend. We had broke up and all these feelings just hit me... and when I go through real life stuff, I write them in a song and that's how it came about."

=== Dough and Dro and Right on Time (2013) ===
His first full-length mixtape, Dough and Dro, came out in early 2013. The mixtape was hosted by DJ Meek. At that point Baeza had worked with artists such as Clyde Carson and Kap G, and though he was receiving attention from two major record labels, he chose to "hold off on signing to any record labels until I put out my first studio album." The Dough and Dro mixtape would be released on iTunes near the end of the year, on his own Baeza Music label. He also has his own fashion line, Stiktly Business, based out of Fresno.

For his 2013 Far From Ready tour Baeza performed thirteen stops in the United States with a DJ, ending the tour as a headlining act at the Veterans Memorial Auditorium in Fresno. He performed for a second time at the Fresno Veterans Memorial Auditorium to debut material from his new EP, Right on Time, which was his first studio album. The album was recorded at Tyme Studios in Fresno, and he described the project as being the first he had "sat down and made with a purpose," as compared to making mixtapes on the road. The first single was a remix of "Slip N Slide," one of his more popular songs. Baeza supported the new album on tour with 2Chainz, and after the late 2013 release of Right on Time he was featured as an "artist on the way to the top" in The Fresno Bee.

=== Recent projects (2014–2015) ===
Currently signed to Empire Distribution, in September 2014, his track "Roll With Me" was released with a feature by emcee Clyde Carson. It was later included on his second EP The Man, which came out on Baeza Music in August 2014. He shared stages with Roach Gigz on the California Nights Tour in the fall of 2014, and he also collaborated with Baby Bash on a video for "Certified Freaks." Baeza was a featured artist on "Like That" by DJ ASAP, which was included on the publication Noisey's On the Roof Vol. 1 mix on October 29, 2014. Wrote VICE, "with known factors Sage The Gemini and Baeza, as well as up-and-comers Symba, The Kid Ryan, and Milla, 'Like That' is a hit, and with ASAP's connections, [the song] already getting play up and down the coast." That month he was featured on the cover of Goder Magazine.

In July 2015, Baeza is due to release a full-length version of his The Man EP on EMPIRE Recordings.

== Discography ==
=== Albums ===
Albums by Baeza
Year	Album title	Release details
2015	The Man	Release date: July 31, 2015; Label: EMPIRE / Baeza Music; Format: Digital

=== EPs and mixtapes ===
EPs and mixtapes by Baeza
Year	Album title	Release details
2013	Right on Time EP	Released: November 12, 2013; Label: Baeza Music; Format: Digital
2013	Dough And Dro	Released: November 26, 2013; Label: Baeza Music; Format: Digital
2014	The Man EP	Released: August 5, 2014; Label: Baeza Music; Format: Digital

=== Singles ===
Incomplete list of songs by Baeza
Year	Title	Label	Release details
2011	"Far From Ready"	Baeza Music	Music video (December 3, 2011)
2012	"Real Feelings"	Baeza Music	Music video (March 21, 2012)
2012	"Woah" (feat. L!Z X TKR)	Baeza Music	Music video (July 20, 2012)
2012	"Can't Love You"	Baeza Music	(October 19, 2012)
2012	"Slow Down"	Baeza Music	(December 17, 2012)
2013	"Back It Up"	Baeza Music	(February 12, 2013)
2013	"On Tonight"	Baeza Music	(February 12, 2013)
2013	"Reminisce"	Baeza Music	(Feb 13), music video (March 14, 2013)
2013	"Smoke and F*ck"	Baeza Music	(December 20, 2013)
2013	"Wet" (with Lil Ro)	Baeza Music	(December 10, 2013)
2013	"Get Down on the Ground" (with Lucky Luciano	Thizz Latin Records	June 20, 2012)
2014	"Nothin Average" (feat. Philthy Rich)	EMPIRE	Music video (December 29, 2014)
2015	"Living It Up"	EMPIRE	Promo single for The Man (Jun 2015)

=== Guest appearances ===
Selected songs featuring Baeza
Year	Single name	Primary artist(s)	Album
2013	"Reminisce Remix" (ft. Baeza, Dizzy Wright)	Fashwan	n/a
2014	"Like That" (ft. Baeza, Symba, etc.)	Sage the Gemini	n/a
2014	"Certified Freak" (ft. Baeza and G. Curtis)	Baby Bash	Ronnie Rey All Day
2015	"Papi" (ft. Baeza and Baby Bash)	Jonn Hart	n/a

== See also ==
- Hyphy
