= On Tha Cool =

Studio album by Baby Beesh
- Released: June 11, 2002
- Genres: West Coast hip-hop; hip-hop
- Length: 68:52
- Label: Dope House Records
- Producers: Happy P; Johnny Z; Big Ice & Oral Bee from Da Playboy Foundation

Baby Beesh chronology
Savage Dreams (2001)	On Tha Cool (2002)	Tha Smokin' Nephew (2003)

Professional ratings
Review scores
Source	Rating
AllMusic	link
RapReviews	link

On Tha Cool is the second studio album by the American rapper Baby Beesh, released on June 11, 2002, on Dope House Records. It was produced by Happy P, Big Ice & Oral Bee from Da Playboy Foundation, and Johnny Z. The album has guest performances by South Park Mexican, Lucky Luciano, Jay Tee, Russell Lee, Don Cisco, Mr. Shadow and DJ Kane, among others.

The songs "Vamanos" and "They Don't Even Know" also appeared on the album Velvetism.

== Reception ==
The album was described by AllMusic containing "danceable beats", a reggae track, and some mellow tunes. The review concluded with a mixed review, stating that Baby Beesh was "floating in the middle" by how far the wording went.

== Track listing ==
#	Title	Featured Guest(s)	Length
1	"Intro (Aw Naw)"		4:11
2	"Feelin Me"	Russell Lee	4:09
3	"Vamanos"	Jay Tee; Merciless	4:13
4	"On tha Cool"	DJ Kane; Drew	4:18
5	"They Don't Even Know"	Jay Tee; Don Cisco	5:04
6	"Posted Up"		3:40
7	"Woy Oy"	Rasheed	5:01
8	"Dime Piece"	Russell Lee	4:08
9	"Too Many Things"	Grimm; Ayana	4:01
10	"Short Skirts"	South Park Mexican	3:47
11	"Hydro Luv"	Russell Lee	3:24
12	"Yesterday"	Russell Lee	2:09
13	"On da Go"	Ayana	3:53
14	"Head Hunta"	Powda; Tony Montana	3:27
15	"Early in da Mornin"	Mario Ayala; Meno Bay Bee	4:46
16	"In Motion"	Mr. Shadow	4:03
17	"Untitled" (Hidden Track)	Lucky Luciano	4:38
