= Anarchy (Neon Hitch album) =

Studio album by Neon Hitch
- Released: 22 July 2016
- Recorded: 2015–16
- Length: 49:10
- Label: #WeRNeon

Neon Hitch chronology
24:00 (2015)	Anarchy (2016)

Singles from Anarchy
- 1. "Please" Released: 8 July 2016

Anarchy is the debut studio album by British singer and songwriter Neon Hitch. It was released on 22 July 2016, by her own record label, #WeRNeon.

The album was preceded by the lead single "Please", which was released as an instant grat along with the album pre-order on 8 July. The song was featured in an episode of Million Dollar Matchmaker along with Neon herself.

The album served as a replacement for Eleutheromaniac, the unreleased 2014 album which was first announced after Hitch's split from Warner Bros. in 2014, alongside an IndieGoGo campaign that ultimately went underfunded on its $50,000 goal. Eleutheromaniac was supposed to include the previously released singles "Yard Sale", "Eleutheromaniac", "Sparks", and "Freedom".

Anarchy was released on 22 July 2016 and was met with critical acclaim from fans and blogs who praised Hitch's new sound and evolution since her early releases during her Warner Bros. days. The album includes a bonus track called "Freedom", which was released as a stand-alone single on 18 December along with a remix EP on iTunes.

The album was only released as a digital album until 2021, when it was released on a limited edition vinyl run of 301 copies.

== Background ==
On 11 May 2014, during a live chat, Hitch announced that after almost four years she had parted ways with Warner Bros. She also confirmed that her Beg, Borrow & Steal album was scrapped, and she would be releasing a new album titled Eleutheromaniac. She also announced that her mixtapes, Happy Neon and 301 to Paradise, would also be released to digital retailers on 20 May 2014. Throughout May 2014 and January 2015, Hitch released the singles "Yard Sale" and "Sparks", in order to promote the further release of Eleutheromaniac. On 1 March 2014 Hitch surprise-released the extended play 24:00, which, according to her, was recorded in 24 hours. On 22 April 2015, the title track, "Eleutheromaniac", was sent to digital retailers as an advancement of the album. Later, on 21 August, Hitch released the songs "Pussy Power" and "Kitty Power" (the latter a clean version of the former) on iTunes. Hitch was featured on Cash Cash's song "Devil", also featuring B.o.B and Busta Rhymes.

In May 2016, Hitch announced that her debut studio album would be titled Anarchy and its official release date is 22 July 2016. Hitch released the song "Please" as the lead single along with the pre-order of Anarchy, on 8 July 2016. Hitch released the album's track listing on 8 July 2016 through Twitter. In August 2016, Hitch made an appearance on the reality television series Million Dollar Matchmaker.

== Track listing ==
No.	Title	Writer(s)	Length
1.	"Intro"	Neon Hitch (Spoken)	0:56
2.	"Neighborhood"	Neon Hitch, Johnny Watt	3:33
3.	"Grade & Liquor" (featuring Collie Buddz)	Neon Hitch, Ki Fitzgerald, Collie Buddz	3:25
4.	"Anarchy"	Neon Hitch, Penny Christopher	3:17
5.	"Why"	Neon Hitch, Penny Christopher	3:16
6.	"Razorblade"	Neon Hitch, Johnny Humphrey, Nick Jariour	3:34
7.	"RDLN (Lines & Lust)"	Neon Hitch, Calix, Christopher Rockwell (Pop), Thrill Collins	3:39
8.	"Fried Chicken @ Night"	Neon Hitch, Penny Christopher	3:10
9.	"Boom"	Neon Hitch, Johnny What, Nick Jarjour	3:07
10.	"No. 1 Lady" (featuring Liam Horne)	Neon Hitch, Liam Horne	4:56
11.	"Let Dem Go" (featuring Calix)	Neon Hitch, Calix, Elvis Brown	5:07
12.	"Firetiger"	Neon Hitch, Rockwell, Dominique Sanders, Don Di Napoli, Jonah Christian, Thrill Collins	3:41
13.	"Please"	Neon Hitch	3:38
14.	"Freedom"	Neon Hitch, Jomar Torres, Ronny Svendesen, Sam Trocki	3:51
Total length:			49:10
