= 24:00 (EP) =

EP by Neon Hitch
- Released: 1 March 2015
- Recorded: 2015
- Label: WeRNeon
- Producers: Neon Hitch; Yonny; JGramm; Sam Trocki; Daniel Lynas; KC; Elias Gwinn

Neon Hitch chronology
| 301 to Paradise (2014) | 24:00 (2015) | Anarchy (2016) |

24:00 is the third extended play (EP) by English singer Neon Hitch. It was released on 1 March 2015 by WeRNeon. The project was written, recorded and mixed by Hitch and various collaborators over the course of twenty-four hours, the day prior to release. Hitch chose the release date as she considers "301" to be her lucky number and the first day of the third month would reflect the number.

== Songs ==
Hitch says that "On the Run" is a "ghetto gypsy swag song." "Get Me High" has "soothing melodies" that "will seriously get you high" and "offers the listener a feeling of tranquility, even if it’s just a mental high." "Back Against the Wall" is a "jolting anthem for standing up for what’s right," while "Lost at Sea" brings out Hitch’s "marvellous vocal ability and her fanciful gift for beautiful songwriting."

== Track listing ==
| No. | Title | Writer(s) | Producer(s) | Length |
|---|---|---|---|---|
| 1. | "On the Run" | Neon Hitch; Bianca Atterberry | Yonny | 3:02 |
| 2. | "London Bitch" | Hitch | JGramm | 1:59 |
| 3. | "Wake Me When It’s Over" | Hitch; Sam Trocki | Hitch; Trocki | 3:37 |
| 4. | "Get Me High" | Hitch; Daniel Lynas | Lynas | 2:08 |
| 5. | "Back Against the Wall" | Hitch | KC | 2:55 |
| 6. | "Lost at Sea" | Hitch | Lynas; Elias Gwinn | 1:52 |
