= Natalie (Natalie album) =

Studio album by Natalie
- Released: May 17, 2005
- Length: 49:08
- Label: Universal
- Producer: Happy Perez; Baby Bash; Eddie Guardian; Russell Lee; Davion Botts; Rob Williams

Natalie chronology
Natalie (2005)	Everything New (2006)

Natalie is the first album by American singer Natalie Nicole Alvarado. It was released by Universal Records on May 17, 2005. Chiefly produced by Happy Perez, the album debuted at number 16 on the US Billboard 200, selling over 50,000 copies in its first week.

== Promotion ==
The album features Natalie's debut single "Goin' Crazy", which peaked at number 13 on Billboard's US Hot 100 chart. Follow-up single "Energy", which features Baby Bash, became a minor hit, peaking at number 66 on the Billboard Hot 100 in the summer of 2005; no video was produced for the single. The third single to be released was "Where Are You", featuring Justin Roman, which he had originally recorded a year prior with Latin girl group Soluna, but was scrapped.

== Critical reception ==
Professional ratings
Review scores
Source	Rating
AllMusic	3.5/5 stars

AllMusic editor Jason Birchmeier found that "if you're down with the other Latium artists, or if you like fellow urban pop sweethearts like Ciara, Natalie is tailor-made to suit your taste. Plus, there's a curious pair of covers that make the album all the more inviting: an American Idol-style number featuring Justin Roman of Making the Band ("Where Are You") and a Spanish-language version of "Goin' Crazy" that just might top the original."

== Commercial performance ==
The album debuted and peaked at number 16 on the US Billboard 200.

== Track listing ==
Natalie track listing
No.	Title	Writer(s)	Producer(s)	Length
1.	"Goin' Crazy"	Natalie Nicole Alvarado, Eddie Montgomery, Davion Botts	Eddie Guardian, D. Botts	4:54
2.	"Energy" (featuring Baby Bash)	Alvarado, Ronald Bryant, Nathan Perez	Happy Perez	3:30
3.	"Better Get It Right" (featuring Max Minelli)	Alvarado, Francisco Bautista, Max Minelli, Perez	Happy Perez	3:38
4.	"Ooh"	Alvarado, Perez	Happy Perez	4:38
5.	"You Don't Love Me No More"	Alvarado, Russell Atkins, Perez	Happy Perez	3:21
6.	"I Can't Wait"	John Smith	Happy Perez, DJ Lordwin	3:19
7.	"Stay"	Alvarado, Perez	Happy Perez	4:09
8.	"Something About You" (featuring Russell Lee)	Alvarado, Atkins, Perez	Happy Perez	3:50
9.	"You're the One"	Alvarado, Perez	Happy Perez	4:36
10.	"Emptiness"	Alvarado, Bryant, Perez	Happy Perez, Baby Bash	4:16
11.	"Where Are You" (with Justin Roman) (bonus track)	Alvarado, Justin Roman, Rob Williams	Rob Williams	4:04
12.	"Me Faltas Tú" (bonus track)	Alvarado, Bautista, Montgomery, Botts	Eddie Guardian, D. Botts	4:53
Total length:				49:08

Digital bonus track
No.	Title	Length
13.	"Goin' Crazy" (breakbeat mix)	3:50

Rhapsody and US digital bonus track
No.	Title	Length
13.	"Goin' Crazy" (dance mix)	7:54

== Charts ==
Chart performance for Natalie
Chart (2005)	Peak position
US Billboard 200	16
