= Savage Dreams =

Studio album by Baby Beesh
- Released: June 19, 2001
- Recorded: 2001
- Studios: Dope House Records (Houston, TX); Digital Services (Houston, TX)
- Genres: Southern hip-hop; Latin hip-hop; West Coast hip-hop
- Length: 70:29
- Label: Dope House Records
- Producers: B.R.; Happy Perez; Hotan; Jaime "Pain" Ortiz; Mario Ayala

Baby Beesh chronology
| Latino Velvet Project (1997) | Savage Dreams (2001) | On Tha Cool (2002) |

Professional ratings
Review scores
| Source | Rating |
|---|---|
| AllMusic | 3/5 stars |

Savage Dreams is the debut solo studio album by the American rapper Baby Beesh. It was released on June 19, 2001, via Dope House Records. Recording sessions took place at Dope House Records and Digital Services in Houston. Production was handled by Happy Perez, Mario Ayala, Hotan, B.R. and Jaime "Pain" Ortiz, with Arthur Coy Jr. and South Park Mexican serving as executive producers. It features guest appearances from 713, B.R., Don Cisco, Dum Dum, Frost, Grimm, Jay Tee, Lil' Villain, Lucky Luciano, Merciless, Mr. Kee, Rasheed, Russell Lee, Sneak, SPM, Travieso, T.O. Ikeman and fellow Latino Velvet members.

The album shows a mixture of West Coast hip-hop style with a Southern hip-hop flow in beats.

The song "Styrofoam Cup" originally appeared on the South Park Mexican 2000 compilation album The Purity Album.

== Track listing ==
| No. | Title | Producer(s) | Length |
|---|---|---|---|
| 1. | "WhoDoo" | Mario Ayala | 3:59 |
| 2. | "QuarterBack" (featuring Mr. Kee) | Happy Perez | 2:10 |
| 3. | "Watch How Quick" | Mario Ayala | 4:06 |
| 4. | "NRG" (featuring South Park Mexican, Rasheed and Russell Lee) | Happy Perez | 3:37 |
| 5. | "Nice Ta Meet Ya" (featuring Russell Lee and Ayana M) | Happy Perez | 3:40 |
| 6. | "Too Many Things" (featuring Grimm and Ayana M) | Mario Ayala | 4:03 |
| 7. | "Who Wanna Creep" (featuring Latino Velvet) | | 3:39 |
| 8. | "Na Na Tonight" (featuring Ayana M) | Mario Ayala | 4:13 |
| 9. | "Blowin on Fire" | Happy Perez | 2:46 |
| 10. | "Brain" (featuring Lucky Luciano and Ayana M) | Mario Ayala | 4:23 |
| 11. | "So Pronto" (featuring Grimm and Russell Lee) | Happy Perez | 3:57 |
| 12. | "Already" (featuring Travieso) | Hotan Kheyrandish | 3:12 |
| 13. | "Cool Tonight" (featuring Merciless and Russell Lee) | Happy Perez | 3:52 |
| 14. | "Styrofoam Cup" (featuring Grimm, Lil' Villain, Russell Lee, T.O. Ikeman and 713) | Happy Perez | 3:32 |
| 15. | "Woo Woo" | Hotan Kheyrandish | 3:32 |
| 16. | "Crossing Game" (featuring Jay Tee, Frost, Sneak and B.R.) | B.R. | 3:50 |
| 17. | "Whupanigga" (featuring Dum Dum) | Jaime "Pain" Ortiz | 3:43 |
| 18. | "Na Na Get Wet" (featuring Grimm, Rasheed and South Park Mexican) | Happy Perez | 5:10 |
| 19. | "Come on Now" (featuring Don Cisco and Rasheed) | Happy Perez | 3:05 |
| Total length: | | | 1:10:29 |

== Personnel ==
- Ronnie "Baby Beesh" Bryant – vocals
- Juan Carlos "Mr. Kee" Oliva – vocals (track 2)
- Carlos "South Park Mexican" Coy – vocals (tracks: 4, 18), executive producer
- Alfonso "Rasheed" Cook – vocals (tracks: 4, 18, 19)
- Russell Atkins – backing vocals (tracks: 4, 5, 11, 13), vocals (track 14)
- Ayana Mack – backing vocals (tracks: 5, 6, 8, 10)
- Paul Anthony "Grimm" Ramirez – vocals (tracks: 6, 14, 18), backing vocals (track 11)
- Latino Velvet – vocals (track 7)
- Christian Anthony "Lucky Luciano" Garcia – vocals (track 10)
- Travieso – vocals (track 12)
- Marco "Merciless" Parada – vocals (track 13)
- Gabriel "Lil' Villain" Aguilar – vocals (track 14)
- Isaac R. "T.O. Ikeman" Sanchez – vocals (track 14)
- 713 – vocals (track 14)
- James "Jay Tee" Trujillo – vocals (track 16)
- Arturo "Kid Frost" Mollina Jr. – vocals (track 16)
- Sneak – vocals (track 16)
- B.R. – vocals & producer (track 16)
- Roland "Dum Dum" Sampey – vocals (track 17)
- Francisco "Don Cisco" Soto – vocals (track 19)
- Erroll "Poppi" McCalla Jr. – brass (track 10)
- Mario Andretti Ayala – producer (tracks: 1, 3, 6, 8, 10)
- Nathan "Happy Perez" Pérez – producer (tracks: 2, 4, 5, 9, 11, 13, 14, 18, 19)
- Hotan Kheyrandish – producer (tracks: 12, 15)
- Jaime "Pain" Ortiz – producer (track 17), engineering
- "Big Bert" Trevino – engineering
- Jose "Block Of Rock" De Leon – engineering
- Pete "Dirtywerk" Camarillo – engineering
- Randy "Shadow" Ramirez – arranger, mixing
- James Hoover – arranger, mixing
- Gary L. Moon – mastering
- Arthur Coy Jr. – executive producer
- Alex "Lobo" Hernandez – art direction, A&R
- Pen & Pixel Graphics – cover, design
- Mike Frost – layout
