= What Is It =

Single by Baby Bash featuring Sean Kingston

from the album Cyclone
- Released: January 4, 2008
- Recorded: 2007
- Genre: Hip hop; R&B
- Length: 3:21
- Label: Arista
- Songwriters: Ronald Ray Bryant; Jonathan Rotem; Marty James; Scott Sterling; Lawrence Parker
- Producer: J. R. Rotem

Baby Bash singles chronology
"Cyclone" (2007)	"What Is It" (2008)	"Teardrops" (2008)

Sean Kingston singles chronology
"Take You There" (2007)	"What Is It" (2008)	"That's Gangsta" (2008)

"What Is It" is a song recorded by American recording artists Baby Bash featuring Sean Kingston for Baby Bash's fifth solo studio album, Cyclone (2007). It was released on January 4, 2008, by Arista Records as the second single. It was written by Baby Bash, Marty James, and J. R. Rotem, who also produced it. The song contains a sample of "9MM Goes Bang" performed by KRS-One.

== Track listing ==
US CD Promo

1. "What Is It" (Album Version) – 3:21
2. "What Is It" (Call Out Hook) – 0:10

== Charts ==
Chart (2008)	Peak position
Australia (ARIA)	83
Australian Urban (ARIA)	19
US Billboard Hot 100	57
US Pop Airplay (Billboard)	38
US Hot Rap Songs (Billboard)	12

== Release history ==
Release dates and formats for "What Is It"
Region	Date	Format	Label(s)	Ref.
United States	January 15, 2008	Mainstream airplay	Arista	
