= Goin' Crazy (Natalie song) =

Single by Natalie

from the album Natalie
- Released: February 22, 2005
- Recorded: 2004
- Studio: Gray's Crib, Houston, Texas
- Genre: Pop, R&B
- Length: 4:54 (album version); 3:54 (radio version)
- Label: Universal
- Songwriters: Natalie Alvarado; Eddie Montgomery; Davion Botts
- Producers: Guardian & D. Botts

Natalie singles chronology
"Come on and Shake Your Body" (2004)	"Goin' Crazy" (2005)	"Energy" (2005)

Music video
- "Goin' Crazy" on YouTube

"Goin' Crazy" is a song written and performed by American singer Natalie. It was released as her debut single from the album Natalie in the United States as a digital download on February 22, 2005, and as a CD single on March 15, 2005.

== Song background ==
Natalie was initially signed to Latium Entertainment as a rapper before she began singing hooks. She had become known within the underground rap circles in her hometown of Houston, Texas that originally caught the attention of her production team. While working on her own material, Natalie was asked to sing hooks for other artists' tracks. "Goin' Crazy" was the first singing song Natalie wrote, and "That's why it has that rap [like] monologue going on..."

A radio program director in Tulsa, Oklahoma found the original mp3 and immediately began to spin it in regular rotation. Quickly, the song became the number one most requested on the radio station and went into power rotation leading to other radio programmers taking notice of the single.

== Music video ==
The music video for "Goin' Crazy" was directed by Ray Kay.

After Natalie's partner leaves her to go on tour, she's seen walking through her neighborhood in slow motion. At the end, her partner appears on TV, mentioning his absence from Natalie.

== Track listings and formats ==
Digital download EP
Released February 22, 2005

1. "Goin' Crazy" (radio version) – 3:54
2. "Goin' Crazy" – 4:53
3. "Goin' Crazy" (instrumental version) – 4:54

US CD single
B0004381-32; released March 15, 2005

1. "Goin' Crazy" (main) – 4:54
2. "Goin' Crazy" (remix; Urban mix featuring Big Gem) – 4:16
3. "Goin' Crazy" (instrumental) – 4:54
4. "Goin' Crazy" (dance mix) – 7:53

== Chart performance ==
"Goin' Crazy" first entered the Billboard Rhythmic chart in December 2004, and reached the Billboard Hot 100 in February 2005, ultimately peaking at number 13 in April 2005. It debuted and peaked at number 75 in Australia in June 2005.

=== Weekly charts ===
Chart (2004–2005)	Peak position
Australia (ARIA)	75
Australian Urban (ARIA)	23
US Billboard Hot 100	13
US Pop Airplay (Billboard)	9
US Rhythmic Airplay (Billboard)	4

=== Year-end charts ===
Chart (2005)	Position
US Billboard Hot 100	70
US Billboard Pop 100	53
