= Gold (Neon Hitch song) =

Single by Neon Hitch featuring Tyga
- Released: 10 August 2012
- Recorded: 2011
- Genre: Dance-pop; synthpop
- Length: 3:53
- Label: Reprise Records
- Songwriters: Neon Hitch; Claude Kelly; Benjamin Levin; Phillip Lawrence; Bruno Mars
- Producers: Benny Blanco; The Smeezingtons

Neon Hitch singles chronology
"Fuck U Betta" (2012)	"Gold" (2012)	"Yard Sale" (2014)

Tyga singles chronology
"Make It Nasty" (2012)	"Gold" (2012)	"Celebration" (2012)

"Gold" is a song by British singer Neon Hitch featuring American rapper Tyga. It was released on 14 August 2012 as the second single from her unreleased debut album Beg, Borrow & Steal. The song reached number one on the Billboard Hot Dance Club Play chart.

== Background and composition ==
"Gold" was written by Hitch with help from fellow songwriter Claude Kelly as well as producer Benny Blanco and the production team, "The Smeezingtons", the latter two produced the track. "Gold" draws from dance-pop and synthpop genres. In the chorus, the synths fade away as Hitch sings "There's no light in this room / it's alright we got you / you shine like Gold". As the chorus ends, a heavy synth begins and Neon Hitch uses her sing-talk style to continue through the verse. Neon Hitch's style in the chorus was compared to pop singer Britney Spears.

== Critical reception ==
Pop Crush called the single "pure pop bliss", complimenting the catchy lyrics of the song and a better single choice than its predecessor, "Fuck U Betta", because of the more appropriate subject matter.

== Music video ==
Neon uploaded a lyric video on her YouTube account on 16 August 2012. Her manager has confirmed that they plan on shooting the video sometime in September so that it wouldn't conflict with Tyga's schedule. As of 30 December 2012 neither Neon or Tyga have released the video or scheduled a release date for it.

== Live performances ==
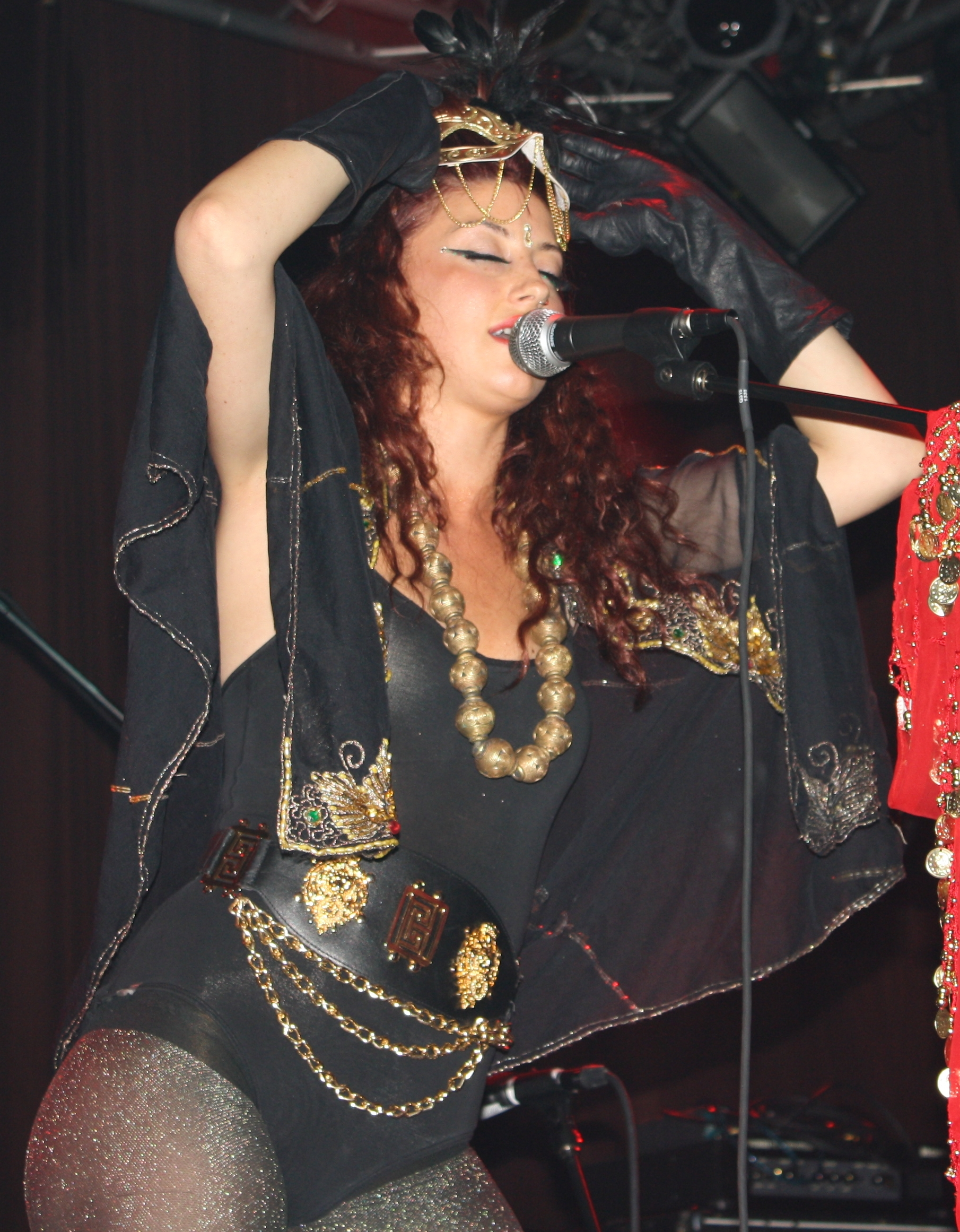
Neon Hitch in Highline Ballroom, New York.

Neon Hitch has performed the song at the Highline Ballroom in New York. Hitch has also performed the song on the American talk show Late Night with Jimmy Fallon.

== Track listing ==
Digital download
No.	Title	Length
1.	"Gold" (featuring Tyga)	3:53

Remixes EP
No.	Title	Length
1.	"Gold" (featuring Tyga)	3:23
2.	"Gold" (featuring Tyga) (Ralphi Rosario Radio Remix)	3:54
3.	"Gold" (featuring Tyga) (Disco Fries Club Remix)	5:18
4.	"Gold" (featuring Tyga) (Smash Mode Radio Remix)	3:57
5.	"Gold" (featuring Tyga) (Ashworth Club Mix)	4:37
6.	"Gold" (Ralphi Rosario Dub)	7:25

== Charts ==
Chart (2012–13)	Peak position
South Korean International Digital Chart	97
US Hot Dance Club Songs (Billboard)	1

== Release history ==
Region	Date	Format	Label
Spain	10 August 2012	Digital download	Warner Bros. Records
United States	14 August 2012	Digital download	Warner Bros. Records
United Kingdom	14 August 2012	Digital download	Warner Bros. Records

== See also ==
- List of number-one dance singles of 2013 (U.S.)
