= Cyclone (song) =

Single by Baby Bash featuring T-Pain

from the album Cyclone
- Released: July 31, 2007
- Genre: Crunk
- Length: 3:43 (single version); 3:58 (album version)
- Label: Arista
- Songwriters: Ronald Bryant; Faheem Najm; Jonathan Smith; Craig Love; LaMarquis Jefferson
- Producer: Lil Jon

Baby Bash singles chronology
"Na Na (The Yummy Song)" (2007)	"Cyclone" (2007)	"What Is It" (2008)

T-Pain singles chronology
"Shawty" (2007)	"Cyclone" (2007)	"I'm So Hood" (2007)

"Cyclone"
Baby Bash featuring T-Pain & Mickaël Zibi perform "Cyclone" from Cyclone

"Cyclone" is the second single by American rapper Baby Bash from his album of the same name. The song features T-Pain on the last verse and Mickaël Zibi on the intro and chorus though he is only credited on the album. The song was produced by Lil Jon and the song's musical structure incorporates typical Roland TR-808 crisp Southern hip-hop dance claps, basslines, and pizzicatos, as well as Lil Jon's signature crunk synths and whistles. The Recording Industry Association of America certified the song as double platinum. The song peaked at number 7 on the Billboard Hot 100.

== Music video ==
The "Cyclone" video was directed by Malcolm Jones. It premiered on August 6, 2007 on Yahoo! Music. The music video takes place in a strip club.

== Remix ==
On November 26, the official remix released which features T-Pain and rappers Hurricane Chris and Gorilla Zoe.

== Chart performance ==
On the Billboard Hot 100, the song debuted at number 65 on the issue dated August 11, 2007. It reached the top 40 at number 33 on September 15, 2007, and peaked at number 7 on November 3, 2007, for two weeks.

== Charts ==
=== Weekly charts ===
Chart (2007–2008)	Peak position
Canada Hot 100 (Billboard)	41
US Billboard Hot 100	7
US Hot R&B/Hip-Hop Songs (Billboard)	70
US Hot Rap Songs (Billboard)	6
US Pop Airplay (Billboard)	11
US Rhythmic Airplay (Billboard)	3

=== Year-end charts ===
Chart (2007)	Position
US Billboard Hot 100	84
US Rhythmic (Billboard)	18
Chart (2008)	Position
US Billboard Hot 100	71

== Certifications ==
Region	Certification	Certified units/sales
New Zealand (RMNZ)	Gold	15,000^{‡}
United States (RIAA)	2× Platinum	2,000,000^{*}
United States (RIAA) Mastertone	Platinum	1,000,000^{*}
^{*} Sales figures based on certification alone.^{‡} Sales+streaming figures based on certification alone.
