= Suga Suga =

2003 single by Baby Bash featuring Frankie J

Single by Baby Bash featuring Frankie J

from the album Tha Smokin' Nephew
- B-side: "Feelin Me"; "Early in da Morning"
- Released: July 21, 2003
- Studio: Digital Services (Houston, Texas)
- Length: 3:59
- Label: Universal
- Songwriters: Ronald Bryant; Francisco Bautista
- Producer: Happy Perez

Baby Bash singles chronology
"Shorty Doowop" (2003)	"Suga Suga" (2003)	"Baby, I'm Back" (2005)

Frankie J singles chronology
"Ya No Es Igual" (2003)	"Suga Suga" (2003)	"Obsession (No Es Amor)" (2005)

"Suga Suga" is a song by American rapper Baby Bash featuring Mexican-American singer Frankie J. Written by both singers, the song was released on July 21, 2003, as the second and final single from Baby Bash's third studio album, Tha Smokin' Nephew (2003). It is Baby Bash's highest-charting song on the US Billboard Hot 100, reaching number seven, and it appeared on several international rankings, including the New Zealand Singles Chart, where it peaked at number one for three weeks. It has received sales certifications in Australia, Germany, New Zealand, the United Kingdom, and the United States.

"Suga Suga" was interpolated in the 2015 song "Sugar" by German DJ Robin Schulz and the 2025 song "If She Could See Me Now" by New Zealand singer Lorde.

== Music video ==
The music video for "Suga Suga", filmed in New York City, shows Baby Bash and Frankie J in a car stuck in traffic, Frankie J turns on the video screen in Bash's Escalade. A UPS delivery woman (Jessica Sutta) in a low-cut shirt walks up, catching Bash and J's attention. She smiles at Bash and J as she walks by while the two sit on a porch with other men playing instruments. Bash and J watch the events in their car while jamming. Sitting on the porch, Bash and J throw peace signs to two other ladies who walk by. The neighbor girl upstairs throws down a flower to J, he smiles and throws a peace sign. A telephone repair woman dancing credited as the Call Girl catches the eye of Bash, and he dances with the Call Girl. A policewoman holding a stop sign, lets two women wearing low-cut school uniforms cross the road, all three then proceed to flirt with Bash and J. Bash pretends to paddle the policewoman with her stop sign. On Groovy Way, an ice cream woman dances with Bash. Bash walks the street dancing with other women and then dances with a female DJ. At a lounge, Bash, J, and other women dance. After watching the events in their car, it is shown Bash and J are escorting three women, who are in the back seat.

== Track listings ==
US and Australian CD single

1. "Suga Suga" – 4:03
2. "Suga Suga" (instrumental) – 4:03
3. "Suga Suga" (a cappella) – 3:26
4. "Feelin Me" – 4:09
5. "Early in da Morning" – 4:46

European CD single

1. "Suga Suga" – 3:59
2. "Suga Suga" (remix) – 4:05

European maxi-CD single

1. "Suga Suga" – 3:59
2. "Suga Suga" (remix) – 4:05
3. "Sexy Eyes (Da Da Da Da)" – 4:29
4. "Suga Suga" (video)

== Credits and personnel ==
Credits are lifted from Tha Smokin' Nephew booklet.

Studio

- Recorded and mastered at Digital Services (Houston, Texas)

Personnel

- Baby Bash – writing (as Ronald Bryant), vocals
- Frankie J – writing (as Francisco Bautista), featured vocals
- Happy Perez – production, recording, mixing
- James Hoover – mixing
- Gary Moon – mastering

== Charts ==
=== Weekly charts ===
Chart (2003–2004)	Peak position
Australia (ARIA)	3
Austria (Ö3 Austria Top 40)	8
Belgium (Ultratip Bubbling Under Flanders)	6
Belgium (Ultratop 50 Wallonia)	8
Canada CHR (Nielsen BDS)	5
Czech Republic (IFPI)	12
Denmark (Tracklisten)	13
Europe (Eurochart Hot 100)	7
France (SNEP)	11
Germany (GfK)	4
Hungary (Dance Top 40)	20
Hungary (Editors' Choice Top 40)	38
Italy (FIMI)	39
Netherlands (Dutch Top 40)	30
Netherlands (Single Top 100)	45
New Zealand (Recorded Music NZ)	1
Poland (PiF PaF)	18
Romania (Romanian Top 100)	91
Sweden (Sverigetopplistan)	28
Switzerland (Schweizer Hitparade)	2
US Billboard Hot 100	7
US Hot R&B/Hip-Hop Songs (Billboard)	54
US Hot Rap Songs (Billboard)	10
US Pop Airplay (Billboard)	2
US Rhythmic Airplay (Billboard)	2

=== Year-end charts ===
Chart (2003)	Position
US Billboard Hot 100	77
US Mainstream Top 40 (Billboard)	83
US Rhythmic Top 40 (Billboard)	8

Chart (2004)	Position
Australia (ARIA)	10
Austria (Ö3 Austria Top 40)	60
Belgium (Ultratop 50 Wallonia)	39
France (SNEP)	57
Germany (Media Control GfK)	32
New Zealand (RIANZ)	9
Switzerland (Schweizer Hitparade)	15
US Billboard Hot 100	46
US Mainstream Top 40 (Billboard)	21
US Rhythmic Top 40 (Billboard)	44

== Certifications ==
Region	Certification	Certified units/sales
Australia (ARIA)	Platinum	70,000^{^}
Germany (BVMI)	Gold	150,000^{‡}
New Zealand (RMNZ)	4× Platinum	120,000^{‡}
United Kingdom (BPI)	Silver	200,000^{‡}
United States (RIAA)	4× Platinum	4,000,000^{‡}
^{^} Shipments figures based on certification alone.^{‡} Sales+streaming figures based on certification alone.

== Release history ==
Region	Date	Format(s)	Label(s)	Ref.
United States	July 21, 2003	Rhythmic contemporary radio	Universal	
United States	August 5, 2003	CD	Universal	
United States	September 15, 2003	Urban radio	Universal	
Australia	February 23, 2004	CD	Universal	
