= Baby, I'm Back (song) =

2005 single by Baby Bash

Single by Baby Bash featuring Akon

from the album Super Saucy
- B-side: "Keep It 100"
- Released: January 18, 2005
- Length: 3:39
- Label: Universal
- Songwriters: Ronnie Bryant; Aliaune Thiam
- Producer: Akon

Baby Bash singles chronology
"Suga Suga" (2003)	"Baby, I'm Back" (2005)	"Who wit' Me?" (2005)

Akon singles chronology
"Ghetto" (2004)	"Baby, I'm Back" (2005)	"Lonely" (2005)

"Baby, I'm Back" is a song by American rapper Baby Bash featuring vocals from Senegalese-American singer Akon. It was released on January 18, 2005, as the first single from Baby Bash's fourth studio album, Super Saucy (2005).

== Commercial performance ==
"Baby, I'm Back" peaked at number 19 on the US Billboard Hot 100 and number nine on the Billboard Hot Rap Songs chart. On October 4, 2005, Baby, I'm Back was certified gold by the Recording Industry Association of America (RIAA) for selling 500,000 copies. The song also found success on Canadian radio, reaching number 26 on the Radio & Records CHR/Pop Top 30 chart.

== Music video ==
A music video was released to promote the single. The video was directed by Jessy Terrero and produced by Josh Goldstein.

== Track listing ==
- CD single
1. "Baby I'm Back" (album version)
2. "Baby I'm Back" (Dan Strong remix)
3. "Keep It 100" (featuring E-40 and Bosco)
4. "Baby I'm Back" (video featuring Akon)

== Charts ==
=== Weekly charts ===
Chart (2005)	Peak position
Canada CHR/Pop Top 30 (Radio & Records)	26
US Billboard Hot 100	19
US Hot R&B/Hip-Hop Songs (Billboard)	52
US Hot Rap Songs (Billboard)	9
US Pop Airplay (Billboard)	14
US Rhythmic Airplay (Billboard)	3

=== Year-end charts ===
Chart (2005)	Position
US Mainstream Top 40 (Billboard)	43
US Rhythmic Top 40 (Billboard)	17

== Certifications ==
Region	Certification	Certified units/sales
Brazil (Pro-Música Brasil)	Gold	30,000^{‡}
New Zealand (RMNZ)	Platinum	30,000^{‡}
United States (RIAA)	Gold	500,000^{*}
^{*} Sales figures based on certification alone.^{‡} Sales+streaming figures based on certification alone.

== Release history ==
Region	Date	Format(s)	Label(s)	Ref.
United States	January 18, 2005	Rhythmic contemporary radio	Universal	
United States	March 21, 2005	Contemporary hit radio	Universal	
