= Fuck U Betta =

Single by Neon Hitch
- Released: 31 January 2012
- Recorded: 2011
- Length: 3:23
- Label: Reprise
- Songwriters: Neon Hitch; Lauren Christy; Victor Alexander
- Producers: Benny Blanco; Victor Alexander

Neon Hitch singles chronology
"Ass Back Home" (2011)	"Fuck U Betta" (2012)	"Gold" (2012)

"Fuck U Betta" (stylized as "F**k U Betta"), also known as "Love U Betta" or "F U Betta" in clean versions, is the debut single by British singer Neon Hitch. The song reached number one on the Billboard Hot Dance Club Play chart and number 29 on the Billboard Pop Songs chart.

== Background and release ==
Discussing the inspiration of the song, Hitch said:

I re-wrote "Fuck U Betta" with my friends Lauren and Vic in Toronto after I had broken up with a boyfriend, who had told me that he started dating a model. I was like, 'Yeah, she's prettier than I'll ever be, but can she do it like me?' Then we gave it to Benny, and Benny was freaking out over it."

"Fuck U Betta" was digitally released on 31 January 2012.

== Composition ==
Lewis Corner of Digital Spy described the composition as "a quirky mix of squiffy vocal effects, pulsing club beats and plenty of bad language".

== Chart performance ==
On its sixth week in the chart, "Fuck U Betta" reached number one on the Billboard Hot Dance Club Play chart for the issue dated 17 March 2012. According to Nielsen SoundScan, the song had sold 28,000 downloads by March 2012.

== Music video ==
The official music video for "Fuck U Betta" was directed by Chris Applebaum. It shows Hitch in black and white backgrounds sitting on a chair. A scene includes Hitch on the floor with black paint spilling on her. It was uploaded onto Hitch's official YouTube channel on 8 March 2012 in both explicit and clean versions. The video has been taken down as of December 17, 2018 by her previous label for unknown reasons.

== Track listing ==
Digital download 1
No.	Title	Length
1.	"F**k U Betta"	3:23

Digital download 2 (clean version)
No.	Title	Length
1.	"Love U Betta"	3:21

Remixes EP
No.	Title	Length
1.	"F**k U Betta"	3:23
2.	"F**k U Betta" (DJ Chuckie Club Remix)	5:11
3.	"F**k U Betta" (Felix Cartal Club Remix)	4:13
4.	"F**k U Betta" (Dave Audé Radio Remix)	4:06
5.	"F**k U Betta" (LA Riots Club Remix)	5:56
6.	"F**k U Betta" (Abe Clements Radio Remix)	3:32

== Charts ==
=== Weekly charts ===
Chart (2012)	Peak position
Lebanon (The Official Lebanese Top 20)	17
Romania (Airplay 100)	77
Sweden (Sverigetopplistan)	58
US Mainstream Top 40 (Billboard)	29
US Hot Dance Club Songs (Billboard)	1

== Release history ==
Region	Date	Format	Label
Spain	31 January 2012	Digital download	Warner Bros. Records
United States	31 January 2012	Digital download	Warner Bros. Records
United Kingdom	31 January 2012	Digital download	Warner Bros. Records
United States	28 February 2012	Mainstream and Rhythmic airplay	Warner Bros. Records

== See also ==
- List of number-one dance singles of 2012 (U.S.)
