= Tha Smokin' Nephew =

Studio album by Baby Bash
- Released: September 23, 2003
- Recorded: 2002–03
- Studio: Digital Services (Houston, Texas); The Clinic (Houston); Dope House Records (Houston); R&D Studios (Albuquerque, New Mexico); Lydkjøkkenet (Oslo, Norway)
- Genre: Hip-hop
- Length: 70:25
- Label: Latium; Universal
- Producer: Big Ice; Happy Perez; Mario Ayala; Mike Cee; Oral Bee; Shadow Ramirez

Baby Bash chronology
On Tha Cool (2002)	Tha Smokin' Nephew (2003)	Super Saucy (2005)

Singles from Tha Smokin' Nephew
- 1. "Suga Suga" Released: July 21, 2003; 2. "Shorty Doowop" Released: February 17, 2004

Tha Smokin' Nephew is the third solo studio album by American rapper Baby Bash. It was released on September 23, 2003, through Latium Entertainment and Universal Records, making it his first commercial album as well as his first album released under the stage name "Baby Bash" (the previous two albums were recorded by him as "Baby Beesh").

Recording sessions took place at Digital Services, The Clinic and Dope House Records in Houston, at R&D Studios in Albuquerque, at Lydkjøkkenet in Oslo. Production was handled by Happy Perez, Big Ice, Mario Ayala, Mike Cee, Oral Bee and Shadow, with Charles Chavez and Baby Bash serving as executive producer. It features guest appearances from Russell Lee, Grimm, Frankie J, Angel Dust, A-Wax, Chingo Bling, Doom, Happy Perez, Jay Tee, Low G, Lucky Luciano, Major Riley, Max Minelli, Merciless, Oral Bee, Perla Cruz, Powda and David Wade.

The album debuted at number 48 on the Billboard 200 in the United States. It was certified Gold by the Recording Industry Association of America on February 19, 2004, and reached Platinum certification on March 9, 2023. It also peaked at number 22 in New Zealand, number 80 in France and number 92 in Germany.

The album's lead single "Suga Suga" became Baby Bash's highest-charting song on the US Billboard Hot 100, reaching number seven, and it appeared on several international rankings, including the New Zealand Singles Chart, where it peaked at number one. It has received sales certifications in Australia, Germany, New Zealand, and the United States. The second single, "Shorty Doowop" featuring Russell Lee and Tiffany Villarreal, peaked at No. 31 in Germany, No. 36 in Switzerland and No. 57 in Austria.

== Critical reception ==
Professional ratings
Review scores
Source	Rating
AllMusic	4/5 stars
Blender	1/5 stars
Now	2/5
RapReviews	8/10

Steve 'Flash' Juon of RapReviews gave the album high praise for Happy Perez's Hispanic-influenced production and Bash's smooth, laid-back delivery, concluding that "Bash may be a long-time veteran of hip-hop and latin rap, but he represents the newest trends and emerging dopeness of regionally recognized hispanic hip-hop to the best and fullest. Easily one of 2003's "must cop" albums, Tha Smokin' Nephew will open many eyes and please just as many ears". AllMusic's David Jeffries also praised Perez's production for being energetic and cohesive, and Bash's lyrical content for containing different topics, concluding that "At 17 tracks it runs a little long, but there are only a few seeds and sticks to pick out of Baby Bash's fat bag". Nick Flanagan of Now wrote: "Baby Bash raps in a mellow style over smooth, almost easy-listening beats with a smattering of Ginuwine-esque R&B choruses. The song titles are entertaining – Image Of Pimp, Don't Disrespect My Mind – but 17 songs are a lot, especially when half aren't that great, although it gets better as it goes along". Jonah Weiner of Blender panned the album for its lady-focused lyrical content being mediocrely delivered over subpar production. He added that the single "Suga Suga" was the only noteworthy track on the album.

== Track listing ==
No.	Title	Writer(s)	Producer(s)	Length
1.	"Suga Suga" (featuring Frankie J)	Ronald Ray Bryant; Francisco Bautista	Happy Perez	3:59
2.	"Yeh Suh!" (featuring Max Minelli)	Bryant; Chad Roussel	Happy Perez	4:04
3.	"Weed Hand" (featuring Grimm and Lucky Luciano)	Bryant; Paul Ramirez; Christian Garcia	Shadow	4:19
4.	"Shorty Doowop" (featuring Russell Lee and Perla Cruz)	Bryant; Russell Atkins	Happy Perez	3:18
5.	"On tha Curb" (featuring David Wade)	Bryant	Mike Cee	3:53
6.	"Sexy Eyes (Da Da Da Da)" (featuring Russell Lee)	Bryant; Atkins	Happy Perez	4:29
7.	"Image of Pimp" (featuring Oral Bee)	Bryant; Anders Smedstad; Andreas Wille Paulsen; Garcia	Big Ice; Oral Bee	4:01
8.	"Early in the Morning"	Bryant	Mario Ayala	4:46
9.	"Feeling Me" (featuring Russell Lee)	Bryant; Atkins	Happy Perez	3:53
10.	"Oh Wow" (featuring Merciless and Happy Perez)	Bryant; Marco Prada	Happy Perez	3:55
11.	"Changed My Life" (featuring Grimm)	Bryant; Ramirez	Happy Perez	3:51
12.	"Stay Perkin'" (featuring Angel Dust, Chingo Bling and Doom)	Bryant; Angel LaFaele Noe; Pedro Eugene Herrera; Frank Zuniga III	Happy Perez	4:31
13.	"Pollution" (featuring Russell Lee, Grimm and Rasheed)	Bryant; Atkins; Ramirez; Alfonso Cook	Happy Perez	4:48
14.	"Ménage à Trois" (featuring Frankie J and Powda)	Bryant; Bautista; Angela Perez	Happy Perez	4:15
15.	"Tha Chop" (featuring A-Wax and Jay Tee)	Bryant; Aaron Doppie; James Trujillo	Happy Perez	4:07
16.	"Don't Disrespect My Mind" (featuring Low-G)	Bryant; Wilson Flores	Happy Perez	4:11
17.	"Suga Suga" (remix featuring Major Riley)	Bryant; Bautista; Joe Russell May	Happy Perez	4:05
Total length:				70:25

== Charts ==
Chart (2003–04)	Peak position
French Albums (SNEP)	80
German Albums (Offizielle Top 100)	92
New Zealand Albums (RMNZ)	22
US Billboard 200	48
US Top R&B/Hip-Hop Albums (Billboard)	32

== Certifications ==
Region	Certification	Certified units/sales
United States (RIAA)	Platinum	1,000,000^{‡}
^{‡} Sales+streaming figures based on certification alone.
