= Happy Perez =

- Also known as: Happy P
- Born: Nathan Perez
- Genres: Hip hop; R&B
- Occupations: Record producer; audio engineer; songwriter
- Years active: 1995–present
- Label: Universal

Nathan "Happy" Perez is an American record producer, audio engineer, songwriter, and multi-instrumentalist. He was first credited on Young Bleed's debut album All I Have in This World, Are... My Balls and My Word in 1998. He co-wrote and produced his first hit song with Baby Bash's 2003 single "Suga Suga", which peaked at number seven on the US Billboard Hot 100. He has since been credited on releases for Halsey, the Weeknd, Chris Brown, Miley Cyrus, Kehlani, the Kid Laroi, Ludacris, Flo Rida, Mariah Carey, G-Eazy, and Juice Wrld.

Perez has worked extensively with R&B singer Miguel, producing his 2010 sleeper hit "Sure Thing". In 2018, he became acquainted with fellow producer Benny Blanco and co-produced his 2018 single "Eastside", as well as a number of his productions since then. Perez dropped out of high school to make music.

== Discography ==
=== Mixtapes ===
- 2009 – The Self Employed Mixtape, Vol. 1

== Production discography ==
=== Charted singles (as songwriter/producer) ===
Year	Title	Artist	Album	Peak chart positions		
Year	Title	Artist	Album	US	US R&B/HH	UK
2003	Tha Smokin' Nephew Album	Baby Bash	Tha Smokin' Nephew; RIAA: Platinum			
2003	"Suga Suga"	Baby Bash featuring Frankie J	Tha Smokin' Nephew; RIAA: Platinum	7	54	111
2003	"Shorty Doowop"	Baby Bash featuring Russell Lee & Perla Cruz	Tha Smokin' Nephew; RIAA: Platinum	115	108	—
2003	I'm All I Got Album	Max Minelli	I'm All I Got			
2004	"Ain't a Thug"	Trick Daddy	Thug Matrimony: Married to the Streets			
2005	"Show Ya Tattoos"	Boosie Badazz & Webbie	Gangsta Musik			
2005	"Frontin'"	Chamillionaire	The Sound of Revenge; RIAA: Platinum			
2005	"Ridin'" RIAA: Gold	Chamillionaire	The Sound of Revenge; RIAA: Platinum			
2005	Super Saucy Album	Baby Bash	Super Saucy Album			
2005	Natalie Album	Natalie	Natalie Album			
2006	"Doing Too Much"	Paula DeAnda featuring Baby Bash	Paula DeAnda	41	—	—
2006	"Footprints On My Heart"	Paula DeAnda	Paula DeAnda			
2006	Irresistible	Paula DeAnda	Paula DeAnda			
2006	"End Of The Night"	Ludacris	Release Therapy			
2006	"Rather Just Not Know"	Ruben Studdard	The Return			
2006	"Daddy's Little Girl"	Frankie J	Priceless			
2006	"Still"	Frankie J	Priceless			
2006	"Cool on You"	Keshia Chanté	2U			
2006	Un Nuevo Dia Album	Frankie J	Un Nuevo Dia Album			
	Everything New Album	Natalie	Everything New Album			
2007	"Pimp Mode"	Chamillionaire	Ultimate Victory			
2007	"Rocky Road"	Chamillionaire	Ultimate Victory			
2007	"The Ultimate Victory"	Chamillionaire	Ultimate Victory			
2007	"As Days Go By"	Baby Bash	Cyclone			
2007	"Mean Mug"	Baby Bash	Cyclone			
2007	"Head Honcho"	Chingo Bling ft. Baby Bash	They Can't Deport Us All			
2008	"Corazón"	Prima J	Prima J			
2008	"All On Our Own"	One Block Radius	One Block Radius			
2008	"Shoplifta"	One Block Radius	One Block Radius			
2009	"Never"	Flo Rida	R.O.O.T.S			
2010	"Sure Thing" RIAA: 3× Platinum	Miguel	All I Want Is You; RIAA: Platinum			
2010	"My Piece"	Miguel	All I Want Is You; RIAA: Platinum			
2011	"Don't Mess With Texas"	Baby Bash	Bashtown			
2012	"Hello World"	Diggy	Unexpected Arrival			
2012	"Don't Look Back"	Miguel	Kaleidoscope Dream; RIAA: Platinum			
2013	"Pay My Bills"	K. Michelle	Rebellious Soul			
2013	"Pink Fields"	Neon Hitch	Happy Neon			
2013	"Midnight Sun"	Neon Hitch	Happy Neon			
2013	"Believe"	Neon Hitch	Happy Neon			
2013	"Jailhouse"	Neon Hitch	Happy Neon			
2013	"Born to be Remembered"	Neon Hitch	Happy Neon			
2014	"#Beautiful"	Mariah Carey featuring Miguel	Me. I Am Mariah... The Elusive Chanteuse	15	3	22
2014	"Love Somebody"	Daley	Days + Nights			
2014	"Love You To Death"	Taeyang	RISE			
	"Light Up Light Up"	Baby Bash	Ronnie Rey All Day			
2015	"Drifting"	G-Eazy featuring Chris Brown & Tory Lanez	When It's Dark Out	98	33	—
2015	"Drop Dead Beautiful"	Elijah Blake	Shadows & Diamonds			
2015	"Angel Dust"	Elijah Blake	Shadows & Diamonds			
2015	"a beautiful exit"	Miguel	Wildheart			
2016	"Sugar"	Robin Schulz featuring Francesco Yates	Sugar	44	—	—
2016	"Waves" RIAA: Gold	Miguel	Wildheart	—	46	—
2016	"To D.R.E.A.M."	Tory Lanez	I Told You; RIAA: Gold			
2016	"Cold Hard Love"	Tory Lanez	I Told You; RIAA: Gold			
2016	"High"	Tory Lanez	I Told You; RIAA: Gold			
2016	"All The Girls"	Tory Lanez	I Told You; RIAA: Gold			
2016	"Workaholic"	DRAM	Big Baby DRAM			
2017	"At My Best"	Machine Gun Kelly featuring Hailee Steinfeld	Bloom	60	—	—
2017	"Now or Never" RIAA: 3× Platinum	Halsey	Hopeless Fountain Kingdom; RIAA: 2× Platinum	17	—	80
2017	"Eyes Closed" RIAA: Gold	Halsey	Hopeless Fountain Kingdom; RIAA: 2× Platinum	101	—	—
2017	"Crying in the Club" RIAA: Platinum	Camila Cabello	Camila	47	—	12
2017	"Holy Water"	Ro James	ELDORADO			
2017	"Torches"	X Ambassadors	Non-album single			
2017	"Selfish Love"	Jessie Ware	Glasshouse			
2017	"Sky Walker" RIAA: 3× Platinum	Miguel	War & Leisure; RIAA: Gold	29	14	—
2017	"Now"	Miguel	War & Leisure; RIAA: Gold			
2017	"Told You So"	Miguel	War & Leisure; RIAA: Gold			
2017	"Harem"	Miguel	War & Leisure; RIAA: Gold			
2017	"City of Angels"	Miguel	War & Leisure; RIAA: Gold			
2018	"Black & White"	Juice WRLD	Goodbye & Good Riddance	123	108	—
2018	"Hard Work Pays Off"	Future & Juice WRLD	Wrld on Drugs	105	103	—
2018	"4 Me"	Tory Lanez	Memories Don't Die			
2018	"Hypnotized"	Tory Lanez	Memories Don't Die			
2018	"Better To Lie"	Benny Blanco	Friends Keep Secrets; RIAA: Platinum			
2018	"Eastside" RIAA: 6× Platinum	Benny Blanco	Friends Keep Secrets; RIAA: Platinum	9	—	1
2018	"Break My Heart"	Benny Blanco	Friends Keep Secrets; RIAA: Platinum			
2018	"Just for us Pt.2"	Benny Blanco	Friends Keep Secrets; RIAA: Platinum			
2018	"More/ Diamond Ring"	Benny Blanco	Friends Keep Secrets; RIAA: Platinum			
2018	"Roses" RIAA: 2× Platinum	Benny Blanco	Friends Keep Secrets; RIAA: Platinum			
2019	"Fake Smile"	Ariana Grande	Thank U, Next; RIAA: Platinum	26	—	—
2019	"Imagine"	Ariana Grande	Thank U, Next; RIAA: Platinum			
2019	"In My Head"	Ariana Grande	Thank U, Next; RIAA: Platinum			
2019	"Nightmare"	Halsey	Non-album single	15	—	26
2019	"It's You"	Ali Gatie	You	70	—	—
2019	"Graduation" RIAA: Platinum	Benny Blanco featuring Juice WRLD	Non-album single	108	—	88
2019	"Die for Me" RIAA: Platinum	Post Malone featuring Future & Halsey	Hollywood's Bleeding	20	11	—
2019	"Back To Love"	Chris Brown	Indigo			
2019	"Chase"	Aaron Carpenter	Chase			
2019	"White Mercedes"	Charli XCX	Charli			
2019	"Same As"	Marc E. Bassy	PMD			
2019	"I Really Wish I Hated You"	Blink-182	NINE			
2019	"Love You Like That"	Ali Gatie	YOU			
2019	"How Things Used to Be"	Ali Gatie	YOU			
2019	"Bussin"	Tay Money	Hurricane Tay			
2019	"Die For You"	Post Malone featuring Halsey & Future	Hollywood's Bleeding			
2020	"Night Crawling"	Miley Cyrus	Plastic Hearts; RIAA: Gold			
2020	"Erase U"	The Kid Laroi	F*CK LOVE 3+: OVER YOU; RIAA: Platinum			
2020	"Over It"	KYLE	See You When I am Famous!!!!			
2020	"Casino"	Ryan Beatty	Dreaming of David			
2020	"Shimmer"	Ryan Beatty	Dreaming of David			
2020	"Dreaming of David"	Ryan Beatty	Dreaming of David			
2020	"Forever...(is a long time)"	Halsey	Manic; RIAA: Platinum			
2020	"I Hate Everybody"	Halsey	Manic; RIAA: Platinum			
2020	"Killing Boys"	Halsey	Manic; RIAA: Platinum			
2020	"No Shame"	5 Seconds of Summer	CALM	112		
2020	"Best Years"	5 Seconds of Summer	CALM			
2020	"Lover of Mine"	5 Seconds of Summer	CALM			
2020	"Thin White Lies"	5 Seconds of Summer	CALM			
2020	"Bussin 2.0"	Tay Money featuring Saweetie	Non-album single			
2021	"Kiss Like The Sun"	Jake Bugg	Saturday Night, Sunday Morning			
2021	"About Last Night"	Jake Bugg	Saturday Night, Sunday Morning			
2021	"Notice Me"	Role Model	oh, how perfect			
2021	"Cowboys"	Charlotte Lawrence	Charlotte			
2021	"Monin"	James Fauntleroy	Non-album single			
2021	"Scars"	G-Eazy	These Things Happen Too			
2021	"Scenic Drive"	Khalid	Scenic Drive			
2021	"Rich & Famous "	DRAM	Shelley FKA DRAM			
2022	"Tangerine"	Kehlani	Blue Water Road			
2022	"Everything"	Kehlani	Blue Water Road			
2022	"Melt"	Kehlani	Blue Water Road			
2022	"Everything Interlude	Kehlani	Blue Water Road			
2023	"Die 4 Me"	Halsey	Non-album Single	100		
2023	"Lipstick"	Charlie Puth	Non-album Single			
2023	"Lace It"	Juice WRLD & Eminem	Non-album Single			
2024	"Quemar"	Ethan Uno				
2024	"Take Me In"	Blink 182				
2025	"Hit You Were It Hurts"	Coco Jones	Why Not More?			
2025	"Overwhelmed"	Alicia Creti				
2025	"Buttercup"	Lunchmoney				
2026	"Dancing in the sand"	Pilar Victoria				
2026	"Bloomed In Snow"	Pilar Victoria				
2026	"Why?"	Jacks Haupt				
2026	"Luna Llena"	Jacks Haupt				
2026	"Here, Now & Forever	Jacks Haupt				
