= Happy Neon =

EP by Neon Hitch
- Released: 14 January 2013
- Recorded: 2012
- Genre: Dream pop; psychedelic pop
- Length: 21:19
- Label: Warner Music Group; eleutheromusic
- Producer: Neon Hitch; Happy Perez

Neon Hitch chronology
Happy Neon (2013)	301 to Paradise (2014)

Happy Neon is an EP by British singer–songwriter Neon Hitch. It was released on 14 January 2013 through Warner Music Group, and later through Hitch's independent label, eleuthromusic, after her split from Warner.

== Background ==
In an interview with Billboard's Jason Lipshutz, Hitch stated on the making of the EP, "We locked ourselves in the studio for a week and just made music constantly. It turned out to be this whole EP, and there's no way we couldn't call it Happy Neon".

== Critical reception ==
Jason Lipshutz of Billboard claimed: "[Happy Neon] combines sleek, arena–ready pop production with intimate lyrics that capture the 26–year–old at a pivotal moment in her young career. 'Pink Fields', for instance, concludes a wrenching vocal performance with an infectious refrain, while 'Jailhouse' finds Hitch pleading to 'Please set me free!' as stuttering percussion creates the walls of her conceptual prison."

== Songs ==
A music video for "Pink Fields" was released on 6 March 2013, and a music video for "Midnight Sun" was released on 30 April 2013.

== Track listing ==
Standard edition
No.	Title	Writer(s)	Length
1.	"The Bus"	Neon Hitch; Nathan Perez	0:34
2.	"Pink Fields"		4:11
3.	"Midnight Sun"		4:04
4.	"Believe" (^{[a]})		4:18
5.	"Jailhouse"		3:34
6.	"Born to Be Remembered"		5:18
Total length:			21:19

Notes

- ^{[a]} signifies that "Believe" was originally titled "The Wizard Believe".
