= Chingo Bling =

American rapper, record producer and comedian (born 1979)

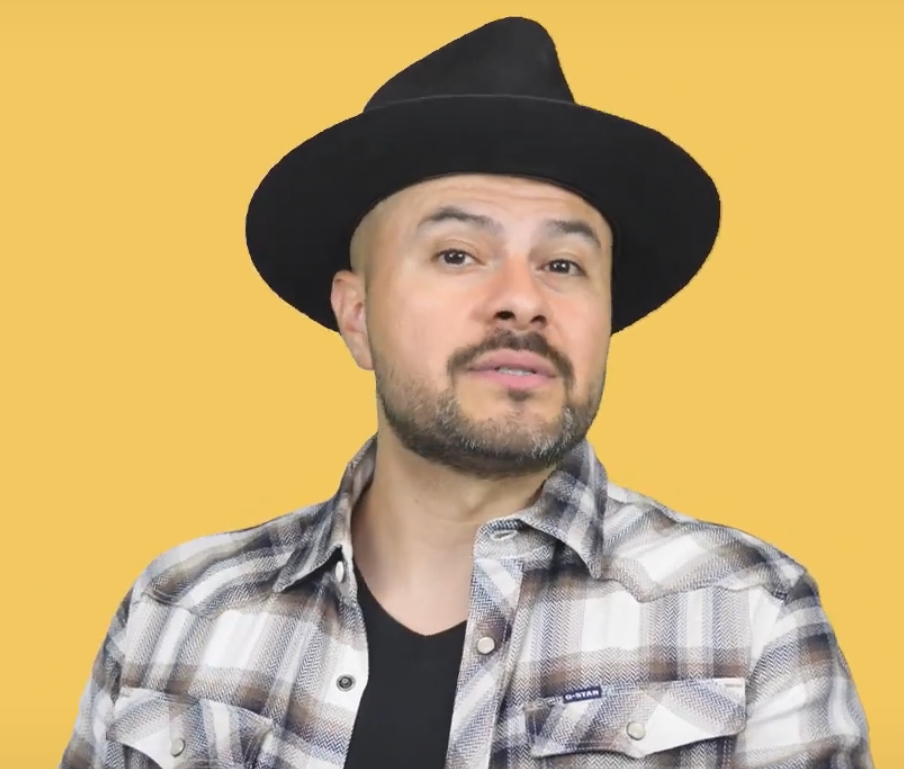
- Chingo Bling in 2021

Background information
- Born: Pedro Herrera III; August 23, 1979 (age 46); Houston, Texas, US
- Genres: Hip hop • Southern hip hop • Chicano rap • gangsta rap
- Occupation: Rapper • record producer • comedian
- Years active: 2000–present
- Labels: Big Chile Enterprises, Asylum Records
- Spouse: Marisol Martinez
- Website: www.chingobling.com

Pedro Herrera III (born August 23, 1979), known professionally as Chingo Bling, is an American rapper, producer and comedian.

== Early life and education ==
Chingo attended Peddie School, a private college preparatory boarding school in Hightstown, New Jersey, on a scholarship. Chingo graduated from Trinity University in San Antonio, Texas, with a bachelor's degree in Marketing in 2001. He now lives in Houston.

== Career ==
=== Rapping career ===
Chingo first gained exposure through his first mixtape release Duro en la pintura and other mixtapes such as The Air Chingo Mixtape and El Mero Chingon, in 2004 through his Independent Record label, Big Chile Enterprises he released his first album The Tamale Kingpin Featuring hit records like Walk like Cleto and American Pie featuring Mike Jones and Paul Wall followed this up by releasing His second album Running 4 President in 2005, his Unique style of music and Great self promotion had major labels wanting to sign him, and in 2006 he signed a Distribution deal with Asylum Records, that same year he released a double disc album named They all want him but who can afford him? which featured artists such as Lucky Luciano, South Park Mexican, Trae tha Truth and N.O.R.E..

On August 14, 2007, Chingo released the album They Can't Deport Us All through Asylum Records, the album featured artists such as Paul Wall, Lucky Luciano, Stunta, 5th Ward Webbie, Fat Pat, Big Pokey, Baby Bash, Coast and Pitbull.

=== Comedy career ===
He launched a YouTube page and utilized social media as an outlet for his humor.

Chingo Bling's first comedy special, "They Cant Deport Us All" was co-produced with the MiTu network and is now streaming on the Netflix platform.

=== Controversy ===
Chingo Bling had been criticized for the title of his second album They Can't Deport Us All. He was interviewed on CW39 News and said his family's tamale truck has been shot at, vandalized and even, on one occasion, stolen. He also stated he had received racist death threats from White nationalist groups, but still does not intend to change his album's title. Music critics often associated his music with violent street gangs. Chingo also alleges that he was refused the opportunity to appear at a scheduled in-store album signing at a Dallas shopping mall as a direct result of the controversy surrounding his clothing and album name. He also asserts that he is the target of numerous Conservative journalists and right wing bloggers who criticize him because of his music and marketing concepts related to immigration.

Prior to the 2020 presidential election, Chingo Bling came out in support of Donald Trump's re-election, arguing that tighter immigration restrictions would benefit citizens in different ways, including more access to healthcare and jobs.

== Discography ==
=== Albums ===
- Duro en la Pintura - Hard in the Paint (2002)
- "The Air Chingo Mixtape" (2004)
- "El Mero Chingon" (2004)
- "The Tamale Kingpin" (2004)
- "Chingo Bling 4 President" (2005)
- For President (Skrewed N' Chopped) (2005)
- Undaground's Most Wanted (2006)
- They All Want Him But Who Can Afford Him (2006)
- They Can't Deport Us All (2007)
- "Superthrowd" (2008)
- "Me Vale Madre" (2009)
- "World Star Wetbacks" (2009)
- Tamale Season 2 (2010)
- El Chavo del H (2010)
- The Leak (2011)
- Back To The Border (2011)
- Chingaveli (2011)
- Masahouse (2011)
- "Chicken Flippa" (2012)
- "Cancun Shawty" (2013)
- "Vote 4 pedro" (2014)
- "Masahouse 2" (2015)
- "Juan Hunna" (2015)
- "Dirty Horchata" (2016)
- "El Versace Mariachi" (2020)
