= Natalie (singer) =

American singer

- Born: Natalie Nicole Alvarado
- Origin: Clear Lake City, Texas, U.S.
- Genres: R&B, hip hop
- Occupations: Singer, songwriter, dancer
- Years active: 2001–2012; 2020–present
- Label: The Universal Motown/Universal Republic Group

Natalie Nicole Alvarado, better known simply as Natalie, is an American R&B singer and songwriter. She is currently the entertainment director for the Houston Rockets.

== Biography ==
After her high school years, she chose to study criminal justice. She was previously a cheerleader for the Houston Rockets NBA team and backup dancer for various R&B and rap artists from Houston, Texas. During her stint as a cheerleader, she was also working on her lyrical skills and even added rapping to her dance performances. Charles Chavez, founder of Latium Entertainment and producer of such artists as Baby Bash, Frankie J, and Chamillionaire, believed that she would have potential as a successful musical artist and introduced her to producers Happy Perez and Play N Skillz. Under Latium, she was initially signed as a rapper but later focused on singing, which she had frequently done for hooks on songs.

Natalie made her debut as a singer with her hit 2005 single "Goin' Crazy"; the song reached #13 on the U.S. Billboard Hot 100 singles chart. Her self-titled debut album Natalie was released in May 2005 and reached #16 on the U.S. Billboard 200 albums chart. Her second single from the album, "Energy" (featuring Baby Bash), peaked at #66. The third & final single "Where Are You" (featuring Justin Roman) failed to chart. A fourth track, "Emptiness" managed to chart on Billboard's R&B Singles chart, although it was not released as a single. She also was the opening act of the 2005 Wango Tango music festival in Anaheim, California hosted by Los Angeles, California radio station KIIS and the sold-out 2005 Latium Tour of Baby Bash and Frankie J. Zalia Cosmetics also recruited her as a model. She has also collaborated with Baby Bash on the songs "Bubbalicious" and "Throwed Off" from his 2005 album Super Saucy. She also has appeared on Chamillionaire's The Sound of Revenge in the song "Think I'm Crazy". She also has appeared on Poetic Thug's Da One & Only in the song "My Destiny" and Latino Heat in the song "Down South Playaz".

Natalie's second album, Everything New, was released in 2006. She stated that the album aims toward a more "dance-pop" direction in musicality. She also signed a deal to become a songwriter for EMI.

She retired from singing in 2012 to become a coach, choreographer, and manager of Houston Rockets Entertainment, including the Houston Rockets Clutch City Dancers.

Currently touring again. Last played Cake in Albuquerque, NM on January 27, 2023

== Television ==
- Live with Regis & Kelly (2005) Herself - Musical Guest.
- Mun2-Vivo (2006) Herself - Guest/Musical Guest.

== Discography ==
=== Albums ===
List of albums, with selected details and chart positions
Title	Details	Peak chart positions
Title	Details	US
Natalie	Released: May 17, 2005 (US); Label: Universal	16
Everything New	Released: September 16, 2006 (US); Label: Universal Republic	—
Winter	Released: January 8, 2021 (US); Label: MainTen Entertainment	—
Purple Winter	Released: January 25, 2022 (US); Label: MainTen Entertainment	—

=== Singles ===
List of singles, with selected chart positions
Title	Year	Peak chart positions		Album
Title	Year	US	AUS	Album
"Come On and Shake Your Body" (Dada featuring Natalie)	2004	—	—	Non-album single
"Goin' Crazy"	2005	13	75	Natalie
"Energy" (featuring Baby Bash)	2005	66	—	Natalie
"Where Are You" (featuring Justin Roman)	2005	—	—	Natalie
"What You Gonna Do" (featuring Bun B)	2006	—	—	Everything New
"Love You So"	2006	—	—	Everything New
"Call Me Up"	2006	—	—	Everything New

=== Other appearances ===
- "Bubbalicious" (Baby Bash featuring Natalie)
- "Throwed Off" (Baby Bash featuring Paul Wall and Natalie)
- "Think I'm Crazy" (Chamillionaire featuring Natalie)
- "Last Chance" (Miss Lady Pinks featuring Natalie)
- "Destiny" (Poetic Thug featuring Natalie)
- "Down South Playaz" (Poetic Thug featuring Natalie, Lil Buda & Gifted)
