= Baby Bash =

American rapper

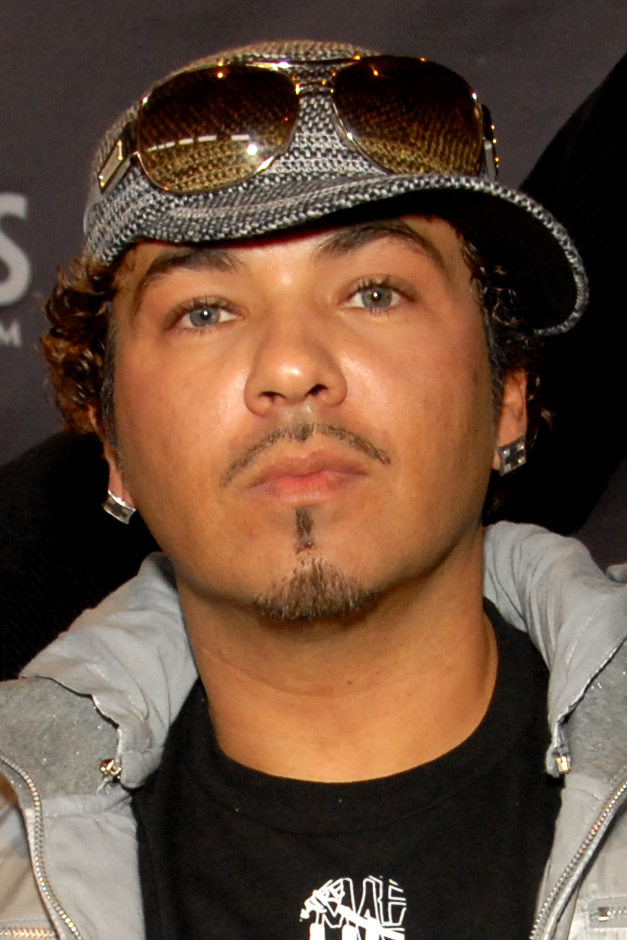
- Baby Bash in 2010

Background information
- Also known as: Baby Beesh
- Born: Ronald Ray Bryant; October 18, 1975 (age 51); Vallejo, California, U.S.
- Origin: Houston, Texas, U.S.
- Genres: Pop rap, Latin hip-hop
- Occupations: Rapper; singer; songwriter
- Works: Baby Bash discography
- Years active: 1996–present
- Labels: Diamond Lane; Bashtown; EMPIRE; Upstairs; Arista; Universal; Dope House

Ronald Ray Bryant, better known by his stage name Baby Bash (formerly Baby Beesh), is an American rapper. His first two albums, Savage Dreams (2001) and On Tha Cool (2002), were released by the independent Houston-based label Dope House Records under his former stage name "Baby Beesh". It was changed to "Baby Bash" before he signed with Universal Records in 2003 and released his pop rap single, "Suga Suga" (featuring Frankie J), in July of that year. The song became his first hit, peaking at number seven on the Billboard Hot 100 and serving as lead single for his third album and major label debut, Tha Smokin' Nephew (2003).

In 2005, he guest appeared on Frankie J's single "Obsession (No Es Amor)," which peaked at number three on the Billboard Hot 100 and remains his highest-charting song. His fourth album, Super Saucy (2005), peaked at number 11 on the Billboard 200 and was led by the top 20 single, "Baby, I'm Back" (featuring Akon). After transferring to Arista Records, he released his 2007 single, "Cyclone" (featuring T-Pain), which matched "Suga Suga" on the Billboard Hot 100 and preceded his fifth album of the same name (2007). His fourth album, Bashtown (2011), was released independently.

He has collaborated with a number of artists throughout his career, such as West Coast rappers B-Legit, Nate Dogg, Coolio, E-40 and Mac Dre; R&B singers such as Avant, Keith Sweat, Bohemia, and Mario; and other Latino artists such as Fat Joe, South Park Mexican, Natalie, Frost, and Pitbull. Alongside his solo career, he has released nine collaborative albums; four with fellow California rapper Jay Tee as "Latino Velvet," and respective projects with Paul Wall and Frankie J.

== Biography ==
=== Early life ===
Bryant was born in Vallejo, California, to a father of English descent and a mother of Mexican descent. Bryant was raised by his grandmother after his parents went to jail. Bryant's father and uncles exposed him to many different types of musical genres. Initially, Bryant wanted to be a professional basketball player. He played basketball at Solano Community College. An ankle injury prevented Bryant from pursuing basketball as a career and he starting making music in his friend's recording studio.

=== 1990s–2002: Savage Dreams and On tha Cool ===
Bryant's music career began as part of the group Potna Duece in Vallejo, California. He went to Houston in 1998, where he met fellow rapper South Park Mexican. Prior to his success as a solo artist he, under the name "Baby Beesh", was part of rap groups Potna Deuce and Latino Velvet.

Bash's debut album, Savage Dreams, was released on the independent label Dope House Records in 2001. The album features guest performances by South Park Mexican, Frost, Jay Tee, Mr. Kee, Don Cisco and Merciless.

On tha Cool is his second studio album, released June 11, 2002, on Dope House Records. It was produced by Happy P and Johnny Z. The album features guest performances by SPM, Jay Tee, Russell Lee, Don Cisco, Mr. Shadow and DJ Kane.

=== 2003–2005: Tha Smokin' Nephew, Ménage à Trois and Super Saucy ===
The acclaim he received caught the attention of Universal Records, who signed him later that year. In 2003, Baby Bash released his first album on a major label, Tha Smokin' Nephew. It debuted at number 48 on the Billboard 200. Five months after its release, the album was certified Gold by the RIAA. As of March 2005, the album has sold 531,000 copies in the United States. Ménage à Trois is an independent label album (fifth album overall) by Baby Bash.

In 2005, Bash released Super Saucy. Super Saucy is the first official studio album (sixth album overall) by Baby Bash released in March 2005. It spawned the hit single, "Baby I'm Back" (featuring Akon) which reached number 19 on the Billboard Hot 100. It is also his last release on Universal Records before signing with Arista Records. The album debuted at number 11 on the Billboard 200 with 48,000 copies sold in the first week released, becoming Baby Bash's highest-charting album to date.

=== 2006–2011: Cyclone and Bashtown ===
He was featured on Paula DeAnda's first single "Doin' Too Much", from her debut album Paula DeAnda. His third studio album, Cyclone (initially titled Ronnie Rey All Day), was released in late October 2007. So far, Bryant has released three singles from the album: "Mamacita", featuring Marcos Hernandez, "Na Na", and "Cyclone", featuring Mickaël & T-Pain. During the month of the album's release, Baby Bash became Myspace's No. 1 Latin artist, and the single "Cyclone" sold over 750,000 digital copies and ringtones prior to the album's release.

Bryant completed a film entitled Primos, starring Chingo Bling and Danny Trejo. The comedy involves three cousins working in a bakery with dreams of making money and was released in 2010. His major-label debut, Tha Smokin' Nephew, was well received by AllMusic, but his 2007 album, Cyclone, was given mixed reviews, including a negative review by Rolling Stone magazine.

Bashtown is the fourth studio album by Bryant. Released on March 22, 2011, it is the first album to be released on Upstairs Records. Bashtown features production from Jim Jonsin, Printz Board, Happy P, Mickaël, J. Lacy, and C-Ballin, and features vocal guests E-40, Paul Wall, Slim Thug, and Lloyd, among others. According to Bryant, the album was recorded in 2010.

In December 2010, Bryant was offered a job as an on-air personality for Wild 94.9, a Rhythmic Contemporary commercial radio station in San Francisco, California. In the same month, Bryant announced that he would be endorsing a new energy drink for women named after his 2011 single "Go Girl". Part of the sales proceeds from the energy drink will be donated to various charities for breast cancer- and ovarian cancer-research for women.

=== 2011–present: Unsung ===
Bryant was arrested with Paul Wall on the night of September 10, 2011, in El Paso, Texas, for possession of marijuana. Both rappers were released the same night on US$300 bail.

Bryant has three kids: two boys, a girl, and a stepdaughter and has a longtime girlfriend Jennifer.

On December 17, 2013, Bryant released his eighth studio album, Unsung. The album features artists such as Too Short, Miguel, and Problem. Production credits of the album belong to DJ Rex, Happy Perez, Mickaël, J. Lacy, and C-Ballin.

== Awards and nominations ==
Award	Year	Nominee(s)	Category	Result	Ref.
Teen Choice Awards	2005	"Obsession (No Es Amor)" (with Frankie J)	Choice Music: Make-Out Song	Nominated	

== Discography ==
=== Studio albums ===
- Savage Dreams (2001)
- On Tha Cool (2002)
- Tha Smokin' Nephew (2003)
- Super Saucy (2005)
- Cyclone (2007)
- Bashtown (2011)
- Unsung (2013)
- Ronnie Rey All Day (2014)
- Don't Panic, It's Organic (2016)

=== Collaboration albums ===
- Welcome to Da Tilt with Potna Deuce (1994)
- Latino Velvet Project with Latino Velvet (1997)
- Velvet City with Latino Velvet (2000)
- Wanted with Lone Star Ridaz (2001)
- Velvetism with Jay Tee (2002)
- M.S.U. with Jay Tee (2012)
- Playamade Mexicanz with Lucky Luciano (2012)
- The Legalizers: Legalize or Die, Vol. 1 with Paul Wall (2016)
- Sangria with Frankie J (2017)

== Films ==
- Pain (2010)
- Filly Brown (2013)
- Vengeance (2014)
