= Lucky Luciano (rapper) =

American rapper (born 1981)

- Born: Christian Anthony Garcia; April 20, 1981 (age 45)
- Origin: Houston, Texas, U.S.
- Genres: Southern rap; hip hop
- Occupation: Rapper
- Years active: 1996–present
- Labels: Dope House; Latium; Unseen; Steak N Shrimp; Playa Mexikanz; Diamond Lane
- Website: lucianotv.com

Christian Anthony Garcia (born April 20, 1981), better known by his stage name Lucky Luciano, is an American rapper from Houston, Texas. After leaving Latium Records and Dope House Records, he is the current CEO of his label Steak N Shrimp Records, Playa Mexican Music Group, Bash Town Records, Diamond Lane Music Group.

== Biography ==
Garcia is Mexican-American, He was featured early on tracks by Baby Bash and South Park Mexican, which led to Lucky's appearance on SPM's The Purity Album.

Lucky Luciano received "Album of the Year" for his album Pimps Up Hoez Down at the 2006 Texas Latin Rap Awards. Lucky Luciano was named "Artist of the Year" at the 2009 Texas Latin Rap Awards. In 2009, Lucky also organized and produced "The Houston Latin Mic Pass" featuring many underground Houston artists.

== Discography ==
=== Studio albums ===
- 2001: Lucky Me
- 2003: You Already Know
- 2005: Johnny Paycheck Vol. 1
- 2005: The 4th Wish: To Sprinkle The World (Unreleased by Dope House Records)
- 2005: Pimps Up, Hoez Down
- 2007: Throwdest Playas Down Souf
- 2008: Ahead of My Time
- 2009: A New Movement
- 2009: Purple Tagz 2K9
- 2009: World Star Wetbacks
- 2011: Money Bags
- 2011: Addicted to Ballin'
- 2017: 2017 Reasons

=== Collaboration albums ===
- 2009: World Star Wetbacks (with Chingo Bling)
- 2012: Family Business (with Low-G and Rasheed)
- 2012: Playamade Mexicanz (with Baby Bash)
- 2016: Latin Royalty (with GT Garza)
- 2017: Playamade Mexicanz 2 (with Baby Bash)

=== Remix albums ===
- 2003: You Already Know: Drapped & Dripped
- 2005: Johnny Paycheck Vol. 1: Screwed
- 2005: Playaz Paradise: All Flows
- 2005: Pimps Up, Hoez Down: Screwed & Chopped
- 2005: Throwdest Playas Down Souf: Screwed & Chopped
- 2006: NAWF: Screwed & Chopped
- 2006: Lavish Habits The Mixtape: Screwed & Chopped
- 2013: Greatest Hits: Screwed & Chopped

=== Extended plays ===
- 2013: I Did It (with LE$)
- 2013: Dranked Out On the Mic
- 2013: Gangsta's Paradise: Mai Tai Musik (with Blanco)
- 2014: Luciano (with GT Garza)
- 2015: A Deep Breath
- 2021: Panic Attack

=== Mixtapes ===
- 2003: H-Town Holdin'
- 2004: All Dues Paid
- 2005: Playas Paradise
- 2006: Lost Flows
- 2006: Lavish Habits The Mixtape
- 2006: NAWF (with Stunta)
- 2006: Playas Paradise 2
- 2007: Back From Tour
- 2007: NAWF II (with Stunta & Coast)
- 2007: SNS2K7
- 2007: Playa of the Year
- 2007: Trick or Treat You Beezys!!!
- 2008: H-Town Still Holdin'
- 2008: Playas Paradise 3: Return of the Mack
- 2008: G Status 4 Po'd Up & Pimped Out Edition (Hosted by Lucky Luciano)
- 2008: Screwstone Vol. 1: Planet of the Drank
- 2008: Fuckin 'Em Up Vol. 6: Runnin' for Office
- 2008: Fuckin 'Em Up Vol. 7
- 2009: Nawfiana Jones
- 2009: Kings of Spring Break 4 (with Chingo Bling)
- 2009: Thoed Essays (with Dat Boi T)
- 2010: Recovery
- 2010: Bring It Back Vol. 4 (Hosted by Lucky Luciano)
- 2010: Lucky Vuitton The Flyest Meskin Alive
- 2010: Thoed Essays 2 (with Dat Boi T)
- 2010: Still Pimpin' (with Smuc)
- 2011: iBet This Bitch Jam
- 2011: Back From Vacation
- 2012: FAM: Fly Azz Meskins (with 2Throw'd)
- 2012: Down In Texas (with Lil Ro)
- 2012: Strapped Up N' Iced Out
- 2012: YouAintBoutThatLife
- 2013: Thoed Essays 3 (with Dat Boi T)
- 2013: Nawf by Nawfwest
- 2013: Lucky Lucci da Grand Wizad
- 2013: SNS2K14
- 2014: Get Money Grind Hard or Starve (with Billy Dha Kidd)
- 2014: Mob Musik (with Goldtoes)
- 2014: Da God
- 2014: We Just Ballin' (with Drewskee)
- 2014: NAWF III (with Stunta & Coast)
- 2014: Breakin' Boys Off (with DJ Michael 5000 Watts)
- 2015: Featuring Lucky
- 2015: Legendary
- 2015: Nawfs Most Wanted (with Revenue)
- 2015: The Gate Keepa
- 2015: Nawfs Most Wanted 2 (with Revenue)
- 2016: Cookin' (with Rollie)
