= List of Chicano rappers =

The following is a list of notable Chicano rappers, both individuals and groups. "Chicano rap" is defined as a "subgenre of hip hop that embodies aspects of the Mexican American or Chicano culture."

- 2Mex
- A.L.T.
- Akwid
- B-Real (Cypress Hill)
- Baby Bash
- Berner
- Brownside
- Chingo Bling
- Conejo
- Darkroom Familia
- Delinquent Habits
- Down AKA Kilo
- Flakiss
- Frost (Kid Frost)
- Funky Aztecs
- Jay Tee
- Johnny "J"
- Jonny Z
- Juan Gotti
- Kinto Sol
- Knightowl
- A Lighter Shade of Brown
- Lil Rob
- Lucky Luciano
- MC Magic
- Mellow Man Ace
- Mr. Capone-E
- Mr. Knightowl
- N2Deep
- NB Ridaz
- Proper Dos
- Psycho Realm
- Slow Pain
- Snow Tha Product
- South Park Mexican
- Tha Mexakinz
- That Mexican OT

== See also ==
- Thump Records
- Dope House Records
