= Greatest Hits (A Lighter Shade of Brown album) =

Greatest hits album by A Lighter Shade of Brown
- Released: October 19, 1999
- Recorded: 1991–1999
- Genre: Hip hop
- Length: 46:24
- Label: Thump Records
- Producer: DJ Rectangle, Pebo Rodriguez

A Lighter Shade of Brown chronology
If You Could See Inside Me (1999)	Greatest Hits (1999)

Professional ratings
Review scores
Source	Rating
AllMusic	4/5 stars

Greatest Hits is a compilation album, the sixth and thus far final album released by A Lighter Shade of Brown. It was released on October 19, 1999 for Thump Records and was produced and arranged by DJ Rectangle, Pebo Rodriguez and Bill Walker.

== Track listing ==
1. "On a Sunday Afternoon" – 3:47
2. "Latin Active" – 3:29
3. "If You Wanna Groove" feat. NOVELIST – 3:43
4. "Homies" – 3:31
5. "Hey DJ" – 3:59
6. "Dip into My Ride" – 4:37
7. "Brownies" – 3:36
8. "Brown & Proud" – 3:45
9. "Spill the Wine" – 3:46
10. "Whatever You Want" – 3:58
11. "T.J. Nights" – 3:28
12. "Street Life" (DJ Rectangle Remix) – 4:45
