= The Last Chair Violinist =

Studio album by SPM
- Released: November 18, 2008
- Recorded: 2007–2008
- Genres: Chicano rap; gangsta rap
- Length: 2:00:51
- Label: Dope House Records
- Producer: Jaime "Pain" Ortiz

SPM chronology
When Devils Strike (2006)	The Last Chair Violinist (2008)	The Son of Norma (2014)

The Last Chair Violinist is the tenth solo studio album by American rapper SPM, and his third since the start of his 45-year incarceration in 2002. It features guest appearances by Juan Gotti, Baby Bash, Lucky Luciano, Carolyn Rodriguez and others. The CD consists of 17 songs, including the hit single "Mexican Heaven", and also contains a bonus disc of Coy's songs that have been on previous albums. The Last Chair Violinist was released on November 18, 2008 via Dope House Records.

The album peaked at number 59 on the US Billboard 200 chart.

== Track listing ==
No.	Title	Length
1.	"A Baby's Prayer"	0:57
2.	"Swim"	3:40
3.	"Mexican Heaven" (featuring Carolyn Rodriguez)	4:16
4.	"The Last Chair Violinist" (featuring Carolyn Rodriguez)	3:57
5.	"Gangsterous" (featuring Powda)	4:22
6.	"The Ghost" (featuring Juan Gotti, Nelly & Rasheed)	4:31
7.	"Dead Pictures" (featuring Carolyn Rodriguez & Jak da Rippa)	4:25
8.	"Carolyn Clownin'" (skit)	1:01
9.	"Hoggin' & Doggin'" (featuring Baby Bash, Carolyn Rodriguez, Low-G & Lucky Luciano)	4:47
10.	"These Streets" (featuring Carolyn Rodriguez & Rasheed)	3:44
11.	"In Hillwood" (featuring Baby Bash, Carolyn Rodriguez & Ice)	4:13
12.	"Vogues"	3:51
13.	"Are We Real?" (featuring Carolyn Rodriguez)	4:10
14.	"The Dope House Mind" (featuring Carolyn Rodriguez)	3:54
15.	"Jackers In My Home"	4:24
16.	"Strapped & Deadly" (featuring Carolyn Rodriguez, Coast, Quota Key & Shadow Ramirez)	4:23
17.	"Silhouettes" (featuring Carolyn Rodriguez)	4:53

== Bonus disc ==
No.	Title	Originally Appeared On	Length
1.	"Juan Gotti's Chic" (skit)	Reveille Park	0:32
2.	"I Must Be High" (featuring Russell Lee)	Never Change	4:44
3.	"Bloody War"	Never Change	4:37
4.	"Block of Rock" (featuring Eddie G, Jose "Blocc" DeLeon & Low-G)	Hustle Town	5:42
5.	"The Beach House"	Reveille Park	5:03
6.	"Wizard of Oz" (featuring Sonja Otero)	Hustle Town	5:16
7.	"Filthy Rich"	Never Change	4:42
8.	"The System"	Never Change	4:50
9.	"High Everyday" (Screwed) (featuring Ayana M)	Never Change	4:50
10.	"Iatola"	Reveille Park	4:13
11.	"Dope Game"	The Purity Album	4:35
12.	"Woodson and Worthing" (featuring Low-G)	Reveille Park	6:37

== Chart history ==
Chart (2008)	Peak position
US Billboard 200	59
US Top R&B/Hip-Hop Albums (Billboard)	14
US Top Rap Albums (Billboard)	3
US Independent Albums (Billboard)	3
