= Mi Vida Loca (soundtrack) =

Mi Vida Loca (Original Motion Picture Soundtrack)

Soundtrack album by Various artists
- Released: March 8, 1994
- Recorded: 1993–1994
- Genres: Hip hop; R&B; chicano rap
- Length: 45:32
- Label: Mercury
- Producers: Bob Skoro (exec.); Bruce Carbone (exec.); Mary McMartin (exec.); Robert Gutierrez; D'wayne Wiggins; Ernie Gonzalez; Gerry E. Brown; Hoods; Jammin' James Carter; J.D. Frump; L.A. Jay; Ricardo Royal; The Baka Boyz

Mercury Records compilation soundtracks chronology
| Falling from Grace (Original Motion Picture Soundtrack) (1992) | Mi Vida Loca (Original Motion Picture Soundtrack) (1994) | Jason's Lyric (Original Motion Picture Soundtrack) (1994) |

Allison Anders chronology
| Gas Food Lodging (Original Motion Picture Soundtrack) (1992) | Mi Vida Loca (Original Motion Picture Soundtrack) (1994) | Four Rooms (Original Motion Picture Soundtrack) (1995) |

Professional ratings
Review scores
| Source | Rating |
|---|---|
| AllMusic | 2/5 stars |

Mi Vida Loca (Original Motion Picture Soundtrack) is the soundtrack to Allison Anders' 1994 film Mi Vida Loca. It was released on March 8, 1994, via Mercury Records and consisted of hip hop and contemporary R&B music, with Jellybean Benitez serving as the soundtrack's supervisor. The album reached number 70 on the Billboard Top R&B/Hip-Hop Albums chart.

== Chart history ==
| Chart (1994) | Peak position |
|---|---|
| US Top R&B/Hip-Hop Albums (Billboard) | 70 |

== Track listing ==
| No. | Artist | Title | Songwriter(s) | Producer(s) | Length |
|---|---|---|---|---|---|
| 1 | Proper Dos | “Tales From The West Side” | Ernie Gonzalez; Frank Villareal | Ernie Gonzalez | 3:46 |
| 2 | Funkdoobiest | “The Good Hit” | Lawrence Muggerud; Jason Vasquez; Tyrone Pacheco; Ralph Medrano | DJ Muggs | 3:18 |
| 3 | A Tribe Called Quest | “If Papes Came Home (With Baby Bam)” | Ali Shaheed Muhammad; John William Davis; P. Hall | Hoods | 4:14 |
| 4 | Boss | “Run, Catch & Kill” | Sérgio Ricardo; Roger Tausz; Larry Presley | Ricardo Royal | 4:58 |
| 5 | Psycho Realm | “Scandalous” | Jose Martinez; Gustavo Gonzales; Jack Gonzales | The Baka Boyz | 3:36 |
| 6 | Shootyz Groove | “Crooked Is The Path” | Joan Baez; N. Ramirez; J. Rodriguez; M Rodriguez | Mark Dodson | 4:07 |
| 7 | A Lighter Shade of Brown | “Hey DJ” | Stephen Hague; Malcolm McLaren; Robert Anthony Gutierrez; Ronald J. Larkins; Bobby Bryan Ramirez; Larry Tyrone Price | Ricardo Gutierrez | 4:00 |
| 8 | Tony! Toni! Toné! | “Weather 42” | Dwayne P. Wiggins | D'Wayne Wiggins | 5:21 |
| 9 | A Lighter Shade of Brown | “Two Lovers” | James Stanley Carter; Smokey Robinson; Robert Anthony Gutierrez; Bobby Bryan Ramirez | James Carter | 3:32 |
| 10 | 4 Corners | “Suavecito” | Abel Zarate; Richard Bean; Pablo Téllez | Gerry E. Brown; John “L.A. Jay” Barnes III; Robert Von Arx | 4:37 |
| 11 | 4 Corners | “Girls It Ain’t Easy” | Robert Dunbar; Edythe Wayne | Rober Gutierrez|J.D. Frump | 3:59 |
