= The Purity Album =

Compilation album by SPM
- Released: August 15, 2000
- Genre: Chicano rap; gangsta rap
- Length: 1:13:50
- Label: Dope House; Universal
- Producer: Happy Perez; Shadow Ramirez; Massive; Tony G; Se7en; South Park Mexican; Mario Ayala; Hotan Kheyrandish; Jaime Ortiz; Orville Adams

South Park Mexican chronology
The 3rd Wish: To Rock the World (1999)	The Purity Album (2000)	Time Is Money (2000)

Professional ratings
Review scores
Source	Rating
AllMusic	2/5 stars

SPM Presents The Purity Album is a compilation album by American rapper SPM and his labelmates from Dope House Records. It was released on August 15, 2000, and this is the first of three albums to be released with Universal Records. The album debuted at number 57 on the Billboard 200 and number 26 on the Top R&B/Hip-Hop Albums charts. It contains the Tony G-produced hit single "You Know My Name", which peaked at #99 on the Hot R&B/Hip-Hop Songs and #31 on the Hot Rap Songs charts.

== Track listing ==
No.	Title	Producer(s)	Length
1.	"Dope House Intro" (performed by South Park Mexican & Courtney Jones)	Massive	1:39
2.	"You Know My Name" (performed by South Park Mexican & Miss Asiah)	Tony G.	4:44
3.	"Follow My Lead" (performed by South Park Mexican, Baby Beesh & Lucky Luciano)	Randy "Shadow" Ramirez	4:27
4.	"2 Joints" (performed by South Park Mexican, Dum Dum, Happy Perez, Low-G, Diamond, Grimm, Baby Beesh & Lil' Bing)	Se7en	4:44
5.	"Dope Game" (performed by South Park Mexican)	SPM	4:35
6.	"Rollin" (performed by South Park Mexican, Shadow Ramirez, Grimm & Lil' Bing)	Mario Ayala	3:56
7.	"Child of the Ghetto" (performed by Juan Gotti, Monster, Russell Lee & Skrilla)	Happy Perez	3:20
8.	"Watch the Block Bleed" (performed by Grimm & Ikeman)	Happy Perez	4:26
9.	"I Wanna Know Her Name" (performed by South Park Mexican, Baby Beesh, Low-G & Russell Lee)	Hotan Kheyrandish	4:03
10.	"Styrofoam Cup" (performed by Baby Beesh, Grimm, Ikeman, Lil Villain & Russell Lee)	Happy Perez	3:47
11.	"Meet Your Fate" (performed by Sevan & Pimpstress)	Happy Perez; Randy "Shadow" Ramirez	4:10
12.	"Cookie Baker" (performed by Lil' D, Guero & Smoke Dogg)	Happy Perez	4:02
13.	"We Did Dat" (performed by Hillwood Hustlers)	Happy Perez	3:19
14.	"Crazy Lady" (performed by Russell Lee)	Happy Perez	4:42
15.	"Whatever You Do" (performed by Low-G, Grimm, Happy Perez & Rasheed)	Happy Perez	4:04
16.	"I Am Your Future" (performed by Grimm)	Happy Perez	4:35
17.	"Problemas" (performed by Guero, Skrilla & Lupita)	Jaime "Pain" Ortiz	4:51
18.	"Right Now" (performed by Major Riley)	Orville Adams	3:42
Total length:			1:13:50

== Chart history ==
Chart (2000)	Peak position
US Billboard 200	57
US Top R&B/Hip-Hop Albums (Billboard)	26
