= Mi Vida Loca (disambiguation) =

Mi Vida Loca is a 1994 drama film.

Mi Vida Loca may also refer to:

- Mi Vida Loca (soundtrack), 1994 soundtrack album by various artists
- Mi Vida Loca (album), 2007 album by Jenni Rivera
- "Mi Vida Loca (My Crazy Life)", 1994 song by Pam Tillis
- Mi Vida Loca (professional wrestling), a professional wrestling stable

== See also ==
- Mi Vida Local, 2018 album by hip hop group Atmosphere
