= When Devils Strike =

Studio album by SPM
- Released: October 3, 2006
- Recorded: 2005–06
- Genre: Chicano rap; gangsta rap; chopped and screwed
- Label: Dope House; Swishahouse
- Producer: Arthur Coy Jr. (exec.); South Park Mexican; Happy Perez; Mario Ayala; Jaime "Pain" Ortiz; Tiger

SPM chronology
Reveille Park (2002)	When Devils Strike (2006)	The Last Chair Violinist (2008)

Professional ratings
Review scores
Source	Rating
RapReviews	6/10

When Devils Strike is the ninth solo studio album by American rapper SPM. It was released on October 3, 2006 via Dope House Records and Swishahouse.

== Background ==
The CD sold approximately 50,000 copies the first week and landed as #46 on the US Billboard 200 chart. The CD consists of 15 tracks. The album also comes with a free "Screwed & Chopped" version of the album by Michael "5000" Watts. At the time of the album's release, SPM was incarcerated.

== Track listing ==
No.	Title	Producer(s)	Length
1.	"At Shetoro's Crib (A Poem)" (featuring Carolyn Rodriguez)	South Park Mexican	3:20
2.	"The Day of Unity" (featuring Carolyn Rodriguez)	South Park Mexican	4:22
3.	"Garza West" (featuring Juan Gotti)	South Park Mexican	4:58
4.	"When Devils Strike"	Happy Perez	4:24
5.	"Something About Mary" (featuring Baby Bash & Russell Lee)	South Park Mexican	4:42
6.	"SPM Diaries" (featuring Rasheed)	Jaime "Pain" Ortiz	4:26
7.	"In My Hood"	Johnny "Tiger" Walker	5:44
8.	"Carolyn's Hook" (featuring Carolyn Rodriguez)	Mario Ayala	5:40
9.	"Real Gangsta" (featuring Juan Gotti)	South Park Mexican	4:28
10.	"S.P. So Bastardly" (featuring Coast)	South Park Mexican	4:55
11.	"Blazin' Janey" (featuring Carolyn Rodriguez & Powda)	South Park Mexican	3:44
12.	"If I Die" (featuring Coast)	South Park Mexican	4:27
13.	"Dope House Family" (featuring Baby Bash, Carolyn Rodriguez, Coast, Grimm, Juan Gotti, Low-G, Lucky Luciano, Powda, Quota Key & Rasheed)	South Park Mexican	11:20
14.	"Shout Outz"	Mario Ayala	6:48
15.	"Penitentiary Flow"	Jaime "Pain" Ortiz	2:07

== Chart history ==
Chart (2006)	Peak position
US Billboard 200	46
US Top R&B/Hip-Hop Albums (Billboard)	19
US Top Rap Albums (Billboard)	6
US Independent Albums (Billboard)	2
