= Hey DJ (The World's Famous Supreme Team song) =

"Hey! DJ"

Single by The World's Famous Supreme Team

from the album Rappin'
- Released: February 1984
- Genre: Hip hop
- Length: 6:10
- Label: Charisma
- Songwriters: Larry Price, Ronald Larkins Jr., Malcolm McLaren, Stephen Hague
- Producer: Stephen Hague

"Hey! DJ" is a song by The World's Famous Supreme Team. Writing is credited to Larry Price (Sedivine the Mastermind), Ronald Larkins Jr. (Just Allah the Superstar), and Malcolm McLaren and it was produced by Stephen Hague. Released on 12" in 1984 on Island Records, there were three mixes included. The song refers to McLaren's previous hit "Buffalo Gals", which the group featured on. "Hey DJ" peaked at number fifteen on the US soul chart.

== Release ==
"Hey D.J." was released in Europe on Charisma Records in February 1984. The song was released in the United States through Atlantic Records.

== Reception ==
From contemporary reviews, Jim Zebora of Record-Journal described the song as "one of the better raps to hit vinyl in recent memory" and a must-have for any record collector who "still spins 'Rapper's Delight' and 'The Breaks'." Musician Limahl reviewed the single in Smash Hits, noting that, despite them not working with Malcolm McLaren, the single has "got some really nice original bits and a lovely girl's voice [...] should be huge in the clubs."

In April 1989, Spin placed the song at number 64 on their list of their 100 greatest singles of all time.

== Music track listing ==
- Side 1.:
1. Hey DJ (Extended Version). - 06:10.
- Side 2.:
1. Hey DJ (Edit). - 04:08.
2. Hey DJ (Extended Instrumental Version). - 04:45.

== Credits ==
Credits adapted from the cover sleeve of the single.

- Stephen Hague – producer
- Walter Turbitt – engineer
- Nick Egan – cover design
- David Witchard – assistant cover design

== Chart performance ==
Chart (1984)	Peak position
US Billboard R&B	15

== Cover versions and samples ==
- In 1994, the rap duo A Lighter Shade of Brown recorded a version of the song, which was included in the film Mi Vida Loca. It is the first single from their third album Layin' in the Cut and the seventh track on the Mi Vida Loca soundtrack. It features smooth Chicano rap styles, a breezy summer party vibe. This version peaked at number sixty-seven on the soul chart and number forty-three on the Hot 100, It peaked at number 12 on the Australian ARIA Charts. and No. 18 on the Hot Rap Singles chart in 1994.
- The song was sampled on Mariah Carey's 1997 hit single, "Honey". Carey has stated that "Hey DJ" was always one of her favorite songs.
- The song was also sampled in the Beastie Boys song "Alright Hear This", from 1994's Ill Communication, and "Hey Ladies" from 1989's Paul's Boutique.
- AZ sampled the song for "Hey AZ" featuring SWV.
- Silkk the Shocker used interpolations for his song "All Night" on his album Charge It 2 da Game
- The song was heavily sampled in Japanese pop musician Toshiki Kadomatsu's song "Secret Lover", included in his 1985 album "Gold Digger".
- Warren G uses a sample of this song on his song "To all DJ´s"
- Lizzo's 2022 single "About Damn Time" uses compositional elements from the song.
