= Christine Wu =

Taiwanese-German-American violinist

- Instrument(s): Violin, cello
- Years active: 2001–present

Christine Wu is a musician who plays and composes for acoustic and electric violin and cello. Born to a Taiwanese father and a German American mother in Germany, she moved to the United States at a young age. She began her professional career as an orchestral musician before relocating to Los Angeles to work in the recording, film, and television industries. She performs, composes, and arranges for live performances, records, film and gaming soundtracks and commercial jingles.

== Education ==
Wu began studying violin at age two-and-a-half using the Suzuki method.

She completed a four-year degree in violin performance from Duquesne University. She went on to earn a Master of Music from the University of Southern California with a full scholarship, studying with pedagogue Robert Lipsett of the Colburn School.

== Performance highlights ==
As of February 2017, Wu is the touring solo violinist with the Game of Thrones Live Concert Experience. After graduating from Duquesne, she toured for one year with the St. Louis Symphony orchestra. In 2001, after graduating from USC, she obtained a tenured position with the Houston Symphony, becoming one of their youngest members. Her years as an orchestral violinist took her to Carnegie Hall and many other concert halls throughout the U.S., Europe and the Caribbean.

In 2006 Wu relocated to Los Angeles, California to write and perform.

She has since performed as soloist, arranged, and recorded for David Foster, Paul Anka, Billy Ray Cyrus, A.R. Rahman, and Lorne Balfe.

She has also performed on The Voice, American Idol, Dancing with the Stars, The Tonight Show, and the Grammy Awards telecast.

In 2014 she received notoriety for playing the electric violin while doing a backbend in Billy Ray Cyrus' video for "Achy Breaky 2", a remake of "Achy Breaky Heart".

Wu worked with rap star South Park Mexican (SPM) on the album The Last Chair Violinist. She was featured on the songs "Are We Real" and "The Last Chair Violinist".

== Instruments ==
Wu plays a 1777 Lorenzo Storioni violin, and a Yamaha SV-255 and SVC-110SK. She also plays and composes on a Bösendorfer 185 piano.
