= Reveille Park =

Studio album by SPM
- Released: May 5, 2002
- Genres: Chicano rap; gangsta rap; freestyle rap
- Length: 1:12:29
- Label: Dope House Records
- Producers: Arthur Coy Jr. (exec.); Filero; South Park Mexican; Shadow Ramirez

SPM chronology
| Never Change: The Pain And Glory Album (2001) | Reveille Park (2002) | When Devils Strike (2006) |

Professional ratings
Review scores
| Source | Rating |
|---|---|
| AllMusic | 3/5 stars |

Reveille Park is the eighth album by American rapper SPM. It was released on Dope House Records in 2002 shortly after SPM was incarcerated for sexual assault. Most of the tracks on this album are freestyle rapping. There was a "Chopped & Screwed" version of the album released on August 26, 2002. Coy stated that the entire album was recorded in two days. It was recorded at his house by his long-time friend and record producer Filero, who also added to the production of the album. It was mixed and mastered by James Hoover at Digital Services in Houston, Texas.

== Track listing ==
| No. | Title | Length |
|---|---|---|
| 1. | "Juan Gotti's Chic" (skit) | 0:32 |
| 2. | "The Beach House" | 5:03 |
| 3. | "Woodson N Worthin'" (featuring Low-G) | 6:37 |
| 4. | "Red Beans & Rice" (featuring Juan Gotti & Mark Schooler) | 6:00 |
| 5. | "Hotel Lady" (skit) | 0:57 |
| 6. | "Suckerz N Hataz" (featuring JC & Uchie) | 5:17 |
| 7. | "Iatola" | 4:13 |
| 8. | "DJ Screw" (Live) (skit) (Recorded at a Dallas Concert) | 0:19 |
| 9. | "Dallas to Houston" | 5:39 |
| 10. | "Lobo Wanna Raise" (featuring Uchie) | 5:39 |
| 11. | "Get Yo Guns" (featuring Big Flake) | 5:19 |
| 12. | "Moham Mitchell" | 4:44 |
| 13. | "Lord Loco's Melody" (featuring JC) | 4:20 |
| 14. | "Honest Man" (skit) | 0:38 |
| 15. | "Screwed Up Tape" (featuring Low-G & Rasheed) | 4:29 |
| 16. | "For da Homies" | 4:39 |
| 17. | "I Need a Sweet" (featuring Baby Beesh & Angela Perez) | 4:10 |
| 18. | "Cool Enough" (featuring JC) | 3:54 |
| 19. | "A Moment of Silence for "Those Ahead of Us"" | 0:11 |
| Total length: | | 1:12:29 |

== Chart history ==
| Chart (2002) | Peak position |
|---|---|
| US Billboard 200 | 149 |
| US Top R&B/Hip-Hop Albums (Billboard) | 48 |
| US Independent Albums (Billboard) | 8 |
