= If You Could See Inside Me =

Studio album by A Lighter Shade of Brown
- Released: August 10, 1999
- Recorded: 1999
- Genre: Hip hop
- Length: 38:54
- Label: Associated Records
- Producer: Antonio Mendoza (exec.); David Ortiz (exec.); Vincent Sorrentino (exec.); Lighter Shade of Brown; Julio G; Tony G

A Lighter Shade of Brown chronology
Lighter Shade of Brown (1997)	If You Could See Inside Me (1999)	Greatest Hits (1999)

Professional ratings
Review scores
Source	Rating
AllMusic	3/5 stars

If You Could See Inside Me is an American Hip-hop music album, and it is the fifth and final studio album by A Lighter Shade of Brown. It was released on August 10, 1999 through Associated Records. Production was handled by One Dope Mexican, Julio G, Tony G and DTTX. It features guest appearances from A.L.T., Jay Tee, Kid Frost and Steve Wilcox.

== Track listing ==
1. "Next To Ball"- 3:43
2. "Major League"- 4:26
3. "JD Interlude"- 0:56 (featuring Steve Wilcox)
4. "Presidential"- 4:22 (featuring Kid Frost and Jay Tee)
5. "Hardcore Spirits"- 4:36 (featuring A.L.T.)
6. "If You Could See Inside Me"- 4:01
7. "Gonna Give It To You"- 3:54
8. "Sunny Day"- 4:32
9. "Party Don't Start"- 4:26
10. "Paradise"- 4:16
11. "(Hidden Track)"
