= Eastside Drama =

Studio album by Brownside
- Released: July 12, 1997
- Genres: West Coast hip-hop; Gangsta rap; Chicano rap/Sureño rap; G-Funk
- Length: 59:09
- Labels: East Town Records; Triple X Records
- Producers: Brownside members; Julio G; Tony G; Richard "Rikko" Preuss

Brownside chronology
| Eastside Drama (1997) | Payback (1999) |

Eastside Drama is the debut studio album by American/Chicano rap group Brownside, released on June 12, 1997 under East Town Records and Triple X Records. The tracks on this album were produced by Brownside, Julio G, Tony G, and Richard "Rikko" Preuss. The album includes street lyricism with heavily polished West Coast production. Musically, it is heavily rooted in the classic G-Funk style, featuring deep basslines, smooth talkbox elements, and prominent synth keys. Music critics note that while the lyrical themes are raw and typical of hardcore gangsta rap, the energy and vital, funky rhythm of the production elevate it above many contemporary underground releases of its era.

== Musical style ==
The production blends heavy, rolling West Coast basslines, laid-back funk interpolations, and synthesized melodies characteristic of 1990s G-Funk (including influences from producers like Cold 187um). The lyrical content is raw, unapologetic, and street-oriented, focusing on urban life, varrio culture, crime, and survival in Los Angeles. The album features signature West Coast samples and interpolations of classic tracks, such as "Computer Love", "Don't Stop the Music" by Yarbrough and Peoples, and N.W.A's "Boyz-n-the-Hood").

== Critical reception ==
Critics described the record as an intriguing balance of edgy hardcore rap and funky Latino hip-hop. While noting that the lyrics could occasionally feel perfunctory, reviews highlighted the music as vital, energetic, and more compelling than many of the group's contemporary peers. Among underground hip-hop and Chicano rap communities, the album is celebrated as a cult classic and one of the hardest regional records of the 1990s. Fans frequently cite it as an underrated gem that delivered an unvarnished street perspective from South Los Angeles' Eastside.

== Track listing ==
All tracks are written by Brownside (Toker and Wicked).

| No. | Title | Music producer(s) | Length |
|---|---|---|---|
| 1. | "Payback" (Intro) | | 0:50 |
| 2. | "Another Crazy Day" | Julio G; Tony G | 3:44 |
| 3. | "KBRN" (Julio G interview) | | 0:38 |
| 4. | "So Ruff" | The Unknown DJ | 4:53 |
| 5. | "Danger R.I.P." (Julio G interview) | | 0:47 |
| 6. | "Life on the Streets" | Julio G; Tony G | 3:48 |
| 7. | "Gangsters P.O.V." | Toker | 4:20 |
| 8. | "Last Day" (featuring Rich Garcia) | Richard Preuss | 5:25 |
| 9. | "Can't Stop the Southland" | Julio G; Tony G | 3:57 |
| 10. | "Look Through My Eyes" | The Unknown DJ | 5:23 |
| 11. | "Hookin' up with crazy E." (Julio G interview) | | 1:03 |
| 12. | "Vatos 'N the Varrio" | Julio G; Tony G | 5:26 |
| 13. | "Creepin'" | Richard Preuss | 5:06 |
| 14. | "People vs. Toker" | The Unknown DJ | 3:48 |
| 15. | "Do or Die" | Richard Preuss | 4:48 |
| 16. | "I Never Thought" (Julio G interview) | | 0:46 |
| 17. | "Rest in Peace" | Julio G; Tony G | 4:28 |
