= Never Change (album) =

Never Change: The Pain and Glory Album

Studio album by South Park Mexican
- Released: December 4, 2001
- Genres: Chicano rap; gangsta rap; chopped and screwed
- Length: 1:13:29
- Labels: Dope House; Universal
- Producers: South Park Mexican; Delwin "Mad Reel" Bell; Happy Perez; Jamie Ortiz; Shadow Ramirez

South Park Mexican chronology
Time Is Money (2000)	Never Change: The Pain and Glory Album (2001)	Reveille Park (2002)

Singles from Never Change: The Pain and Glory Album
- 1. "I Must Be High" Released: 2001

Professional ratings
Review scores
Source	Rating
AllMusic	3/5 stars

Never Change: The Pain and Glory Album is the seventh solo studio album by American rapper South Park Mexican. It was released in late 2001 under a joint venture between Dope House Records and Universal Records.

== Track listing ==
No.	Title	Producer(s)	Length
1.	"Screens Falling" (featuring Ayana & Coast)	SPM	3:55
2.	"All Cot Up" (featuring Ayana)	Randy "Shadow" Ramirez	4:20
3.	"Habitual Criminal" (featuring Ayana)	SPM	4:50
4.	"I Must Be High" (featuring Russell Lee)	SPM	4:44
5.	"Bloody War"	SPM	4:13
6.	"Mexican Radio"	SPM	4:44
7.	"Hubba Hubba" (featuring Baby Beesh & Rasheed)	Delwin "Madd Real" Bell	3:54
8.	"SPM vs. Los"	SPM	4:49
9.	"Filthy Rich"	SPM	4:42
10.	"Los" (Screwed)	SPM	3:42
11.	"One of Those Nights" (featuring Ayana & Uchie)	SPM	3:54
12.	"High Everyday" (Screwed) (featuring Ayana)	SPM	4:50
13.	"Stay on Your Grind" (Screwed)	SPM	5:26
14.	"Broadway" (featuring Rasheed)	SPM	4:32
15.	"The System"	Jaime "Pain" Ortiz	4:50
16.	"Never Change"	Happy Perez	4:37
17.	"The End" (featuring Juan Gotti)		1:31
Total length:			1:13:29

== Chart history ==
Chart (2001)	Peak position
US Billboard 200	168
US Top R&B/Hip-Hop Albums (Billboard)	40
