= Power Moves: The Table =

Studio album by SPM
- Released: December 22, 1998
- Recorded: 1998
- Genre: Chicano rap; gangsta rap; chopped and screwed
- Label: Dope House Records
- Producer: Arthur Coy Jr. (exec.); South Park Mexican (exec.)

SPM chronology
Hustle Town (1998)	Power Moves: The Table (1998)	The 3rd Wish: To Rock the World (1999)

Professional ratings
Review scores
Source	Rating
AllMusic	4/5 stars

Power Moves: The Table is the third solo studio album released by SPM. It was released on December 22, 1998 via Dope House Records. The album also contains a screwed bonus disc by DJ Screw called "Screwing Up the World".

== Track listing ==
No.	Title	Length
1.	"Where My Soldiers At" (featuring A.C. Chill & Rasheed)	4:17
2.	"Cali-Tex Connect" (featuring Frost)	4:37
3.	"Illegal Amigos" (featuring Blunt Masta C, K-Sam, Nino, & Liz)	5:34
4.	"West Coast, Gulf Coast, East Coast" (featuring Baby Beesh, Frost, Low-G & Rasheed)	3:47
5.	"El Jugador" (featuring Frost & Low-G)	3:09
6.	"Y Must I" (featuring Tommy G & Pancho Villa)	5:05
7.	"Since Day 1" (featuring The Most Hated)	4:28
8.	"Studio Time" (featuring Dope E & Rasheed)	4:50
9.	"Power Moves" (featuring Bushwick Bill)	4:15
10.	"Holla Atcha Later" (featuring Double D, Tyte Eyes & Chicken Hawk)	4:11
11.	"Pass the Killa" (featuring Baby Beesh & Major Riley)	4:27
12.	"Peace Pipe" (featuring 2Tone & Lil Russ)	4:35
13.	"Wheel Watchers" (featuring Marilyn Rylander)	4:37
14.	"Ghetto Tales" (featuring A.C. Chill & L.T.)	3:48
15.	"Runaway" (featuring Ayana M)	3:15
16.	"VIP" (featuring Big Boss & Pancho Villa)	4:04
