= Hillwood (album) =

Studio album by South Park Mexican
- Released: March 14, 1995
- Recorded: 1994
- Studio: Track Design (Houston, Texas)
- Genre: Chicano rap; gangsta rap
- Length: 57:04
- Label: Dope House Records
- Producer: Arthur Coy Jr. (exec.); Delwin "Mad Reel" Bell; Bernie Bismark; South Park Mexican

South Park Mexican chronology
Hillwood (1995)	Hustle Town (1998)

Professional ratings
Review scores
Source	Rating
AllMusic	2/5 stars

Hillwood is the debut album by Texas-based rapper South Park Mexican. It was released via Dope House Records in early 1995.

The album's title comes from the unincorporated neighborhood of Hillwood in the southside region of Houston. He sold the album from the trunk of his car, flea markets, and at car shows for $5 each.

== Track listing ==
No.	Title	Producer(s)	Length
1.	"Comin Up Comin Down"	Delwin "Mad Reel" Bell	3:55
2.	"Revenge"	Delwin "Mad Reel" Bell	5:29
3.	"Hillwood"	Delwin "Mad Reel" Bell	4:11
4.	"H-Town G-Funk"	Delwin "Mad Reel" Bell	5:08
5.	"Children of the Ghetto"	Bernie Bismark	4:28
6.	"Freeworld to the Pen"	Delwin "Mad Reel" Bell	5:44
7.	"Comin Up Comin Down" (Remix)	Delwin "Mad Reel" Bell	5:07
8.	"Vengeance" (Remix)	Delwin "Mad Reel" Bell	7:10
9.	"Hellified Hills" (Remix)	Delwin "Mad Reel" Bell	5:22
10.	"Children of the Ghetto" (Remix)	Bernie Bismark	5:28
11.	"Deep Instrumental"	SPM	4:57
Total length:			57:04

== Personnel ==
- Carlos Coy – main artist, producer (track 11)
- Delwin "Mad Reel" Bell – keyboards, producer (tracks: 1–4, 6–9)
- Bernie Bismark – producer (tracks: 5, 10)
- Steven "Dope E" Baggett – drum programming (track 11)
- Shetoro Henderson – mixing, mastering, engineering
- Arthur Coy Jr. – executive producer
- Jimmy Stephens – art direction
- Romero – photography
