= Robert Gutierrez =

Robert Gutierrez may refer to:

- Staff Sgt. Robert Gutierrez, a decorated USAF Combat Controller
- ODM (Robert Gutierrez), member of the American hip hop duo A Lighter Shade of Brown
