= Homies (A Lighter Shade of Brown song) =

1992 single by A Lighter Shade of Brown

Single by A Lighter Shade of Brown

from the album Hip Hop Locos
- Released: September 29, 1992
- Genre: Hip hop
- Length: 3:31
- Label: Pump
- Songwriters: Robert Gutierrez; Bobby Ramirez; James Carter; William Robinson
- Producer: Jammin' James Carter

A Lighter Shade of Brown singles chronology
"Spill the Rhyme" (1992)	"Homies" (1992)	"Check it Out" (1993)

Music video
- "Homies" on YouTube

"Homies" is a song by American hip hop duo A Lighter Shade of Brown and was released in September 1992 by label Pump as the second single from their second studio album, Hip Hop Locos (1992). It was produced by Jammin' James Carter. The song peaked at numbers 56 and 57 on the US Cash Box Top 100 and Billboard Hot 100 charts.

== Background and composition ==
DTTX stated regarding to the song, "We were writing about some of the feelings two friends go through when they grow up together, from youth to old age. Everybody–Latino or not–can relate to that."

The song also contains a sample of "Tracks of My Tears" by The Miracles.

== Charts ==
Chart (1992)	Peak position
Australia (ARIA)	115
US Billboard Hot 100	57
US Hot R&B/Hip-Hop Songs (Billboard)	54
US Rhythmic (Billboard)	37
US Cash Box Top 100	56
