= Hustle Town =

Studio album by South Park Mexican
- Released: March 3, 1998
- Recorded: 1996–1997
- Studio: Track Design (Houston, Texas)
- Genre: Chicano rap; gangsta rap
- Length: 1:10:40
- Label: Dope House Records
- Producer: Arthur Coy Jr. (exec.)

South Park Mexican chronology
Hillwood (1995)	Hustle Town (1998)	Power Moves: The Table (1998)

Professional ratings
Review scores
Source	Rating
AllMusic	2/5 stars

Hustle Town is the second album by American rapper South Park Mexican. It was released on March 3, 1998, via Dope House Records. The album contains the hit single "Mary-Go-Round", which was an underground hit and it broke him out of Texas.

== Track listing ==
No.	Title	Length
1.	"Streets on Beats" (featuring Low-G)	5:16
2.	"Riddla on the Roof" (featuring Rasheed & Robin)	4:54
3.	"Night Shift" (featuring Pimpstress)	5:06
4.	"Ghetto Imprisonment" (Performed by Grinch)	5:29
5.	"Block of Rock" (featuring Eddie G, Jose "Blocc" DeLeon & Low-G)	5:42
6.	"Mary-Go-Round" (featuring Rasheed & Low-G)	4:21
7.	"Wizard of Oz" (featuring Sonja Otero)	5:16
8.	"Hustle Town" (featuring Filero & Lord Loco)	4:28
9.	"Runaway" (Remix) (featuring Ayana)	4:52
10.	"Streets" (Remix) (featuring Low-G)	6:35
11.	"Imprisonment" (Remix) (Performed by Grinch)	6:22
12.	"Graveyards" (Remix) (featuring Pimpstress)	6:07
13.	"For Years" (Remix) (featuring Eddie G, Jose "Blocc" DeLeon & Low-G)	6:35
Total length:		1:10:40

== Personnel ==
- Carlos Coy – main artist
- Wilson Flores – featured artist (tracks: 1, 5, 6)
- Alfonso Cook – featured artist (tracks: 2, 6)
- Lawrence Gurule – featured artist (tracks: 8–13)
- Shetoro Henderson – engineering & mastering
- Arthur Coy Jr. – executive producer
- Jimmy Stephens – artwork
- Pen & Pixel – design
