= The 3rd Wish: To Rock the World =

Studio album by South Park Mexican
- Released: November 23, 1999
- Genre: Southern hip-hop; Chicano rap; gangsta rap
- Length: 1:13:15
- Label: Dope House Records
- Producer: Arthur Coy Jr. (exec.); South Park Mexican (exec.); Happy Perez; Shadow Ramirez; Delwin "Mad Reel" Bell; Hotan Kheyrandish; 2Tone; Mario Ayala; Mario B; Randy Jefferson; Sammy Huen

South Park Mexican chronology
Power Moves: The Table (1998)	The 3rd Wish: To Rock the World (1999)	Time Is Money (2000)

The 3rd Wish: To Rock the World (sometimes just called The 3rd Wish) is the fourth studio album by American rapper South Park Mexican. It was released on November 23, 1999 via Dope House Records.

== Commercial performance ==
The 3rd Wish was a Houston area hit, with the single "High So High" gaining much local buzz and even charting at #50 on the Billboard Hot Rap Tracks chart. The 3rd Wish is Coy's first album to chart, peaking at #89 on the Top R&B/Hip-Hop Albums with 60,000 copies sold in the first week released. This eventually lead to SPM signing a joint venture between his label and Universal Music Group in 2000 which earned him a $500,000 advance and national distribution.

== Reception ==
Professional ratings
Review scores
Source	Rating
AllMusic	3/5 stars

"Rapper SPM acknowledges a past as a drug dealer, and that former occupation continues to inform his approach to his current career, from the name of his record label, Dope House, to the subject matter of his raps. His is a world of crime and retribution, expressed in language laced with the usual epithets and expletives. The raps are slower and more deliberate, the music more melodic than most other rap, and there are occasional surprises. 'Land of The Lost' is a melodramatic narrative that looks back with regret, while 'Miss Perfect' is a love rap, an unabashed tribute to SPM's wife. Like other rap label heads, the artist uses his own albums to introduce other rappers on his label. In fact, the album is basically a label sampler, featuring 23 rappers and groups in addition to SPM himself and containing tracks from upcoming Dope House releases. Four of the 16 tracks don't even feature the artist. Nevertheless, he remains the most distinctive presence on the album, and his perspective, while including much of the standard-issue opinions and expressions of the genre, is individual enough to be distinctive." - William Ruhlman, AllMusic

== Track listing ==
No.	Title	Producer(s)	Length
1.	"High So High" (featuring Marilyn Rylander)	Randy "Shadow" Ramirez	3:51
2.	"Latin Throne" (featuring Marilyn Rylander)	Sammy "The Magician" Huen	4:19
3.	"The 3rd Wish" (featuring Marilyn Rylander)	2-Tone	5:31
4.	"Loyal Customers" (featuring Rasheed)	Randy Jefferson	3:31
5.	"Creep With Me" (Performed by Guero, Lex, Lil D & Smoke Dogg)	Happy Perez	4:13
6.	"Thug Girl" (featuring Low-G & Pimpstress)	Randy "Shadow" Ramirez	4:29
7.	"Wiggy Wiggy" (featuring Baby Beesh)	Delwin "Mad Reel" Bell	4:35
8.	"Mi Ruka" (Performed by Low-G)	Happy Perez	3:35
9.	"Land of the Lost" (featuring Marilyn Rylander)	Hotan Kheyrandish	4:03
10.	"Reminisce" (Performed by Rasheed)	Mario B	4:07
11.	"Hillwood Hustlaz" (featuring Grimm & Rasheed)	Delwin "Mad Reel" Bell	4:08
12.	"Who's Over There?" (featuring Low-G & Marilyn Rylander)	Happy Perez	4:51
13.	"Miss Perfect" (featuring Ikeman)	Hotan Kheyrandish	4:01
14.	"Ballaticians" (Performed by Grimm & Rasheed)	Mario Ayala	4:49
15.	"Don't Hide It" (Performed by Grimm, Ikeman & Lil Bing)	Happy Perez	3:24
16.	"Valley" (featuring Ace Deuce, Grimm, LT, Mike Littles, Monster, Pancho Villa, Pimpstress, Rasheed, Skrilla, Shoe Lace, Star Baby & Ikeman)	Randy "Shadow" Ramirez	10:06
Total length:			1:13:15

== Chart history ==
Chart (1999–2000)	Peak position
US Top R&B/Hip-Hop Albums (Billboard)	89
US Independent Albums (Billboard)	17
US Heatseekers Albums (Billboard)	9
