= Johnny Flamingo =

- Birth name: Melvin James Moore
- Also known as: Melvin Broxton
- Born: January 13, 1934; Houston, Texas, United States
- Died: December 24, 2000 (aged 66); Los Angeles, California, United States
- Genres: R&B, pop
- Occupation(s): Singer, lyricist
- Instrument: Vocals
- Years active: Mid-1950s–1970s
- Labels: Caddy, Aladdin, Specialty

Johnny Flamingo, born Melvin James Moore (January 13, 1934 – December 24, 2000) was an American rhythm and blues singer and lyricist.

== Biography ==
He was born in Houston, Texas, the son of Grant Moore and Gladys Gilmore, and grew up as Melvin Broxton after taking the name of his stepfather. He joined the US Air Force and served in Europe where he performed as a member of a vocal group, the Five Criteria. In 1956 he returned to Los Angeles, where radio DJ Dick "Huggy Boy" Hugg reportedly gave him the stage name Johnny Flamingo.

He joined a vocal doo-wop group, the Dots, formed by singer Jeanette Baker, and became their lead tenor on recordings on Hugg's Caddy label, including "I Confess", a song covered by Paul Anka as his first record. Flamingo and Baker married, and Flamingo left the group in 1957 for a solo career. He released a series of singles in the late 1950s and early 1960s, on various labels including Caddy, Aladdin, and Specialty. He also recorded and performed with his wife, Jeanette Baker, and performed regularly at a club, the Den, in Norwalk, California. Flamingo sang rock and roll as well as ballad songs in the style of Nat King Cole. In 1959 he released an LP, Johnny Flamingo Sings in the Wee Small Hours, featuring Gaynel Hodge on piano, released on the Diadon label owned by Joe Serrano. Flamingo is also credited as the lyricist on some versions of the originally instrumental hits "Wheels" and "Apache".

Johnny Flamingo died in Los Angeles in 2000, from cancer and emphysema.

In 2000 David Cassidy used the same name for his fictional lead character in the Las Vegas show At the Copa, in which Cassidy played both the young and old versions of the character.

== Discography ==
- Johnny Flamingo Sings in the Wee Small Hours
- "Make Me A Present Of You" / "Teenage Theme" 1957
- "My Teen Age Girl" / When I Lost You 1957
- "Make Me A Present Of You" / "So Long" 1957
- "Will She Think Of Me" / "Paradise Hill" 1958
- "Is It A Dream" / You're Mine 1962
- "Drive Slow" / "This Was Really Love" 1964
