= The Tax Collector =

2020 American action thriller film

- Official promotional poster
- Directed by: David Ayer
- Written by: David Ayer
- Produced by: Chris Long; David Ayer; Tyler Thompson; Matt Antoun
- Starring: Bobby Soto; Cinthya Carmona; George Lopez; Shia LaBeouf
- Cinematography: Salvatore Totino
- Edited by: Geoffrey O'Brien
- Music by: Michael Yezerski
- Production companies: Cross Creek Pictures; Cedar Park Entertainment; iWood Studios; Atwater Capital
- Distributed by: RLJE Films
- Release dates: July 30, 2020 (Vineland Drive-In); August 7, 2020 (United States)
- Running time: 95 minutes
- Country: United States
- Language: English
- Budget: $4 million
- Box office: $1.3 million

The Tax Collector is a 2020 American action thriller film written, directed, and produced by David Ayer. The film stars Bobby Soto, Cinthya Carmona, George Lopez, and Shia LaBeouf, and follows two enforcers (known as "tax collectors") working for a Los Angeles crime lord whose business becomes upended, resulting in one of them desperately protecting his family from an old rival.

The Tax Collector was released in the United States on August 7, 2020, by RLJE Films. The film was panned by critics and it grossed $1.3 million against a budget of $4 million, making it a box office bomb.

== Plot ==
In Los Angeles, David Cuevas lives with his wife Alexis and their two children. As Alexis' family prepares for her niece's quinceañera, David arrives at his auto electronics store, where he employs his cousin Lupe. Joined by his partner Creeper, David receives a payment from Victor, a newly promoted gangster; David and Creeper are "tax collectors", enforcers who collect a cut of the profits from 43 local gangs for their boss Wizard, who runs his far-reaching criminal enterprise from prison. David and Creeper visit David's uncle Louis, confirming Victor's payment, and collect other gangs' payments throughout the city.

Learning that a member of his crew has abducted a member of the Bloods for sleeping with his girlfriend, David rescues the Blood, leaving his kidnapper to be beaten for nearly inciting a gang war. David and Creeper return the man on peaceful terms to the Bloods' leader, Bone, and Alexis summons David to intimidate another family out of buying the dress her niece wants. Alexis discovers Victor's payment is $20,000 short, and David and Creeper track him down. At gunpoint, he admits to skimming the money to pay for his daughter's leukemia treatment; David, a devoted family man himself, lets Victor keep the money.

David and Creeper visit an associate named Venom for a $200,000 payment, but are met by Conejo, a rival gang leader who declares that Venom now works for him, forcing them to leave empty-handed. David informs Louis, who explains that Conejo was a rival of Wizard who retreated to Mexico, earning a reputation for ruthlessness. Creeper is eager to eliminate Conejo, but Louis requires a vote from fellow gang leaders. Alexis reassures David of her love for him and their life together, and David struggles at his Brazilian Jiu-Jitsu class.

During the quinceañera at the Cuevas' house, Louis leaves to meet with Conejo. David's sister Delia asks if he has spoken to their father, which David denies, and he and Alexis share a dance. Conejo's underling Gata arrives and orders David and Creeper to join the meeting, where Conejo presents them with Louis' severed head and hands. He invites them to join his organization for the power and recognition Wizard has denied them, but David and Creeper leave in silence. Planning retaliation, David's men urge him to leave town. After Conejo performs a ritualistic human sacrifice at his hideout, Gata and Conejo's heavily armed men attack David's shop with a pipe bomb, killing David's men and capturing Creeper.

David escapes and rushes his family to safety, but is forced to watch by video call as Gata smashes Creeper's legs with a hammer before Conejo stomps him to death. Leaving Alexis at a hotel to send their children with her sister Favi, David digs up a stash of over $1.6 million from Lupe's yard. Returning to the hotel, David finds Alexis dead. Stricken with grief, he discovers Favi does not have his children; Conejo, having abducted them and killed Alexis, calls David and gives him two hours to meet with a ransom. David goes to Bone, who gathers volunteers to rescue his children.

Raiding a drug house, they interrogate one of Conejo's men, dragging his face along the ground from a moving car, and kill him after finding an address on his phone. They arrive to find David's children safe, with no one there but Conejo's grandmother. When David spares her life, saying that family is sacred, she voluntarily gives up Conejo's location. At Conejo's hideout, David strangles a guard, while Bone is nearly captured but kills two members of Conejo's crew. Bursting into Conejo's room, David kills Gata, but Conejo gains the upper hand as they brawl in the bathroom. Drawing on his Brazilian Jiu-Jitsu lessons and memories of Alexis, David overpowers Conejo and kills him with a broken sink.

As Bone drives him to have his wounds treated, David asks him to pull over and calls Wizard, who is revealed to be his father. Refusing to follow in his footsteps, David hangs up; touching his rosary, Wizard asks for forgiveness.

== Cast ==
- Bobby Soto as David Cuevas, a tax collector and Creeper's friend / partner
- Shia LaBeouf as "Creeper", a tax collector working for a crime lord known as Wizard, he is David's best friend and the two share a long history. Creeper is prone to extreme violence, at times killing and dismembering rival gang members without compunction.
- Cinthya Carmona as Alexis Cuevas, David's wife
- George Lopez as Uncle Louis, David's fraternal uncle and direct superior in Wizard's organization.
- Jay Reeves as "Peanut"
- Lana Parrilla as Favi, David's sister-in-law
- Chelsea Rendon as Lupe, David and Delia's cousin who manages one of his dummy corporations.
- Cheyenne Hernandez as "Gata", Conejo's girlfriend / part of the Cartel's hit squad.
- Gabriela Flores as Jazmin
- Elpidia Carrillo as Janet
- Jose "Conejo" Martin as "Conejo", a Satanic enforcer for the Mexican Drug Cartels.
- Brian Ortega as "Venom"
- Brendan Schaub as Patrick "Fat Patrick"
- Jimmy Smits as "Wizard" Cuevas, an imprisoned Mexican Mafia crime lord and David's father.
- Cle Shaheed Sloan as "Bone", the shot caller of the Bloods, and from Training Day.

== Production ==
On June 21, 2018, it was announced that Shia LaBeouf and David Ayer would team up for the film The Tax Collector. In July 2018, Chelsea Rendon, Cinthya Carmona, Lana Parrilla, Gabriela Flores and George Lopez joined the cast of the film. For his role in the film, LaBeouf got his entire chest tattooed.

Principal photography began on July 16, 2018, and ended on August 16, 2018.

== Release ==
In May 2020, RLJE Films acquired distribution rights to the film. It released the film in limited theaters and digitally on demand on August 7, 2020. Due to the COVID-19 pandemic, the film held its premiere at the Vineland Drive-In theatre in City of Industry, California on July 30, 2020.

== Reception ==
=== Box office and VOD ===
In its debut weekend, The Tax Collector was the most rented film on FandangoNow, Apple TV, the iTunes Store, and Google Play, was the fifth-most rented film on Amazon Prime, and made an estimated $1–2 million from VOD sales. It also made $309,694 from 129 theaters, becoming the third film to ever top both VOD charts and the box office in the same weekend. The following weekend the film made $203,722 from 138 theaters (for a 10-day gross of $634,145), and remained first on rental charts, with a running digital sales total of about $5 million. The film made $121,800 from 121 theaters in its third weekend. It remained in the top five across all platforms in the following weeks, including number one on Spectrum.

=== Critical response ===
On review aggregator Rotten Tomatoes, the film holds an approval rating of 17% based on 70 reviews, with an average rating of 3.7/10. The website's critics consensus reads, "A taxing and ill-advised crime drama, The Tax Collector fails to accrue much meaningful interest." On Metacritic, the film has a weighted average score of 22 out of 100, based on 14 critics, indicating "generally unfavorable reviews".

Writing for The Hollywood Reporter, David Rooney said, "Ayer drives the action along efficiently enough to the churning dread of Michael Yezerski's score. But there's too little depth to make you care about the characters and too little imagination at work to make The Tax Collector pay." Eric Kohn, of IndieWire, gave the film a "D+" and wrote, "With so much mismatched content and only 90-odd minutes to pull it off, The Tax Collector stuffs in the most exciting showdown into its closing minutes as an afterthought."

=== Accolades ===
Award	Category	Recipient(s)	Result	Ref.
Golden Raspberry Awards	Worst Supporting Actor	Shia LaBeouf	Nominated	

== Soundtrack ==
=== Track listing ===
1. Last Night (Tru Life & Future)
2. Love & Hate (Michael Kiwanuka (as Michael Samuel Kiwanuka))
3. Where's the Soul of Man (Mike James Kirkland)
4. Somebody Please (The Vanguards)
5. Play God (Sam Fender)
6. Fulete (Anuel AA)
7. Sideways (Citizen Cope (as Clarence Greenwood))
8. El Ache Uno (Jose Conejo Martin (as Conejo) feat. Rancho y Barrio)
9. Eres Tu Trad Mix (Cuñao)
10. Raices (Orquesta Mazacote)
11. Alive (obylx)
12. Gritty (T. Flex)
13. Machine (Deadfellow)
14. Blood in the Cut (K.Flay (as Kristine Flaherty))
15. By the River (Stu Larsen)
16. Chasing Heaven (Bassnectar & Levitate)
17. L.H.N.A. (Robgz & Anuel AA)
18. Oats in the Water (Ben Howard)
19. Parachute (Thee Lakesiders)
