= Darkroom Familia =

Californian rap group

Darkroom Familia is an American Chicano rap group with artists from various parts of Northern California. They were originally formed in 1988. Like other burgeoning gangster rappers of the era, major labels weren't quick to sign such bands, so the band members had to sell their tapes by taking them personally to record stores in the area as word of mouth quickly began to spread. Darkroom Familia became one of rap's most prolific bands, issuing albums (whether it be by the band or solo releases by its members) at an extremely brisk rate. They also released one of the first all Spanish rap albums Los Traficantes - Matan Mi Gente.

== Albums ==
- Temporary Insanity - Bitchez Never Learn, 1993
- From The Barrio With Love, 1994
- Playerz 4 Life - Major Game, 1995
- Temporary Insanity - Woke Up Hatin' Tha World, 1995
- Barrio Love, 1996
- Los Traficantes - Matan Mi Gente, 1998
- Gang Stories - The Darkroom Uncensored, 1998
- Apocalypse Brown, 1998
- Los Traficantes - No Pararemos Hasta La Muerte, 1999
- From The Barrio With Love, 1999 (re-release)
- Return Of The Living Vets, 1999
- Connected - Felony Consequences, 1999
- Homicide Kings, 2000
- Men Of Honor, 2001
- Family Reunion, 2005
- Northern Cali Finest, 2006
- Last Vets standing, 2007
- Connectionz, 2008
- Los Traficantes - Conecta Del Norte, 2008
- From The Barrio With Hate, 2009
- Norcal Narcotics, 2010
