= Hip Hop Locos =

Studio album by A Lighter Shade of Brown
- Released: 1992
- Recorded: 1992
- Studios: Paramount (Hollywood, CA); Image (Hollywood, CA); 38 Fresh (Hollywood, CA); Ameraycan (North Hollywood, CA)
- Genre: Hip hop
- Length: 42:09
- Label: Pump
- Producers: Angelo "Stone tha Lunatic" Trotter IV; DJ Romeo; DTTX; Eddie "Coze tha Grinch" Goodman; Jason Roberts; Jesse "Tootie" Lars; K.T.; Stan "The Guitar Man" Jones

A Lighter Shade of Brown chronology
Brown & Proud (1990)	Hip Hop Locos (1992)	Layin' in the Cut (1994)

Singles from Hip Hop Locos
- 1. "Spill the Rhyme" Released: 1992; 2. "Homies" Released: September 29, 1992; 3. "Check it Out" Released: 1993

Hip Hop Locos is the second studio album by A Lighter Shade of Brown. It was released in 1992 through Pump Records with distribution via Quality Records.

Hip Hop Locos was not a success, peaking at No. 87 on the Top R&B/Hip-Hop Albums. "Homies" made it to No. 57 on the Billboard Hot 100 and No. 13 on the Hot Rap Singles. ""Interrogated Cause I'm Brown" was also released as a single. The duo supported the album with a North American tour.

== Production ==
The recording sessions took place at Paramount Recording Studios, at Image Recorders, at 38 Fresh, and at Ameraycan Studios in Hollywood. The album was produced by Angelo "Stone tha Lunatic" Trotter IV, DJ Romeo, Eddie "Coze tha Grinch" Goodman, Jason Roberts, Jesse "Tootie" Lars, K.T., Stan "The Guitar Man" Jones and DTTX. Fabian Alfaro, who appeared on the debut, left A Lighter Shade of Brown before the recording sessions. The duo somewhat moved away from the Latin music sounds of Brown & Proud.

== Critical reception ==
Professional ratings
Review scores
Source	Rating
AllMusic	3/5 stars
Los Angeles Times	3/4 stars

The Washington Post deemed the album "considerably stronger in both beats and lyrics" than the debut. The San Antonio Express-News considered it "a satisfying mix of Latino pride, social consciousness and plain fun." The Los Angeles Times noted that "the production values ... are much improved, with crisper beats and more riveting raps."

== Track listing ==
1. "Intro" - 0:23
2. "Hip Hop Locos" - 3:30
3. "A Young Vato" - 3:47
4. "Spill the Rhyme" - 3:57
5. "Viva Zapata" - 2:05
6. "Check It Out" - 3:45
7. "Raize Up" - 4:05
8. "Alla en el Rancho Grande" - 0:22
9. "The Huggy Boy Show" - 0:40
10. "Homies" - 3:31
11. "Low Rider Madness" - 3:27
12. "Brownies" - 3:37
13. "Interrogated Cause I'm Brown, Pt. 1 & 2" (featuring A.L.T., Aztlan Nation, KAOS, Pee Bee, Street Mentality) - 5:16
14. "Spill the Wine" (DJ Muggs Remix) - 3:46

Sample credits

- "Check It Out"
  - "Plantation Inn" by the Mar-Keys
  - "Terminator X Speaks with His Hands" by Public Enemy
  - "Caught, Can We Get a Witness?" by Public Enemy
- "Homies"
  - "The Tracks of My Tears" by the Miracles
- "Brownies"
  - "UFO" by ESG

== Charts ==
Chart (1992)	Peak position
Australian Albums (ARIA)	200
US Top R&B/Hip-Hop Albums (Billboard)	87
