= The Son of Norma =

Studio album by SPM
- Released: September 30, 2014
- Genre: Gangsta rap; chopped and screwed
- Length: 2:31:32
- Label: Dope House Records
- Producer: Arthur Coy Jr. (exec.); Jaime Ortiz; Happy Perez; Shadow Ramirez

SPM chronology
The Last Chair Violinist (2008)	The Son of Norma (2014)

The Son of Norma is the eleventh solo studio album by American rapper SPM, and his fourth album release since the start of his 45-year incarceration in 2002. This 32-track double disc was recorded from prison and released on September 30, 2014, via Dope House Records. The second CD (tracks from 18 to 32) were chopped and screwed by DJ Rapid Ric.

The album peaked at number 61 on the US Billboard 200 chart.

== Track listing ==
No.	Title	Length
1.	"S.P. vs. K-Luv (Battlerap)" (featuring K-Luv)	4:51
2.	"People"	4:26
3.	"Hustla World"	4:38
4.	"Chiefin"	3:23
5.	"Twenty-Eight" (featuring Carolyn Rodriguez)	4:53
6.	"The River" (featuring Ayana Mack)	3:31
7.	"And They Said"	4:47
8.	"Frustration"	4:41
9.	"Till They Come" (featuring Carolyn Rodriguez & Laura Gonzalez)	4:42
10.	"The S.O.N." (featuring Karen Goh)	4:39
11.	"Don't Go Away" (featuring Russell Lee)	3:31
12.	"The Poor Kids" (featuring Ayana Mack)	4:40
13.	"My Homegirl" (featuring Russell Lee)	3:52
14.	"To the Flame" (featuring Carolyn Rodriguez)	4:41
15.	"If It Were You" (featuring Jaime "Pain" Ortiz)	4:13
16.	"Addicted to Storms"	4:06
17.	"Angels" (featuring Carolyn Rodriguez, Fred DB & Milton Bradley)	4:34
18.	"Always So High"	5:38
19.	"My Hoodie"	5:41
20.	"For My Hood"	3:59
21.	"Pure and Uncut" (featuring Carolyn Rodriguez)	6:25
22.	"You Wouldn't Listen" (featuring Ayana Mack)	4:21
23.	"Even From a Prison"	5:47
24.	"Who Would Know"	5:20
25.	"On Everything" (featuring Carolyn Rodriguez)	5:47
26.	"The Son Shines"	5:21
27.	"Hydro Buzz" (featuring Russell Lee)	4:09
28.	"You Can Make It" (featuring Ayana Mack)	5:35
29.	"Come Back Home"	4:31
30.	"We Know the Price" (featuring Carolyn Rodriguez)	5:17
31.	"No Love for No One" (featuring Jaime "Pain" Ortiz)	5:03
32.	"Dead or in Prison"	4:28
Total length:		2:31:32

== Chart history ==
Chart (2014)	Peak position
US Billboard 200	61
US Top R&B/Hip-Hop Albums (Billboard)	111
US Top Rap Albums (Billboard)	6
US Independent Albums (Billboard)	9
