= Time Is Money (SPM album) =

Studio album by SPM
- Released: December 12, 2000
- Studio: Digital Services Studio A
- Genres: Chicano rap; gangsta rap
- Length: 1:10:37
- Labels: Dope House; Universal
- Producers: Arthur Coy Jr. (exec.); South Park Mexican (also exec.); Happy Perez; 2Tone; Jaime Ortiz; Sammy Huen; Shadow Ramirez; Hotan Kheyrandish; Freestyle; Mikey

SPM chronology
The 3rd Wish: To Rock the World (1999)	Time Is Money (2000)	Never Change (2001)

Professional ratings
Review scores
Source	Rating
AllMusic	3/5 stars

Time Is Money is the sixth solo studio album by American rapper SPM. It was released on December 12, 2000, via Dope House Records and Universal Records. The album peaked at number 170 on the Billboard 200 and number 49 on the Top R&B/Hip-Hop Albums charts.

== Track listing ==
No.	Title	Producer(s)	Length
1.	"Hillwood Hustlaz II"	Freestyle	4:00
2.	"Oh My My" (featuring Baby Beesh)	Happy Perez	3:54
3.	"Twice Last Night" (featuring Baby Beesh)	SPM	4:09
4.	"Ooh Wee" (featuring Baby Beesh)	Shadow Ramirez	4:13
5.	"Boys on da Cut" (featuring Ayana)	Shadow Ramirez	4:34
6.	"Medicine"	SPM	5:02
7.	"He's a Bird, He's a Plane" (featuring Ayana)	Jaime "Pain" Ortiz	5:00
8.	"Throw Away Gats" (featuring Ayana & Low-G)	Happy Perez	4:44
9.	"My Feria" (featuring Baby Beesh, Kumbia Kings & Low-G)	Hotan Kheyrandish	4:04
10.	"Burn Us Alive" (featuring Grimm, Happy Perez & Kumbia Kings)	Happy Perez	3:20
11.	"Somethin' I Would Do" (featuring Baby Beesh & Grimm)	Sammy "Grimm" Huen	3:50
12.	"You Know My Name" (Remix) (featuring Ayana)	2Tone	5:54
13.	"Anything Goes" (featuring Baby Beesh & Grimm)	Jaime "Pain" Ortiz	5:00
14.	"Country Life" (featuring E.S.G.)	Mikey	4:33
15.	"Don't Let 'Em Fool Ya" (featuring Baby Beesh, Grimm, Low-G & Rasheed)	Sammy "Grimm" Huen	3:57
16.	"Time Is Money" (featuring 2Tone, Gary L. Moon & Shadow Ramirez)	2Tone	4:39
Total length:			1:10:37

== Personnel ==
- Carlos Coy – executive producer, mixing, arrangements
- Arthur Coy Jr. – executive producer
- Randy "Shadow" Ramirez – engineering, mixing, A&R, arrangements
- James Hoover – engineering, mixing, arrangements
- C-Los Varela – assistant engineer
- Alex "Lobo" Hernandez – A&R, art direction
- "Big Bert" Treviño – mixing, arrangements
- Shawn Brauch of Pen & Pixel – cover design and photography

== Chart history ==
Chart (2000)	Peak position
US Billboard 200	170
US Top R&B/Hip-Hop Albums (Billboard)	49
