= Brown & Proud =

Studio album by A Lighter Shade of Brown
- Released: October 30, 1990
- Recorded: 1990
- Studio: Paramount Recording Studios (Hollywood, California); Beach Recording Studios (Redondo Beach, California); Trax Recording Studio (Hollywood, California); Image Recorders (Hollywood, California)
- Genre: Hip hop
- Length: 37:57
- Label: Pump
- Producer: Jammin' James Carter (also exec.); DJ Romeo (also exec.); Fabe Love; DJ Battlecat; Tony G

A Lighter Shade of Brown chronology
Brown & Proud (1990)	Hip Hop Locos (1992)

Singles from Brown & Proud
- 1. "T.J. Nights" Released: 1990; 2. "Latin Active" Released: 1991; 3. "On a Sunday Afternoon" Released: 1991

Professional ratings
Review scores
Source	Rating
AllMusic	4/5 stars

Brown & Proud is the debut studio album by Latin hip hop group A Lighter Shade of Brown. It was released in 1990 through Pump Records with distribution via Quality Records. The recording sessions took place at Paramount Recording Studios, Trax Recording Studio, and Image Recorders, in Hollywood, and at Beach Recording Studios in Redondo Beach. The album was produced by Fabe Love, Jammin' James Carter, D.J. Romeo, D.J. Battlecat, and Tony G. It features guest appearances from Chulo, Huggy Boy, Teardrop, King Ed, and Shiro.

The album peaked at No. 184 on the Billboard 200 and No. 8 on the Heatseekers Albums in the United States. It spawned three singles: "T.J. Nights", "Latin Active" and "On a Sunday Afternoon". The latter two peaked at No. 59 and No. 39, respectively, on the Hot 100.

== Track listing ==
No.	Title	Writer(s)	Producer(s)	Length
1.	"Brown and Proud" (featuring Chulo)	R. Gutierrez; B. Ramirez; D. Aldridge; J. Carter; F. Alfaro; Chulo; L. Troutman; R. Troutman	Fabe Love; Jammin' James Carter; DJ Romeo	3:46
2.	"El Varrio"	R. Gutierrez; B. Ramirez; D. Aldridge; F. Alfaro; A. Pearson	Fabe Love; DJ Romeo	4:13
3.	"Spill the Wine"	R. Gutierrez; B. Ramirez; D. Aldridge; F. Alfaro; C. Miller; H. Scott; M. Dickerson; L. Jordan; H. Brown; L. Levitin; T. Allen	Fabe Love; DJ Romeo	3:06
4.	"Pancho Villa"	R. Gutierrez; J. Carter	Jammin' James Carter	3:54
5.	"Paquito Soul"	R. Gutierrez; B. Ramirez; F. Alfaro; K. Gilliam; D. Lynem; M. Noble; M. McClain; R. Sause	DJ Battlecat	4:01
6.	"La Cucaracha"		Fabe Love; Jammin' James Carter	0:18
7.	"T.J. Nights" (featuring King Ed)	R. Gutierrez; B. Ramirez; J. Carter; F. Alfaro	Fabe Love; Jammin' James Carter; Tony G. (add.)	3:29
8.	"On a Sunday Afternoon" (featuring Huggy Boy)	R. Gutierrez; B. Ramirez; J. Carter; Chulo; B. Stewart; B. Strong; N. Whitfield; Quiet Storm	Jammin' James Carter	3:47
9.	"Bouncin'"	R. Gutierrez; B. Ramirez; D. Aldridge; F. Alfaro; D. Lynem	Fabe Love; DJ Romeo	3:17
10.	"Latin Active" (featuring Teardrop & Shiro)	R. Gutierrez; J. Carter; F. Alfaro; Chulo; L. Ortiz; D. Cash	Fabe Love; Jammin' James Carter	3:31
11.	"T.J. Nights (Club Oh Version)"	R. Gutierrez; B. Ramirez; J. Carter; F. Alfaro		4:50
Total length:				37:57

== Samples ==
- "Bouncin'"
  - "Think (About It)" by Lyn Collins
  - "More Bounce to the Ounce" by Zapp
  - "Boyz-n-the-Hood (Remix)" by Eazy-E
- "On a Sunday Afternoon"
  - "Papa Was Too" by Joe Tex
  - "Groovin'" by the Young Rascals
  - "Crystal Blue Persuasion" by Tommy James and the Shondells
- "Paquito Soul"
  - "Respect" by Aretha Franklin
  - "I Know You Got Soul" by Bobby Byrd
  - "Impeach the President" by the Honey Drippers
- "Spill the Wine"
  - "Spill the Wine" by Eric Burdon & War
- "T.J. Nights"
  - "One of These Nights" by Eagles
  - "Play That Funky Music" by Wild Cherry
- "Latin Active"
  - "I Like What You're Doing to Me" by Young and Company
  - "Radio Activity" by Royal Cash

== Personnel ==
- Robert "ODM" Gutierrez – main artist, sleeve notes
- Bobby "DTTX" Ramirez – main artist, sleeve notes
- Chulo – featured artist (track 1)
- King Ed – featured artist (track 7)
- Huggy Boy – featured artist (track 8)
- Teardrop – featured artist (track 10)
- Shiro – featured artist (track 10)
- The Hou Dog Houston – keyboards, guitar & bass (tracks: 1–6, 8–11), recording
- Stan "The Guitar" Man – guitar & bass (track 7)
- Fabian Alfaro – producer (tracks: 1–3, 6–7, 9–10)
- James Calvin Carter – producer (tracks: 1, 4, 6–8, 10), executive producer
- Dominic Aldridge – producer (tracks: 1–3, 9–10), executive producer
- Kevin Gilliam – producer (track 5)
- Antonio Gonzalez – additional producer (track 7), mixing (track 11)
- Danny Clay Williams – recording
- Geza Gedeon – recording
- Brian Carey – recording
- Jason Roberts – recording
- Cliff Richey Jr. – executive producer, management
- Gino Daniels – design
- Ithaka Darin Pappas – photography*

== Charts ==
Chart (1992)	Peak position
US Billboard 200	184
US Heatseekers Albums (Billboard)	8
