= On a Sunday Afternoon =

1991 single by A Lighter Shade of Brown featuring Shiro Stokes and Huggy Boy

Single by A Lighter Shade of Brown featuring Shiro Stokes and Huggy Boy

from the album Brown & Proud
- B-side: "A Sunday Afternoon Groove"
- Released: 1991
- Genre: Hip hop
- Length: 3:47
- Label: Pump
- Songwriters: Robert Gutierrez; Bobby Ramirez; James Carter; B. Stewart; Barrett Strong; Norman Whitfield; Quiet Storms
- Producer: Jammin' James Carter

A Lighter Shade of Brown singles chronology
"Latin Active" (1991)	"On a Sunday Afternoon" (1991)	"Spill the Rhyme" (1992)

Shiro Stokes singles chronology
"Latin Active" (1991)	"On a Sunday Afternoon" (1991)

Music video
- "On a Sunday Afternoon" on YouTube

"On a Sunday Afternoon" is a song by American hip hop duo A Lighter Shade of Brown and the second single from their debut studio album, Brown & Proud (1990). Featuring singer Shiro Stokes and radio disc jockey Huggy Boy, it was produced by Jammin' James Carter. It is the group's most successful song, peaking at number 39 on the US Billboard Hot 100 and reaching number one in New Zealand for two weeks; it is certified gold in the latter country.

== Samples ==
The song contains samples of "Groovin'" by the Rascals, "Crystal Blue Persuasion" by Tommy James and the Shondells, "Papa Was Too" by Joe Tex and "La-La (Means I Love You)" by the Delfonics.

== Music video ==
The music video was shot at Legg Lake Park in the Whittier Narrows Recreation Area. It sees the duo rapping and cruising around in the parking lot.

== Track listings ==
US cassette single; UK and Australian CD single

1. "On a Sunday Afternoon" (radio mix) – 3:44
2. "A Sunday Afternoon Groove" – 3:47

UK 7-inch single

A. "On a Sunday Afternoon" (radio mix) – 3:24
B. "Brown & Proud" (featuring Chulo) – 3:45

UK 12-inch single

A1. "On a Sunday Afternoon" (Ozone mix) – 3:45
B1. "On a Sunday Afternoon" (radio mix) – 3:24
B2. "Brown & Proud" (featuring Chulo) – 3:45

== Charts ==
=== Weekly charts ===
Chart (1992)	Peak position
Australia (ARIA)	162
Netherlands (Single Top 100)	49
New Zealand (Recorded Music NZ)	1
US Billboard Hot 100	39

=== Year-end charts ===
Chart (1992)	Position
New Zealand (Recorded Music NZ)	11

== Certifications ==
Region	Certification	Certified units/sales
New Zealand (RMNZ)	Gold	5,000^{*}
^{*} Sales figures based on certification alone.

== Release history ==
Region	Date	Format(s)	Label(s)	Ref.
United States	1991	Cassette	Pump	
United Kingdom	July 6, 1992	7-inch vinyl; 12-inch vinyl; CD	Pump	
