= Associated Recording Studios =

Defunct independent New York recording studio

Associated Recording Studios, familiarly known as Associated, was based in the music district of New York City from 1946 to 1985, near the famous Brill Building. As New York's major independent recording studio for almost 40 years, Associated was used by all types of musicians, singers, songwriters, producers and publishers in New York's thriving music industry.

== Location and ownership ==
First located on Broadway, Associated moved a few blocks to a larger space in 1961 at 723 7th Avenue, near 48th Street, at the northern end of Times Square. Associated was owned and operated by Nathan “Nat” Schnapf and Paul Friedberger, who met while working as radar technicians at Western Electric during World War II.

== Genres and business model ==
As a major independent studio, Associated was available to anyone with a recording need. It was used by talent from the entire range of New York's music industry: opera, jazz, broadway, pop, blues, and even country. Beyond pure entertainment, the studio recorded political ads, advertising jingles, comedy albums – just about anything; including a rare field recording of a speech by Albert Einstein.

With the ascendency of Rock and Roll in the 1950s and 1960s, Associated's staple business became making “demo” records for up and coming singers and bands, and for New York's large community of songwriters, publishers and producers seeking to strike it rich with a hit song. Much of the material covered by the artists of the 1950s and 1960s was written by the many great songwriters of the day. These songwriters acted independently of the major record labels, often working for one of the large number of publishing companies inhabiting the Brill Building and surrounding area. Taking the idea for a song, the writers/publishers/producers would come to Associated to cut a demo, often adapting and improvising along the way, which would then be used to try to entice a known artist to cover the song. In most instances, once an act's success was established it would sign with a record label and typically, would thereafter use the label's private studio. Accordingly, making recordings for established artists was only a small portion Associated's business. Nonetheless, many major “hits” where recorded there. Some by up and coming artists who went on to long, successful careers; others by “one hit wonders.” Associated was never involved in mass production of records or tapes. In most cases the end product of a recording session was a session tape and a record made using a lathe to cut a groove on a lacquer-covered aluminum disk.

While working there as an engineer in 1966, songwriter Jerry Samuels conceived and recorded the novelty hit single, "They're Coming To Take Me Away", which was released by Warner Brothers Records with the artist listed as Napoleon XIV.

== Additional services ==
In addition to providing the recording space and equipment, Associated provided engineers and, if requested, hired studio musicians, many of which were enormously talented. It maintained a large assortment of standard and exotic instruments – from penny whistles to Hammond organs, and its engineers were always willing to experiment with new recording techniques to get that new sound many artists were looking for.

== Closure ==
The 1970s and 1980s brought major changes to the recording industry which impacted Associated business. During this time, recording technology was changing and developing quickly, and more and more recording artists began writing their own material, cutting the role of independent songwriters. Ultimately, these factors led the Associated's owners to shut down as they neared retirement age.
