= Latin Active =

1991 single by A Lighter Shade of Brown featuring Shiro Stokes and Teardrop

Single by A Lighter Shade of Brown featuring Shiro Stokes and Teardrop

from the album Brown & Proud
- Released: 1991
- Recorded: 1990
- Genre: Hip hop
- Length: 3:31
- Label: Pump
- Songwriters: Robert Gutierrez; Bobby Ramirez; James Carter; Fabian Alfaro; Chulo; Luis Ortiz; Darryl Cash
- Producers: Fabe Love; Jammin' James Carter

A Lighter Shade of Brown singles chronology
"T.J. Nights" (1990)	"Latin Active" (1991)	"On a Sunday Afternoon" (1991)

Shiro Stokes singles chronology
"Latin Active" (1991)	"On a Sunday Afternoon" (1991)

Music video
- "Latin Active" on YouTube

"Latin Active" is a song by American hip hop duo A Lighter Shade of Brown and was released in 1991 by label Pump as the lead single from their debut studio album, Brown & Proud (1990). It features singer Shiro Stokes and rapper Teardrop, and was produced by Fabe Love and Jammin' James Carter. The song peaked at numbers 59 and 77 on the US Billboard Hot 100 and Cash Box Top 100 charts.

== Background and content ==
Teardrop rhymes in both English and Spanish in the song. She declares herself as Chicana in the original version, but when the song was released as a single the lyric was substituted with "Latina".

== Charts ==
Chart (1991)	Peak position
US Billboard Hot 100	59
US Cash Box Top 100	77
