= Conejo (rapper) =

American rapper (born 1974)

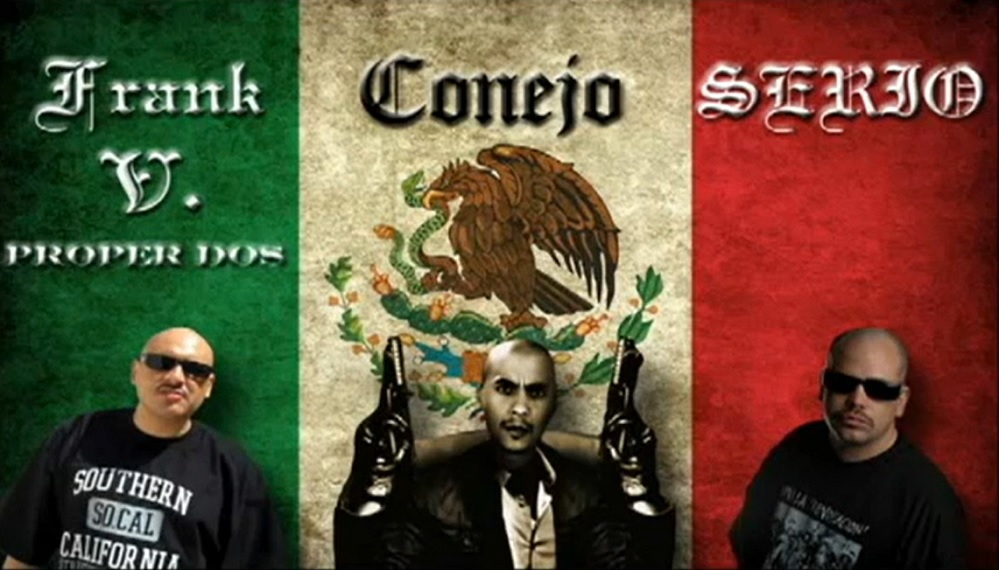
- Conejo with Frank V. & Serio in 2012

Background information
- Origin: Los Angeles, California, U.S.
- Genre: Chicano rap
- Occupations: Rapper; actor
- Years active: 1999–present
- Label: Sinister Kingdom Music

Jose Martin (born October 9, 1974), known as Conejo, is a rapper based in Los Angeles, California, who has worked in various hip-hop genres since the late 1980s. Much of his work exhibits native fluency in English and Spanish. He is a well-known contributor to the Chicano rap genre, Gangster Rap genre and frequent collaborator with Proper Dos.

Conejo was the main antagonist of the film The Tax Collector where he plays, Conejo, an enforcer for an unspecified Mexican drug cartel.

== Early life ==
Martin is Mexican with US citizenship through birth. His parents are originally from the state of Jalisco, Mexico. He grew up in Los Angeles, California in the 'West Adams' neighborhood. One of his childhood friends is David Ayer, the writer of Training Day, who enlisted for a major movie role in late 2020

== Fugitive ==
Conejo was a fugitive for 14 years due to a murder warrant that was later litigated in favor of the rapper. While on the run, the rapper released various mixtapes to his hardcore rap fanbase, In 2012, Chicano rapper Serio released “Don’t Hate Me Cause I’m Mexican.” which featured Conejo and Proper Dos, one of the only collaborations Conejo made while on the run. Accruing hundreds of thousands of monthly streams through various social media channels. In 2016, the rapper was extradited from Mexico to the United States.

== Current work ==
Since 2018, Conejo has returned to the public through multiple media projects. He has collaborated with various high-profile rappers, like Proper Dos and Cypress Hill, publishing at minimum one full album per year since his days as a fugitive. A somewhat comprehensive list of his discography has been described and lists the total number of albums as higher than 30, but because of the rapper's unconventional distribution, the number of tracks and albums linked to him may be much higher.

For distribution, the rapper now works with Sony, with one of his more well-known albums being Agenda 32. As mentioned above, his work in 'The Tax Collector' led to his role as 'Oscar' in FX's 'Deputy' series.

While Conejo's status a fugitive led to a great deal of his work having popularity, this was often not promoted in conventional digital platforms. Instead, much of the work can be found in social media outlets. Only recently, in the 5 years after his acquittal, Conejo has enjoyed more conventional means of communication with his fanbase, appearing in publications based in the US west coast, such as Daily Chela, Phoenix New Times and Nuestra Intel.

== Tours and shows ==
- Nightmare Before Xmas 2019
- Nightmare Before Xmas 2021
- Nightmare Before Xmas 2022
- Nightmare Before Xmas 2023

In Southern California, the rapper has held a near Christmas time themed show called 'Nightmare before Xmas'. Other recognized acts, like Young Drummer Boy, performed as well in the 2019 show.

Due to the measures taking during Covid's early phase, 2020's show was essentially skipped, but 2021 and 2022 went on as scheduled. For 2023, said show is set to take place on Dec. 23, 2023.
