= Brownside =

American hip-hop group

Background information
- Origin: South Los Angeles, California
- Genres: Hip hop, Gangsta rap, Chicano rap
- Years active: 1993–present
- Labels: East Town Records (current); Ruthless Records; Relativity Records; Fellon Records; Triple X Records; PR Records
- Members: Wicked; Klever; Trouble
- Past members: Danger (deceased); Toker (deceased); Fello (deceased)
- Website: brownside13.com

Brownside is an American hip-hop group from South Central Los Angeles organized by American rapper Eazy-E. The original members of the group consisted of Toker, Fello, Wicked and Danger, with Trouble and Klever joining the group later on. Klever is the also the baby brother of Toker. Originally, Eazy-E had signed Brownside to Ruthless Records in hope to create a Chicano rap version of his former group N.W.A.

Toker described the group as "gangsters trying to be rappers, rather than rappers trying to be gangsters."

Three members of the group have died: Fello, Toker and Danger.

== History ==
=== Beginnings of the group ===
Toker was introduced to the music attorney Bob Liebermen. Bob had heard a demo cassette of theirs, recorded by Toker, that had contained a couple of tracks, including "Gang Related". Libermen then contacted Eazy-E. Toker and Eazy-E meet each other through Bob and began bonding. Eazy-E then recruited Toker and Wicked to the label They were signed to Ruthless Records and officially became part of their roster in 1994. Eazy-E's vision on the group was to make the group a Chicano rap version of N.W.A that could highlight Mexican-American street life, rivalries, and resilience without weakening its rawness. Eazy-E saw a chance to bridge the gap between African American and Latino gang organizations. He also sought to raise the profile of Ruthless Records as a rap label.

Ruthless Records released their debut single "Gang Related", which was the only release on the label issued before the death of Eazy-E. They also had an early recording with Eazy-E in 1994 entitled "Eastside Drama" which was not released at the time.

=== After Eazy-E's death ===
The demise of Eazy-E led to instability at Ruthless Records, which made the group depart from the label over ongoing management disputes. Legal disputes began in April 1995 over artist royalty payments; Jerry Heller fought for control of the label with Eazy-E's widow Tomica Wright. Brownside then began working with Rumble Records, and their debut album was released through East Town Records. Recording for the album began at G-Son Studios with Tony G as a producer. It was released on July the 29th, 1997 and was their first release after their departure from Ruthless Records and Eazy-E's death. The album included some G-funk characteristics along with their Chicano rap theme/style. Brownside at the time was positioned as a N.W.A inspired group.

The album's release boosted the group from its street sound in the Chicano rap subgenre, helped by Ruthless's distribution through Relativity Records. Commercial success remained quiet compared to other acts.

=== Payback ===
Brownside released their 2nd album Payback in 1999. Payback continued their Chicano rap theme. The album received minimal distribution because of limited label backing. Payback sustained visibility through appearances on compilations and mixtapes, helping to keep their audience.

During the early 2000s Ruthless Records faced reduced marketing and distribution budgets, which led Brownside to begin promoting and marketing themselves in Southern California and Mexican American communities.

=== The Take Over and later events ===
After the 1990s, Brownside released their 3rd album The Take Over which was released in 2000. The group began losing their output which in a result had become less frequent; members also began pursuing independent careers. Toker and Wicked at the time were focusing on collaborations and independent singles with Toker appearing on the track "G-Spot Da Clique" in 1998 and "Everybody Knows" on the Good Fellas soundtrack, while Wicked released his debut studio album Mr. Bald & Brown in 1999 and his 2nd in 2002, and his 3rd studio album in 2006 which also featured an appearance from Toker. They began working on their solo careers and self-produced work outside major labels; this was influenced by their departure in 1995 from Ruthless Records and Eazy-E's death including Dangers. The group ended up releasing a 4th album in 2008 titled Trece Razones (13 Reasons). While Toker was in jail, he meet Trouble and invited him to join Brownside.

Brownside began working on their fifth album, a double-disc called Bangin Story'z that was released on May 27, 2016. Another member was added to the group during the making of Bangin' Story'z: Klever, Toker's younger brother.

Official output started losing momentum during the 2010s because of rising personal and outer pressures, including gang-related crimes and legal entanglements. Toker was faced with incarceration after being linked to illegal activities caused by a video depicting gun violence which led to his arrest in 2015 by the LAPD. Wicked kept a lower visibility, doing selected features and sustained group commitments. This aligned with industry shifts away from gangsta rap's commercial peak.

The group's effective disbandment was made clear after Toker's murder on October 10, 2018, in Rosarito, Baja California, where he was shot 30 times by people posing as police, reportedly over debts tied to cartel connections. This tragedy, following a pattern of violence that claimed Danger earlier, left Brownside's future in doubt, with Wicked's subsequent solo output signaling no immediate reformation.

== Members of the group ==
- Gilbert "Toker" Izquierdo was the first member of the group, he was born on October 20, 1966, and died October 10, 2018, due to gunshot wounds inside of Rosarito, Mexico. He helped the group get signed to Ruthless Records and made a close connection to Eazy-E personally. Toker helped the group get its recognition and was one of the main voices behind the tracks, Toker also produced their first single Gang Related.
- "Fello" was the brother of Toker who was initially going to be in the group and was a key associate in their pre-recording phase. Fello died in 1992 in San Bernardino.
- Pierre "Wicked" Lamas was born in South Central Los Angeles, California. He was alongside Toker and Danger when Brownside was being created, acting as a co-founder. Wicked contributed to the group by writing lyrics and providing lyrical assistance for demos including on Eastside Drama. Wicked began on his solo career during the late 1990s with his debut album Mr. Bald & Brown, released in 1999.
- Carlos "Danger" Martinez was one of the founders of the group. He was born on October the 4th, 1971 and died in a drive-by shooting on January 1, 1996. He contributed to their early recordings.
- Jose Philip "Trouble" Aguirre held a short-term role in Brownsides lineup.

== Discography ==
- Eastside Drama (1997)
- Payback (1999)
- The Take Over (2006)
- Trece Razones (13 Reasons) (2008)
- Bangin Story'z (2016)
