= Dick Hugg =

American disc jockey

Dick 'Huggy Boy' Hugg
- Born: Richard James Hugg; June 9, 1928; Canton, Ohio
- Died: August 30, 2006 (aged 78); Long Beach, California
- Occupation: disc jockey
- Years active: 1950s–2006

Richard James "Dick" Hugg (also known as "Huggy Boy") (June 9, 1928 – August 30, 2006) was a radio disc jockey in Los Angeles, California.

== Rock and Roll ==
Hugg was the first white disc jockey to broadcast (on station KRKD) from the front window of John Dolphin's popular all-night record store, Dolphin's of Hollywood, at the corner of Central and Vernon Avenues. He also co-produced several artists, such as vocalist Jesse Belvin and saxophonist Joe Houston, on Dolphin's various record labels, including Cash and Money. With his own record label, Caddy Records, Hugg recorded local favorites Jim Balcom, Jeanette Baker, Chuck Higgins and Johnny Flamingo. Hugg later promoted bands like The Jaguars, the Village Callers, Thee Midniters and The Champs; these groups were part of what was later known as the Chicano rock movement.

Though originally an R&B disc jockey, Hugg gradually aimed his radio and television shows at Los Angeles' burgeoning Latino population and featured almost every young Chicano group coming out of East Los Angeles, the San Gabriel Valley, the Pomona Valley, and the San Fernando Valley. He promoted dances and shows in the barrio and was important to the growth of the city's so-called Eastside Sound. He also brought to East Los Angeles groups such as Them, Sonny and Cher, The Righteous Brothers and Dusty Springfield, acts that may otherwise have not been accessible to Mexican-American audiences.

Hugg was on KRKD, 1951–55; KWKW, 1954; KALI; KGFJ, 1955; KBLA, 1965; KRKD, 1965–66; KRTH, 1975; XPRS, 1981–82; KRLA, 1983–98; KRTH, 1998–2002. He hosted an oldies show on KRLA and for a time, a dance program, "The Huggie Boy Show", which aired weekly on KWHY-TV channel 22. His popularity continued to increase long after the show went off the air.

Hugg was one of the masters of ceremonies for the fourteenth Cavalcade of Jazz concerts being produced by Leon Hefflin Sr. held at that year at the Shrine Auditorium on August 3, 1958. The last Cavalcade of Jazz concert was a tribute to the city's most prominent r&b disc jockeys - Charles Trammel, Hunter Hancock and Jim Randolph teamed up with Hugg. Lionel Hampton, Big Jay McNeely, Dinah Washington, Betty Carter, Billy Eckstine, Jimmy Witherspoon, Louis Jordan, Nat "King" Cole, Louis Armstrong, Count Basie, Sam Cooke were just a few of the numerous artists that performed over the years.

== Personal life ==
Hugg was married to Emily Hugg for 25 years and had three girls: Darlene, Lisa, and Tiffany. He was later in a relationship for 17 years with Sandy Flores with whom he had a son, Richard Hugg Jr. He had seven grandchildren. Dick Hugg died of cardiac arrest on August 30, 2006, at age 78. He is interred at Rose Hills Memorial Park in Whittier, California.

== In popular culture ==
Hugg is referenced in Season 2, Episode 14 of The Rockford Files, "The Hammer of C Block." Isaac Hayes's character, Gandolph Fitch, while searching for a radio station says, "Nobody's playing music anymore? Where's Huggy Boy or Hunter Hancock?"

At the beginning of the 1987 comedy Born in East L.A., Hugg can be heard doing a radio aircheck.

He is also featured in the introduction of the music video for On a Sunday Afternoon by the Chicano rap group Lighter Shade of Brown.

In the '80s, Hugg had frequently hosted live shows at the former Red Mill Theatre in East Los Angeles, then known as the Boulevard Theatre, which had been operating as a movie house showing Spanish language films and Spanish-dubbed or subtitled versions of English-language films. In 2004, while the theatre had been converted into a church, the name "Boulevard" on the vertical blade marquee were replaced with the words "Huggy Boy" in tribute to him. The theatre continues as a church today, and the "Huggy Boy" marquee still remains.
