= A Lighter Shade of Brown (album) =

Lighter Shade of Brown

Studio album by A Lighter Shade of Brown
- Released: November 18, 1997
- Recorded: 1997
- Genre: Hip hop
- Length: 42:44
- Label: Greenside Records; Thump Records
- Producer: Andy Herrara (exec.); Antonio Mendoza (exec.); Jammin' James Carter; Lev Berlak; Ali Malek

A Lighter Shade of Brown chronology
Layin' in the Cut (1994)	Lighter Shade of Brown (1997)	If You Could See Inside Me (1999)

Professional ratings
Review scores
Source	Rating
AllMusic	2.5/5 stars

Lighter Shade of Brown is the fourth studio album by A Lighter Shade of Brown. It was released on November 18, 1997 through Greenside/Thump Records. Production was handled by Ali Malek, Jammin' James Carter and Lev Berlak, with Andy Herrara and Antonio Mendoza as executive producers. It features guest appearances from Shiro, D'wayne Wiggins, Rappin' 4-Tay and Teardrop.

== Track listing ==
1. "Welcome to Club Fed"- 1:00
2. "Club Fed"- 3:57
3. "Street Life"- 4:17
4. "Interlude"- 1:48
5. "Do U Wanna Ride (Hey Buddy Hey Buddy)"- 3:34
6. "It's on Tonight"- 3:24
7. "They Can't Stand It"- 4:02 (featuring Shiro and Teardrop)
8. "Whatever You Want"- 4:00 (featuring Tony! Toni! Toné!)
9. "Bounce"- 4:09
10. "So What You Say"- 3:48
11. "Klsob Request Line"- 0:53
12. "Can't Hold Back"- 4:16 (featuring Shiro)
13. "World Famous"- 3:36 (featuring Rappin' 4-Tay)
