= South Park Mexican =

American rapper (born 1970)

- Born: Carlos Coy; October 5, 1970 (age 56); Houston, Texas, U.S.
- Genres: Hip hop; Southern hip hop; gangsta rap; chopped and screwed; Chicano rap
- Occupations: Rapper; lyricist
- Instrument: Vocals
- Years active: 1994–present
- Labels: Dope House; Universal
- Criminal information
- Status: Inmate, TDCJ 01110642 in Ramsey Unit; eligible for parole on January 13, 2028; projected release date April 8, 2047
- Conviction: Sexual assault (May 18, 2002)
- Penalty: 45 years imprisonment

Carlos Coy (born October 5, 1970), known professionally as SPM (an initialism for South Park Mexican), is an American rapper and convicted sex offender. His stage name was incorporated from his Mexican heritage and the South Park neighborhood in Houston, Texas, where he was raised.

Growing up into a life of crime in the mid-1980s, he later started his rap career in 1994. One year later, in 1995, he and his older brother co-founded independent music label, Dope House Records, and released his debut studio album, Hillwood, that March.

On May 18, 2002, Coy was convicted of aggravated sexual assault of a child, sentenced to 45 years in prison, and ordered to pay a $10,000 fine. He is currently serving his sentence at the Ramsey Unit near Rosharon, Texas; his projected release date is April 8, 2047. While incarcerated, he has continued to record music.

== Early life ==
Carlos Coy was born on October 5, 1970, in Houston, Texas. His father was a former United States Marine from Falfurrias. Coy's mother dropped out of high school to marry his father; they divorced in 1974.

His mother had worked full-time to support the family and was unable to apply for welfare. Because of this, Coy's older sister, a hairdresser, described herself as his "mother and sister", having to take care of him on most occasions. Coy emotionally felt disturbed by the aftermath of his father's separation from his mother and absence from the family. Taking the divorce of his parents hard, he grew into trouble.

He attended various elementary schools, before entering the music magnet program at Welch Middle School, learning how to play the piano before transitioning to the violin. His family moved from Southeast Houston to South Park, where he attended Woodson Middle School. He later started skateboarding and breakdancing. At the age of 10, he was arrested for arson after he accidentally burned down the living room of the house of his friend's parents as a result of him smoking a cigarette mixed with marijuana.

At the age of 13, he became a crack cocaine dealer. He attended Milby High School until he was expelled in 1987 while in the ninth grade following a physical altercation with a female student, which provoked him to assault her. He was sent to an alternative school, before dropping out soon after. Coy later obtained a GED and enrolled in San Jacinto Junior College for a business associate degree, but failed his classes. He did not have enough money to pay off his student loans and dropped out of San Jacinto, returning to Houston's South Park neighborhood. In a 1999 interview with the Houston Press, he reminisced on being expelled from Milby, saying "One more year in high school and I would’ve went to jail for fucking all those little young bitches."

His older brother helped him find a legitimate job, working at a chemical plant for minimum wage, but after experiencing skin problems, including rash development, he was fired. Unemployed again, he worked as a door-to-door perfume salesman, but did not receive the money he expected. He continued dealing drugs. In 1992, he was invaded by robbers who held him at gunpoint in exchange for cash, jewelry and drugs. That same year, he lost a close friend to gun violence. He relocated to his mother's trailer home for safety and asked God for a sign.

== Career ==
Coy's interest in music resurfaced after watching a television commercial about rap. He initially began his career as a Christian rapper. After performing a verse at a freestyle event, a competitor who performed afterwards rapped that he would "kill [Coy's] mama and put her body in the trunk of his car. Everybody at the party cheered him." This spurred his transition to secular rapping.

In 1994, Coy bought cassette tapes and resumed rapping. He began recording songs under the alias South Park Mexican (SPM for short), an ode to his Mexican heritage and his origins in Houston's South Park. In 1995, Coy and his older brother co-founded their own record label, Dope House Records. He released his debut album, Hillwood, locally in March 1995. He sold the album from the trunk of his car at flea markets and car shows for $5 each. Its title references the Houston neighborhood of the same name. He caught the attention of Southwest Wholesales, an independent music distributor in farwide Harris County. Throughout the summer of 1997, he started working on his second studio album, Hustle Town, which was released on March 3, 1998. The album became a hit in the Houston underground rap scene. It was supported by its single, "Mary-Go-Round".

On December 22, 1998, Coy released his third album, Power Moves: The Table, which garnered mainstream attention. On November 23, 1999, he released his fourth album, The 3rd Wish: To Rock the World; its lead single, "High So High" charted at number fifty on the Billboard Hot Rap Tracks chart. Its follow-up single, "Wiggy", did not match the same success as "High So High".

In February 2000, he signed Dope House to a distribution deal with Universal Records, a now-absorbed music division of Universal Music Group. It earned him an advance of $500,000 and national distribution. Universal released two of Coy's studio albums, Time is Money (2000), and Never Change (2001). The compilation, The Purity Album (2000), included the single "You Know My Name", which peaked at number thirty-one on the rap chart. San Antonio Express-News writer Ramiro Burr summarized South Park Mexican's lyrical content in a 2001 profile: "SPM delivers raunchy lyrics about growing up in the barrio and living the party life. But he says he also focuses on working hard and having hope for a better life."

His Universal releases did not gain much mainstream attention; Jason Birchmeier of AllMusic suggested, "Coy's hardcore rapping proved to be too harsh for the masses". He was dropped from Universal after his arrest on child sexual abuse charges. His 2002 album, Reveille Park, a compilation of freestyles, was released by Dope House shortly before Coy's trial for sexual assault began. Dope House also released two more albums recorded by Coy while he was incarcerated, When Devils Strike, released in 2006, debuted at No. 46 on the Billboard 200, and The Last Chair Violinist followed two years later in 2008. Following a six-year hiatus, he released The Son of Norma on September 30, 2014.

== Criminal and civil matters ==
=== 2001–02: Child sexual assault cases ===
On September 25, 2001, Houston police arrested Coy on a charge of aggravated sexual assault of a female child who, at the time, was nine years old. He was released from county jail after posting bail. The incident occurred on a Labor Day weekend, earlier that month. A Harris County jury indicted Coy on December 10, 2001.

Two more charges followed in March 2002 for the sexual assault of two 14-year-old girls in a hotel room in New Caney; Coy was held without bail. Coy's trial began on May 8, 2002, when the mother of the nine-year-old girl testified that her daughter left a sleepover because of abuse.

The next day, the girl, who also claimed to have had insomnia, testified that Coy touched her inappropriately when she was sleeping with her friend, who was Coy's daughter. He then proceeded to perform oral sex on the girl. Driving her back to her mother's house, Coy also complimented her dancing abilities and coerced her to lie to her parents, claiming that her stomach was hurting. He promised to her mother and grandparents that he would plan on building a dance studio to fulfill her dreams. However, after he left, the child explained to the family that he sexually assaulted her. Coy maintains his innocence in this case, claiming that it was an attempt to extort him for money.

On May 18, 2002, following a ten-day trial, the Harris County Courthouse jury found Coy guilty of aggravated sexual assault of a child. He was sentenced to 45 years in prison on May 30 and ordered to pay a $10,000 fine. Coy, whose Texas Department of Criminal Justice number is 01110642, is incarcerated in the Telford Unit in New Boston, TX. His projected release date is April 8, 2047.

There had been persistent messages from online posters calling for his release, but also mixed reception, due to Coy's criminal behavior.

=== 2024: Parole hearing ===
Coy's first parole eligibility hearing began on October 7, 2024. His parole request was later denied on January 13, 2025, his next parole hearing is scheduled for January 2028.

=== 2000–01: Child support lawsuit ===
In July 2000, Houston police officers appeared at the headquarters of Dope House Records with court orders for Coy, involving a lawsuit filed by a 20-year-old female who claimed that, in 1993, he impregnated her when she was 13. Their son was born months later. At the time of the lawsuit, their child was 6 years old. The plaintiff later demanded child support payments from him.

After a DNA paternity test, it was confirmed 99.9% positive that Coy was, in fact, the biological father of the victim's son. He was ordered to pay the victim and their son $28,000 in unpaid child support as well as hospital fees for prenatal and birth expenses.

Following Coy's arrest on charges of aggravated sexual assault in late 2001, the Harris County District Attorney's office announced that the 1993 incident would be pressed as a criminal charge against him.

=== 2005: Lawsuit from victim ===
In February 2005, the aggravated sexual assault victim, now twelve years old that year, was awarded (on behalf of her parents) $25,000 in damages and liability.

== Discography ==
=== Solo albums ===
Title	Release	Peak chart positions			
Title	Release	US	US R&B	US Rap	US Ind
Hillwood	Released: March 9, 1995; Label: Dope House; Format: CD, cassette, download	—	—	—	—
Hustle Town	Released: March 3, 1998; Label: Dope House; Format: CD, cassette, download	—	—	—	—
Power Moves: The Table	Released: December 22, 1998; Label: Dope House; Format: CD, cassette, download	—	—	—	—
The 3rd Wish: To Rock the World	Released: November 23, 1999; Label: Dope House; Format: CD, cassette, download	—	89	—	—
Time Is Money	Released: December 12, 2000; Label: Dope House; Universal; Format: CD, download	170	49	—	—
Never Change	Released: December 4, 2001; Label: Dope House; Universal; Format: CD, cassette, download	168	40	—	—
Reveille Park	Released: May 5, 2002; Label: Dope House; Format: CD, download	149	48	—	8
When Devils Strike	Released: October 3, 2006; Label: Dope House; Format: CD, download	46	19	6	2
The Last Chair Violinist	Released: November 18, 2008; Label: Dope House; Format: CD, download	59	14	5	3
The Son of Norma	Released: September 30, 2014; Label: Dope House; Format: CD, download	61	11	6	9
Forty Eight	Released: October 5, 2018; Label: Dope House; Format: CD, download	-	-	-	-
The Devil's Mansion	Released: October 4, 2019; Label: Dope House; Format: CD, download	-	-	-	-
Telephone Road	Released: November 1, 2020; Label: Dope House; Format: CD, download	-	-	-	-
If Animals Could Talk	Released: December 25, 2025; Label: Dope House; Format: CD, download	-	-	-	-
"—" denotes a recording that did not chart. "x" denotes that chart did not exist at the time.

=== Collaboration albums ===
- Wanted with Lone Star Ridaz (2001)
- 40 Dayz/40 Nightz with Lone Star Ridaz (2002)

=== Compilation albums ===
- Lone Star Ridaz with Happy P (2000)
- The Purity Album (2000)
- Pocos Pero Locos Presents the SPM Hits (2013)

=== Mixtapes ===
- Screwston: The Day Houston Died (2001)
- Screwston Vol. 2: Pink Soda (2001)
- Screwston Vol. 3: Stuck in da Mud (2002)

=== Remix albums ===
- Hillwood & Hustle Town: Screwed & Chopped (2003)
- Power Moves: The Table: Screwed & Chopped (2003)
- Reveille Park: Screwed & Chopped (2003)
- The 3rd Wish to Rock the World: Screwed & Chopped (2003)

=== Soundtrack albums ===
- Latin Throne (1999)
- Latin Throne 2 (2000)

=== Singles ===
Title	Release	Peak chart positions		Album
Title	Release	US R&B	US Rap	Album
"Comin' Up Comin' Down"	1995	—		Hillwood
"Streets on Beats"	1997	—		Hustle Town
"El Jugador"	1998	—		Power Moves: The Table
"High So High"	1999	—	50	The 3rd Wish: To Rock the World
"You Know My Name"	2000	99	31	The Purity Album
"Oh My My"	2000	—		Time Is Money
"I Must Be High"	2001	—		Never Change
"I Need a Sweet"	2002	—		Reveille Park

== Guest appearances ==
Year	Song	Performer(s)	Album
1997	"Warriors"	The Most Hated ft. South Park Mexican	The Most Hated
1999	"June 27"	Yungstar ft. Trey D, Black 1, Lil Flex, Den Den, Demo, Grace, Wood, Solo D, Lil Dave, Papa Rue, Lil Fee, Taylor Made, Ace Deuce, Lil O, Kool Aid, PSK-13, R.W.O., South Park Mexican, Crooks & Madd Hattta	Throwed Yung Playa
2000	"Southside Groovin"	Point Blank ft. PSK-13, Zhayne, Lil Flex, Lil Flea, South Park Mexican & Big T	Bad Newz Travels Fast
2000	"Tex To Cali, Pt. 2"	South Park Mexican & Frost	Shunny Pooh Presents: 3rd Coast's Finest Volume 1
2000	"Nigga Who Dat?"	Woss Ness ft. South Park Mexican & Big Hawk	Bangin' Screw
2000	"Makin' Deals of a Lifetime"	Candyman ft. Lil J, South Park Mexican & Black-N-Mild	Makin' Deals of a Lifetime
2000	"Stack & Fold"	D-Red (of the Botany Boyz) ft. South Park Mexican & B-1	Smokin' & Lean'n 2000
2000	"Deep in the Barrio"	Ace Deuce ft. South Park Mexican	Southern Gutta Butta
2000	"Snitches"	Rasheed ft. South Park Mexican	Let The Games Begin
2000	"Mac God"	Rasheed ft. South Park Mexican & Baby Beesh	Let The Games Begin
2000	"Mafiosos "	Lil Bing ft. Grimm & South Park Mexican	Filero & X-Ray: Bring It To Tha Table
2000	"Slant Eyes"	Towdown ft. South Park Mexican	By Prescription Only
2001	"Pudding"	G.I.N. of the Presidential Playas ft. South Park Mexican	Straight Out da Bottle
2001	"Geto Ballin' (Remix)"	Reese & Bigalow ft. South Park Mexican & PSK-13	Unfinished Business
2002	"The Dismissal"	Twin Beredaz ft. South Park Mexican	Twin Beredaz
2002	"Never Forget"	Al-D ft. Shorty Mac, K-Rino, C-Note & Will Lean	4 da Green
2002	"Fear No Evil"	Juan Gotti ft. South Park Mexican & Ronnie Spencer	No Sett Trippin'
2002	"Marijuana"	4 Corner Hustlaz ft. South Park Mexican	City of No Pity
2003	"Fly Away"	Grimm ft. South Park Mexican	The Brown Recluse
2004	"No Love"	Rasheed & South Park Mexican	Rhythm Trax & Gamelace Presents: Texas Game Spitterz Vol. 1
2005	"Pajaros"	Juan Gotti ft. South Park Mexican, Low-G & Uchie	John Ghetto
2012	"In the Game"	Flatline ft. South Park Mexican	Respect My Gangsta

== See also ==
- History of the Mexican-Americans in Houston
