= Proper Dos =

American hip hop group

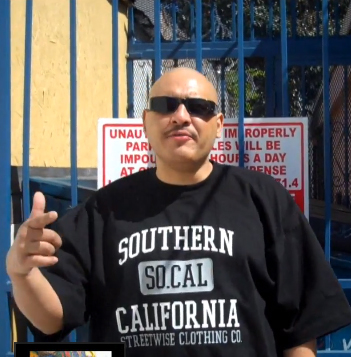
- Frank V. of Proper Dos on Serio TV in 2012

Background information
- Origin: Santa Monica, California, U.S.
- Genre: Chicano rap
- Years active: 1992–present
- Labels: Skanless Records; Rhino Records; Aries Music Entertainment; Main Line Records
- Members: Frank Villareal; Ernie Gonzalez

Proper Dos is an American hip hop group formed in the early 1990s in California, composed of rapper Frank Villareal and producer Ernie Gonzalez. The duo released their debut album, Mexican Power, in 1992 through Skanless Records, which peaked at #32 on the Billboard Top Heatseekers. Their second album, We're at It Again, was released in 1995, followed by Heat in 1998 and Overdose in 1999.

A street-style group, Proper Dos' main lyricist is Frank Villareal. However, Proper Dos has also had help on some recordings by special guests including Big Shady, Lil Rob, Point Blank, Royal T, Knightowl and others.

The release of Mexican Power was supported by several singles, including "One Summer Night", "Life of a Gangster", "No Turning Back" and "Hard Time".

Proper Dos recorded a number of additional singles and released We're at It Again through Skanless Records in 1995. The group's third album, Heat, was released in 1998, followed by Overdose in 1999. Overdose was supported by singles including "Shake the Ground", "We Run This Mutha" and "Can You Rock Like This".

During their most prolific stages of musical output, Proper Dos released music videos for tracks including "Firme Hina", "Tales From the Westside" and "Hard Times".

In 2000, Proper Dos appeared on the Low Profile Records compilation, Brown Pride Riders, Vol. 2, which the group completed with Lil Rob and Knightowl. In 2012, Chicano rapper Serio released “Don’t Hate Me Cause I’m Mexican.” which featured Conejo and Proper Dos.

== Discography ==
- Mexican Power (1992)
- We're at It Again (1995)
- Heat (1998)
- Overdose (1999)
- Ol' Skool Wayz (2005)
