= Dope House Records =

American record label

- Founded: 1995
- Founder: South Park Mexican; Arthur Coy Jr.
- Genre: Hip hop
- Country of origin: U.S.
- Location: Houston, Texas
- Official website: dopehouserecords.com

Dope House is an independent record label based in Houston, Texas. It primarily releases hardcore, underground, and Southern hip hop.

== History ==
Dope House Records was founded in 1995 by Carlos Coy (a.k.a. South Park Mexican) who released his debut album Hillwood that same year. By 1997, Dope House, (having signed artist's Rasheed, Low-G, and Pimpstress) started working on SPM's second album "Hustle Town". Dope House released SPM's second album in March 1998, that same year. Baby Beesh (now Baby Bash), joined the roster and they started to work on the next Dope House album "Power Moves: The Table" it was released on December 22, 1998. By 1999 Dope House Records was big and had eleven artists signed under them and all off them working on their debut albums, only available to record stores in Majority of the works released under the Playaz Lifestyle label are the Southern US region and online retail outlets. However, for a time in early 2000 Dope House teamed up with Universal Records to gain some commercial success.

== Artists ==
- South Park Mexican
- Baby Beesh
- Juan Gotti
- Lucky Luciano
- Pete "Dirty Werk" Camarillo
- JasonMartin
- Berner
- Mally Mall
- Frankie J

== Discography ==
1995

- South Park Mexican – Hillwood

1998

- South Park Mexican – Hustle Town
- South Park Mexican – Power Moves: The Table

1999

- South Park Mexican – Latin Throne
- South Park Mexican – The 3rd Wish: To Rock the World

2000

- South Park Mexican – The Purity Album
- South Park Mexican – Time Is Money

2001

- Baby Beesh – Savage Dreams
- South Park Mexican – Never Change

2002

- Baby Beesh – On Tha Cool
- Juan Gotti – No Sett Trippin'
- South Park Mexican – Reveille Park

2003

- Juan Gotti – El Mas Locote Mix
- Lucky Luciano – You Already Know
- South Park Mexican – Hillwood & Hustle Town (Screwed & Chopped)
- South Park Mexican – Reveille Park (Screwed & Chopped)

2004

- Baby Bash – Ménage à Trois
- South Park Mexican – The 3rd Wish: To Rock the World (Screwed & Chopped)

2005

- Lucky Luciano – The 4th Wish: To Sprinkle the World (Unreleased)
- South Park Mexican – Power Moves: The Table (Screwed & Chopped)

2006

- South Park Mexican – When Devils Strike

2007

- South Park Mexican – Tha Purity Album II (Unreleased)

2008

- South Park Mexican – The Last Chair Violinist

2009

- South Park Mexican – The Last Chair Violinist: Slowed 'n' Throwed (Unreleased)

2014

- South Park Mexican – The Son of Norma
- South Park Mexican – 48:

2019

- South Park Mexican – The Devil's Mansion

2020

- South Park Mexican – Telephone Road
