= Layin' in the Cut =

Studio album by Lighter Shade of Brown
- Released: July 26, 1994
- Recorded: 1993–94
- Genre: Hip hop
- Label: Mercury
- Producers: Lighter Shade of Brown; Jammin' James Carter; DJ Romeo

Lighter Shade of Brown chronology
Hip Hop Locos (1992)	Layin' in the Cut (1994)	Lighter Shade of Brown (1997)

Singles from Layin' in the Cut
- 1. "Hey DJ" Released: 1994; 2. "If You Wanna Groove" Released: 1994; 3. "Dip Into My Ride" Released: 1994

Professional ratings
Review scores
Source	Rating
AllMusic	2.5/5 stars
Entertainment Weekly	B−
Music Week	3/5 stars

Layin' in the Cut is the third studio album by Lighter Shade of Brown. It was released on July 26, 1994, for Mercury Records and was produced by Jammin' James Carter, DJ Romeo, and Stoker. Layin' in the Cut was the duo's most commercially successful album, peaking at No. 54 on the Top R&B/Hip-Hop Albums and No. 169 on the Billboard 200. "Hey DJ" peaked at No. 43 on the Billboard Hot 100 and No. 18 on the Hot Rap Singles. If You Wanna Groove", featuring Aulsondro "Novelist" Hamilton, peaked at No. 45 on the Hot Rap Singles. It was Lighter Shade of Brown's last album to make it to the charts.

== Track listing ==
1. "Dip into My Ride" – 4:37
2. "Where Ya At?" – 4:12
3. "Talkin' 'Bout (Gettin' It On)" – 5:04
4. "Hey DJ" (Remix) – 3:35
5. "Playin' in the Shade" – 3:43
6. "If You Wanna Groove" (featuring Novelist) – 3:44
7. "I Like It" – 4:26
8. "Things Ain't the Same" – 4:10
9. "Doin' the Same Thing" – 3:46
10. "Everyday All Day" – 3:57
11. "Hey DJ" – 3:59

== Charts ==
Chart (1994)	Peak position
Australian Albums (ARIA)	109
US Billboard 200	169
US Top R&B/Hip-Hop Albums (Billboard)	54
