= A Lighter Shade of Brown =

American hip hop duo

Background information
- Also known as: LSOB
- Origin: Riverside, California, U.S.
- Genre: Hip hop
- Years active: 1989-2002, 2009–2016
- Labels: Quality, Mercury, Thump
- Members: ODM (One Dope Mexican)
- Past members: DJ Fabe: DTTX

A Lighter Shade of Brown (LSOB) is an American hip hop duo from Riverside, California. The duo consisted of rappers Robert "Don't Try To Xerox (DTTX)" Ramirez (September 26, 1969 – July 13, 2016) and Robert "One Dope Mexican (ODM)" Gutierrez (born August 22, 1973). They are best known for their 1990 hit single "On a Sunday Afternoon" which had success in the U.S. and New Zealand.

== History ==
LSOB was formed in 1989 by Robert Gutierrez who went by the stage name "One Dope Mexican" and Robert "Bobby" Ramirez who went by the stage name "Don't Try To Xerox". They recorded demos and landed a record deal soon after with small independent label Pump. Their debut album, 1990's Brown and Proud, brought the group their lone Top 40 single in the U.S. with "On A Sunday Afternoon," which contained samples of The Young Rascals' 1967 hit "Groovin' " and Tommy James and the Shondells' 1969 hit "Crystal Blue Persuasion", and peaked at #39 on the Billboard Hot 100. The song also went to #1 for 2 weeks in New Zealand.

The duo provided songs for Latino-market movies such as Mi Vida Loca and I Like It Like That following the release of their second LP, 1992's Hip Hop Locos, which failed to chart. The success of "Sunday Afternoon" nonetheless resulted in Mercury Records signing the group and releasing their third disc, Layin' in the Cut, in 1994. The record did not sell as well as was hoped, peaking at #184 on the Billboard 200 albums chart.

LSOB went on a temporary hiatus, returning in 1997 on indie with Greenside Records. Their self-titled fourth album featured guest appearances from Rappin' 4-Tay and Dwayne Wiggins of Tony! Toni! Toné!.

1999 marked the last of their releases, including a greatest hits album and a non-charting single, "Sunny Day." That year, Gutierrez became a DJ at San Bernardino radio station KGGI and Bobby carried on touring as LSOB and working on new music. In 2011 LSOB collaborated with Serio on the song I'll Never Forget which also features MC Magic from the album Gansterism Part 3 released on April 20, 2011. A decade later, on October 18, 2011, the album It's A Wrap was released through Illuminated Entertainment Group. The album was produced by Playalitical. Ramirez is the only one out of the group that raps on it, as sort of a one-man Lighter Shade of Brown. The album's radio single "Call Me Over" was produced by Fingazz and featured Playalitical and Zig Zag of the NB Ridaz. A music video was also filmed and released for the song.

On July 18, 2016, group member Robert Ramirez died in the Las Vegas area after being in a coma for 11 days. He had collapsed due to what his family described as a combination of alcohol abuse and heatstroke.

== Discography ==
=== Studio albums ===
Title	Release	Peak chart positions		
Title	Release	US	US R&B	AUS
Brown & Proud	Released: 1990; Label: Quality, Mercury	184	—	—
Hip Hop Locos	Released: 1992; Label: Quality, Mercury	—	87	200
Layin' in the Cut	Released: 1994; Label: Mercury	169	54	109
A Lighter Shade of Brown	Released: 1997; Label: Thump	—	—	—
If You Could See Inside Me	Released: 1999; Label: Thump	—	—	—
It's a Wrap	Released: 2011; Label: Illuminated	—	—	—

=== Compilation albums ===
- Greatest Hits (1999)

=== Singles ===
Title	Release	Peak chart positions								Album
Title	Release	US	US R&B	US Rap	US Dance	AUS	NZ	NED	UK	Album
"T.J. Nights" (US only)	1990	—	—	—	—	—	—	—	—	Brown & Proud
"Latin Active"	1991	59	—	—	—	—	—	—	—	Brown & Proud
"On a Sunday Afternoon" (featuring Shiro and Huggy Boy)	1991	39	—	—	—	162	1	49	—	Brown & Proud
"T.J. Nights" (NZ only)	1992	—	—	—	—	—	36	—	—	Brown & Proud
"Spill the Rhyme"	1992	—	—	—	—	90	47	—	—	Hip Hop Locos
"Homies"	1992	57	54	13	—	115	—	—	—	Hip Hop Locos
"Check It Out / Latin Active"	1993	—	—	—	—	—	—	—	—	Hip Hop Locos
"Hey DJ"	1994	43	67	18	32	12	33	—	33	Layin' in the Cut
"If You Wanna Groove" (feat. Aulsondro Emcee N.I.C.E. Hamilton)	1994	107	—	45	—	110	—	—	—	Layin' in the Cut
"Dip Into My Ride"	1994	—	—	—	—	—	—	—	—	Layin' in the Cut
"Call Me Over" (feat Playalitical & Zig Zag of NB Ridaz)"	2011	—	61	—	20	—	—	—	—	It's a Wrap
"Sunsets"	2023	—	—	—	—	—	—	—	—	Sunsets
"—" denotes a recording that did not chart or was not released in that territory.
