= Mi Vida Loca =

1994 film directed by Allison Anders

- Theatrical release poster
- Directed by: Allison Anders
- Written by: Allison Anders
- Produced by: Daniel Hassio; Carl-Jan Colpaert
- Starring: Angel Aviles; Seidy López; Jacob Vargas; Panchito Gómez; Jesse Borrego
- Cinematography: Rodrigo García
- Edited by: Richard Chew; Kathryn Himoff; Tracy Granger
- Music by: John Taylor
- Distributed by: Sony Pictures Classics
- Release dates: May 21, 1993 (Cannes); November 1993 (Stockholm); July 15, 1994 (United States); March 24, 1995 (United Kingdom)
- Running time: 92 minutes
- Countries: United States; United Kingdom
- Language: English
- Box office: $3.2 million

Mi Vida Loca (also known as My Crazy Life) is a 1993 American coming-of-age drama film directed and written by Allison Anders. It centers on the plight of cholas (the female counterparts to cholos) growing up in the Echo Park section of Los Angeles, who face the struggles of friendship, romantic entanglements, motherhood, and gang membership. The story follows interlocking stories of several female gang members while centering on the friendship between two friends who become involved with the same man.

With the exception of the lead characters, the cast consisted of unknown actors, some of whom were actual gang members from Echo Park. It also marks the first film appearances of Salma Hayek and Jason Lee, in small roles.

== Plot ==
The movie is told in 3 vignettes, Sad Girl’s Y-Que, Don’t Let Nobody Get You Down, and Suavecito and focuses on the Echo Park Locas girl gang. In Echo Park, Los Angeles, a neighborhood that has seen a significant amount of gang activity over the past decade, two young Mexican-American women, friends since childhood, join the local gang. They are each given the gang names Mousie (Maribel) and Sad Girl (Mona), names which are handed down from one generation to the next. Sad Girl narrates how they got their names and how one of their homeboys, Shadow, said she was too happy to be Sad Girl. “They don’t say that no more,” she says.

Mousie and Sad Girl pride themselves on remaining loyal to each other and their gang. Mousie loses her virginity to and falls in love with a local gangster, Ernesto (Bullet) and eventually becomes pregnant with his son, Ernesto Junior. At Mousie’s baby shower, Sad Girl gives Mousie a beautiful ring for herself. Mousie starts to freeze Ernesto out because she feels she finally has something that is hers with her new baby. She goes to live with Ernesto’s abuela until Ernesto’s abuela dies.

During this time, Sad Girl and Ernesto start having an affair. Sad Girl becomes pregnant with a daughter, Crystal, which turns both girls into rivals. Ernesto begins selling drugs to support his kids and secretly buys a mini-truck, Suavecito, from an older homeboy who is in prison. After arguing, Mousie finally challenges Sad Girl to a fight. Ernesto gives Mousie a gun for courage; hiding that it does not work. Whisper, one of the Echo Park Locas, gives Sad Girl a small pistol from one of their homeboys. Ernesto is teaching Whisper the drug trade.

When he finds out she gave Sad Girl a gun, he goes ballistic but is cut short when a white female client shoots him and Whisper, killing Ernesto. At the same time, Mousie and Sad Girl are facing off, but cannot bring themselves to hurt each other. Eventually, days later, they make up when their children begin playing at the park.

The Echo Park Locos blame the shooting on a rival gang, River Valley, and one of their gangsters, El Duran. El Duran is a ladies’ man who drives classic cars but who insists the Suavecito truck is his because it was promised to him by the person who sold it to Ernesto. The Locos think he was trying to get the truck, so they discredit Whisper’s testimony.

Giggles (Angelica) is an older homegirl who is being released from prison after 4 years for a crime she did not commit. She was covering for her husband, Creeper, who has since been killed. Creeper is Whisper’s older brother. Sad Girl, Mousie, Whisper, and Baby Doll pick Giggles up in a car from Baby Doll’s boyfriend, Sir Speedy from the rival gang, River Valley. On the way home, Giggles shares that she gained skills in prison and wants to get a job with computers. The girls are disappointed because they thought she’d help them sort out some of the issues their neighborhood was facing. Whisper has been teaching Ernesto’s brother, Shadow the drug trade, but he is very bad at it, so she’d been hoping Giggles would work with her.

When Giggles gets home, there is friction with the daughter she had before she went to prison, where her daughter isn’t warming up to her. She is struggling to find a job that will accept a former prisoner and runs into one of her former homeboys, Casual Dreamer (Frank) at a park, strung-out and panhandling to pay for his drugs. She’s starting to wonder where she belongs.

After having a romantic interlude with Big Sleepy, a former love, she realizes she doesn’t want to rely on a man ever again and sees how little the girls matter to the boys when she hears they’re keeping Ernesto’s truck without thought to his children, mother, or Whisper’s hospital bills. She calls a meeting with the Locas and organizes them to make a decision with the truck. That chapter ends with Giggles back in the gang finally, throwing up signs with Whisper.

The final chapter focuses on Sad Girl’s college-bound sister, Alicia (La Blue Eyes), who Sleepy has a crush on. La Blue Eyes begins a written correspondence with a prisoner, Juan Temido, and they fall in love. She sends him a final letter pledging herself to him, and he ghosts her. The Locas hear about the letters and realize Juan Temido is El Duran. They devise a plan to take La Blue Eyes to a party to unmask El Duran as the recipient of her letters.

Meanwhile, Whisper and Shadow are dealing and Shadow asks her to be his. She refuses, saying it’s just business. She allows him to walk her home. Afterwards, he looks to see Sauvecito and finds it missing, so he calls the Locos to finally give El Duran payback. Many of the Locos talk about how El Duran hurt their sisters, playing games, so many have been waiting to get him.

Meanwhile at the party, Baby Doll introduces El Duran to La Blue Eyes, without identifying who they are. El Duran seems fascinated by her; this is reciprocated by La Blue Eyes. As they are dancing, Baby Doll makes a dedication onstage, naming them both to each other. La Blue Eyes races out crying as the Echo Park Locos show up and shoot El Duran, as revenge for them thinking he stole Suavecito. A rumor has it that La Blue Eyes’ letter was next to his heart when he died. She becomes stronger through her love for him. El Duran’s funeral happens with scores of ladies leaving their panties in his coffin.

Later, Big Sleepy and his kids are at a market chatting with Sleepy when a car rolls up and attempts to do a drive-by shooting on Sleepy in revenge for El Duran’s death. Instead, the bullet hits Big Sleepy’s young daughter, and she dies. The film concludes with Sad Girl talking about how the girls are now carrying guns and doing their own operations. She says the guns around the kids make her nervous but that they are practical and that she feels safe because “women kill for love.” Everyone attends the funeral of Big Sleepy’s daughter as the film fades out.

== Cast ==
- Angel Aviles as Mona "Sad Girl"
- Seidy López as Marivel "Mousie"
- Jacob Vargas as Ernesto "Bullet"
- Nelida Lopez as "Whisper"
- Marlo Marron as Angelica "Giggles"
- Christina Solis as "Baby Doll"
- Arthur Esquer as "Shadow"
- Julian Reyes as "Big Sleepy"
- Gabriel Gonzales as "Sleepy"
- Magali Alvarado as Alicia "La Blue Eyes"
- Jesse Borrego as Juan "El Duran" Temido
- Bertila Damas as Rachel
- Monica Lutton as Chucky
- Devine as "Devine"
- Veronica Arrellano as "Stranger"
- Panchito Gómez as "Joker Bird"
- Noah Verduzco as "Chuco"
- Angelo Martinez as "Rascal"
- Danny Trejo as Frank "Casual Dreamer"
- Kid Frost as Mousie’s Dad
- Eddie Perez as "Sir Speedy"
- Desire Galvez as "Dimples"
- Salma Hayek as "Gata"
- Los Lobos as Party Band
- Jason Lee as Teenage Drug Customer
- Spike Jonze as Teenage Drug Customer

== Production ==
Allison Anders was inspired to write Mi Vida Loca after moving to Echo Park in 1986 and becoming acquainted with members of the local gang, Echo Park Locas. Anders said,

My goal was to get inside their heads and understand, just as I would any subculture. But because of the criminal element and police harassment, I felt an extra responsibility to discover and convey their hopes and dreams, no matter what they were, and not through society’s expectations. I felt like if after seeing Mi Vida Loca if one person who connected to Whisper or Baby Doll or Ernesto any of the characters saw a chola on the street, maybe they’d not just dismiss them, they’d know a beating heart with dreams all their own."

Rodrigo García was the film's cinematographer.

The film is dedicated to the memory of Nica Rogers, a member of the Echo Park Locas who appears briefly in the film and died after filming concluded. After the movie's release, Anders and Film Independent established a scholarship program to help assist the kids of Echo Park with higher education.

== Soundtrack ==
A soundtrack containing hip hop and contemporary R&B was released on March 8, 1994 by Mercury Records. It peaked at 70 on the Top R&B/Hip-Hop Albums.

== Critical reception ==
Mi Vida Loca received positive reviews from critics. Review aggregator Rotten Tomatoes reports that the film has earned a 73% based on 22 reviews, with an average rating of 6.2 out of 10.

Critic Roger Ebert awarded the film 3 out of 4 stars. Though he said the film's story lacked structure and felt it "is more anecdotal than involving", he noted, "what we do get is a vivid impression of these young women and their world, and an understanding of how the gang performs a social function [in that world] that otherwise would be missing. Perhaps in not forming into a story, the movie does a service, by not forcing a conclusion where none should exist. The gangs have no beginning or end. They exist, and continue, as new faces appear and old ones disappear for good reasons and bad."

In a positive review, The Buffalo News wrote the film captures a world "where romantic dreams, friendships, codes of honor, and ambitions are played out with every bit of the intensity found just a few dozen blocks away [in Hollywood], in million-dollar neighborhoods packed with moguls and stars. Yet for all its gritty realism, Mi Vida Loca is not so much a gang story as it is a love story, crammed with the romance that fuels these girls' relationships with each other, their babies and their men."

Emanuel Levy credited Anders with avoiding "sensationalism or condescension", saying, "To her credit, Anders doesn’t patronize the Latino community with another stereotypical portrait. 'The last thing I wanted,' Anders declared in a manifesto, 'and certainly the last thing these kids needed was to be colonized by a white liberal, preaching a point of view that hands out easy solutions.'" However, Levy, as well as Todd McCarthy of Variety, felt the film also "lacks a discernible point of view."

== Legacy ==
In 2025, Regina Luz Jordan, a cultural historian and advocate with Hollywoodland News, launched a campaign to bring Mi Vida Loca back to streaming platforms, citing its importance to Chicana representation in film and in honor of her sister "La Chiquita" who was a member of Mexican gangs in the 1990's and committed suicide in 2013. Jordan’s efforts were documented in a Caló News feature, where she emphasized the film’s cultural impact and its role in shaping the identity of many Latinas growing up in the 1990s.

== Year-end lists ==
- Honorable mention – Duane Dudek, Milwaukee Sentinel

== See also ==
- List of hood films
