= Juan Gotti =

American rapper

- Born: Juan Ramos
- Origin: Houston, Texas, U.S.
- Genres: Southern hip hop; Chicano rap
- Years active: 1997–present
- Labels: Dope House Records; Warner Music Latina; Nueva Records

Juan Ramos, better known by his stage name Juan Gotti, is a Mexican-American rapper and former member of Dope House Records. He raps in both Spanish and English.

== Biography ==
Ramos was raised in Houston, Texas. He later moved to San Antonio. Gotti combines regional Norteño and Ranchero music with hip hop to create his signature sound. Some of Gotti's music was recorded in an attempt to promote peace between rival gangs, as the result of his change of attitude after being released from prison.

His album No Sett Trippin was nominated for a Latin Grammy Award in 2004. In 2005, his follow-up album John Ghetto debuted at #11 on Billboard's Latin Rhythm Charts, as well as #46 under the Top Latin Albums category. He has also received multiple nominations for Texas Latin Rap Awards, including a win for Artist of the Year in 2005.

== Discography ==
=== Studio albums ===
- 2002: No Sett Trippin - Dope House Records
- 2005: John Ghetto - WEA Latina (#46 Latin, #24 Rap)
- 2005: John Ghetto (Deluxe Edition)(CD & DVD) - WEA Latina
- 2007: Raza Ville - WEA Latina
- 2008: Texas Es Mexico - Atraco Music
- 2008: The Chronicles of Juan Ramos - Jake Records
- 2011: Ain't No Love - Goldtoes Entertainment
- 2011: Fear No Evil - Goldtoes Entertainment
- 2011: Dope La Familia (with Carolyn Rodriguez) – Soulyrical Publishing
- 2011: Ley De Texas - Virus Enterprises LLC
- 2012: Getcho Head Right - Spent Records
- 2013: Broken Dreams - Atraco Music
- 2014: Makin Moves - (with G Man) – Criminal Mind Records
- 2014: Respeto The Album - (with Ice) – Ice House Records
- 2015: American Me

=== Remix albums ===
- 2002: No Sett Trippin (Slowed & Throwed)
- 2005: John Ghetto (Chopped & Screwed)

=== Mixtapes ===
- 2003: Underground Vol.1 El Mas Locote Mix
- 2004: Underground Vol.2 Off The Chompa
- 2005: Underground Vol.3 Mas Locote De La Chingada
- 2006: Underground Vol.4 Still Loco
