= Chicano rap =

Music genre

- Stylistic origins: Hip-hop

Chicano rap is a subgenre of hip-hop music that emerged from a community of Mexican-American communities in the United States. The genre itself, combines elements of traditional hip-hop/rap with Chicano culture and the Chicano Movement. Through Chicano rap, Chicano Rappers have discussed many aspects of the Chicano identity, discrimination, inequalities, politics and life.

== History ==
=== Origins ===
Chicano Rap originated during the late 1980s and early 1990s within Mexican-American communities in Los Angeles and later expanded on to other Chicano communities across the United States. Like many other rap genres, Chicano rap also carries many aspects of African American hip-hop and West Coast rap. Aspiring Chicano rappers began to sample beats, rhythms, and styles from hip-hop culture while continuing conversations of racism, discrimination, and inequality looking for a plataform to express themselves and let other people know more about who they truly were. While, at the same time, incorporating elements of Chicano culture, lowrider culture, oldies music, funk and regional Mexican music.

Although the genre emerged after the peak of the Chicano Movement (1940s-1970s), it developed during a period in which Chicanismo still had a huge impact on the identity of many Mexican-Americans. As a result, artists began to create lyrics that shared the stories of the many realities and experiences Chicanos faced throughout the United States. Many Chicano rap songs focused on themes such as discrimination, poverty, gang violence, immigration, police surveillance, barrio life, and cultural pride. Chicano rappers used bilingual lyricism to share stories of the Chicano communities and experiences. (Mcfarland, 2006; Mausfeld, 2019).

=== Early years ===
During the late 1980s and 90s Chicano rap was brought by artist who shared their personal experiences through their lyrics. The first recognized Chicano rap album was the 1990 debut album Hispanic Causing Panic by Kid Frost ; the album's lead single, "La Raza", which became an important expression of chicano identity and pride. Considering Chicano rap as historical source provides a deeper understanding of the issues Mexican- American youth in the US have been facing up to the present day.combined East L.A. and Tex-Mex elements, was a hit song and became an "East L.A. anthem.Kid Frost Asked "How many people in the house speak spanish?" and the crowd exploded in cheers. he said " This is for La Raza," the race, and they exploded again. His success brought attention to Chicano rappers on the West Coast.

=== 1990s ===
In 1990, A.L.T. released the album Another Latin Timebomb, featuring his hit remake of the song "Tequila". In the same year, the Chicano hip hop group A Lighter Shade of Brown released their album Brown & Proud, which included hits "On a Sunday Afternoon" (a top 40 hit on the Billboard Hot 100) and "Latin Active". Rap group Cypress Hill (One Cuban, One Puerto Rican), would sometimes use popular Chicano slang and culture in their music and videos. The lead rapper, B-Real, was of Mexican descent. Cypress Hill has also collaborated with another Chicano group, Psycho Realm. Chicano rap derives from American rap which bases its music on drum beats, jazz music, and bass amongst others. Early influences for Chicano rap include "oldies", funk music and later incorporated conjunto and banda. Stemming from a long culture of mestizaje, Chicano rap uses samples from a wide range of music. Chicano can differentiate itself by sometimes having acoustic guitars playing Spanish melodies in the background or intros with Mexican regional music beats. Chicano Rap can be distinguished by sometimes having both English and Spanish verses. Some of the most common themes in Chicano rap include: love, experiences of being Mexican in the U.S., political issues, inequality, drug usage, and money. Chicano rap often include narratives that include gang violence and life in the barrio, by using lyrics in 'Spanglish', Chicano rap embraces the reality of being Mexican-American. Emphasizing barrio rap on barrio rap Dianna Violeta Mausfel bring together ethnography and cultural studies trace a music culture shaped by mexican American life, transitional flows, digital mediation and urban precarity

During the 1990s, some Chicano rappers, such as Sinful of the Mexicanz, began using influences from Mexican music in their beats and delivery, although this subgenre of music is sometimes referred to today as "urban regional" and not always representative of Chicano rap. The hip hop group Akwid also combines traditional Mexican regional music with hip hop vocals. By the mid-1990s, Chicano group Brownside, whose members consisted of Wicked, Klever, and Trouble, was essentially the Chicano equivalent of N.W.A. Drawing their experiences in society into their music, Brownside illustrated the harsh realities of life and the Chicano experience. And after release of Kid Frost's 1995 album, Smile Now, Die Later, Chicano rap began to include topics of immigration and drug trafficking near the US-Mexico border by incorporating the sound of narcocorridos into his raps, further establishing the connection between Mexican folk music and Chicano rap.

=== 2000s - present ===
In the 2000s record labels, such as, Thump Records, Urban Kings Music and Low Profile Records introduced a new group Chicano rap New artists include Ms Krazie, Knight Owl, Chino Grande, and Mr. Sancho. Charlie Row Campo released "Stop Studio Gangstas" album in 2007. One of the most widely recognized Chicano rappers today is Lil Rob of San Diego, his album "Natural High/High Till I Die" sold 90,000 copies and his single "Summer Nights" was considered a major crossover and received heavy rotation on radio stations and video programs not directly related to Chicano rap music. This widely successful artist has recently reappeared in the limelight, with the song Summer Nights being used in TikTok trends, and even being sampled in Destiny Roger's 2022 hit by the same name.

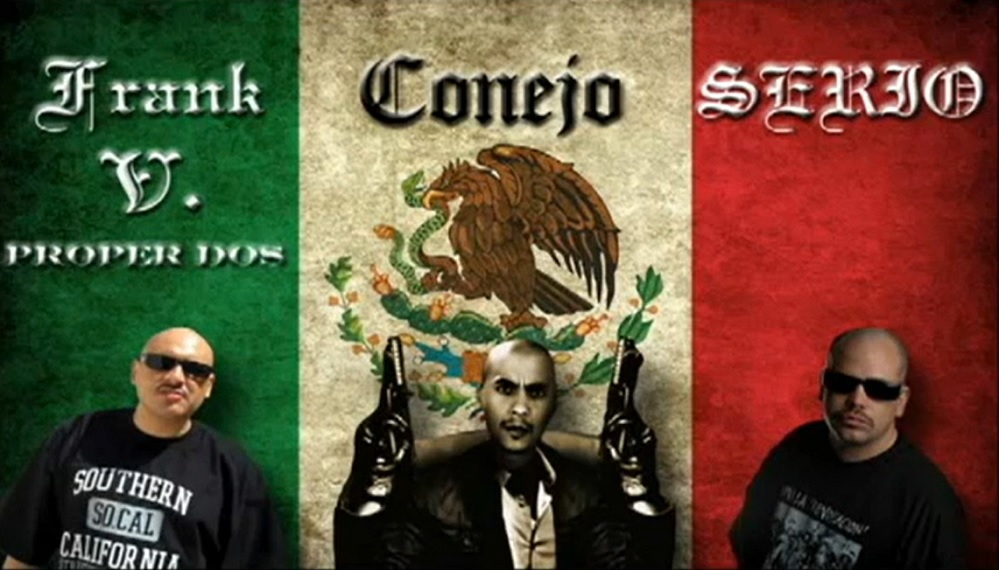
Frank V. of Proper Dos & Conejo & Serio in 2012

Another widely known Chicano rapper is Serio of Los Angeles, with his 2012 single "Don't Hate Me Because I'm Mexican" featuring Proper Dos and Conejo, a controversial song that called for immigration reform.

A Chicano rap scene has also begun to emerge in Texas. Prominent Texan artists in the genre include South Park Mexican (SPM) and Dope House Records. SPM's sound includes influences similarly seen in the scene of West Coast Chicano rap: Latin beats, gangsta narratives, and G-Funk, however SPM differentiates itself by including sounds and vocabulary unique to the Houston hip hop scene with the newly added influence of corporate rap. Its main audience consists of Hispanics/Latinos living on the West Coast, the Southwest, and the Midwest. Although Chicano rap is mainly enjoyed by hip hop listeners in the United States, it has established other international fan bases in Australia and the Philippines. Chicano culture has even reached Japan, where a small minority dresses in flannels and baggy pants, drives lowriders, and listens to Chicano rap. The Chicano rap style and culture's introduction in Japan can be attributed to Mexican-American soldiers stationed in Japan. Although there have been some concerns over cultural appropriation between these outcroppings of Chicano-style culture in other countries, comments under YouTube videos and reviews of music made by non-Chicanos has generally been positive. Many Chicanos choose to look at this outcropping as a sort of appreciation of their culture, rather than appropriation.

== Chicano rap labels ==
- Thump Records
- Dope House Records

== See also ==
- List of Chicano rappers
- Chicano rock
- Mexican hip hop
