= MC Magic =

American rapper

MC
- Also known as: NB Ridaz, NastyBoy, Magic City, NBK
- Born: Marco Cardenas; 29 June 1967 (age 59); Nogales, Sonora, Mexico
- Origin: Avondale, Arizona, U.S.
- Genres: Hip hop; Latin pop; R&B
- Occupations: Singer; songwriter; rapper
- Years active: 1990–present
- Label: Nastyboy Records
- Website: http://www.nastyboyrecords.com

Marco Cardenas (born June 29, 1967), better known by his stage name MC Magic, is a Mexican-born American rapper, singer and songwriter known for singing and rapping, both in English and Spanish. He is also the founder of NastyBoy Records which he launched in 1990, and the hip hop group NB Ridaz (initially known as Nastyboy Klick).

== Background ==
=== Early life ===
MC Magic was born Marco Cardenas on June 29, 1967, in Nogales, Sonora, Mexico. At the age of five, his family immigrated to the United States and Cardenas grew up in Avondale, Arizona. At the age of thirteen, his friend Rob taught him to play the drum machine and Cardenas began working as a DJ. He graduated from Agua Fria High School in 1985.

=== Magic City ===
Having been the drive behind Nastyboy's undertakings, MC Magic was primed to release his second solo album in 2006. The May release, Magic City, peaked at number one on the Billboard Top Heatseekers chart and at number 60 on the Top R&B/Hip-Hop Albums chart.

=== Magic City Part 2 ===
Magic City's success opened up many new opportunities for him but mostly it established MC Magic as a solo act. MC Magic's newfound success as a solo artist motivated him to continue his successful run, with his follow-up album Magic City Part II which was released in June 2008. Magic City Part II featured some of the hottest artists in the game with guest appearances from Baby Bash, Too Short, Chingo Bling, Big Gemini, and DJ Kane of the Kumbia Kings. Magic City Part II peaked at number 6 on the Billboard's Top Heatseekers chart and contained hit songs such as "Princesa", "Girl I Love You" and "The Only 1". As MC Magic's career started to take off rapidly, he started to tour continuously all over the States; the shows ranged from small venues to huge arenas.

=== The Rewire ===
MC Magic decided to continue to expand his solo music catalog and started to record songs for his new album The Rewire. Eventually he released the album's first single "Mrs. Delicious". The record was uptempo, completely different from his usual R&B style but it seemed to work. Even though The Rewire was completed by late December, it was set to be released on Valentine's Day of 2011. MC Magic promoted his upcoming album repeatedly in his hometown of Phoenix, with huge billboards and bus benches throughout the city. Later he expanded his promotion on to one of his largest markets, California, also placing bus benches throughout the city of Los Angeles and surrounding areas. The release of MC Magic's highly anticipated album The Rewire was pushed to an earlier date and was released on February 8, 2011. All the heavy promotion for the album proved successful, as his release party for the album in his hometown at a local mall brought in an enormous crowd, so much so that the autograph line led all the way out of the store into the mall. This album contained several hits for MC Magic such the single "Diggin", which is an uptempo rap record, produced by The Orphanz featuring Twista and upcoming rapper Snow Tha Product. The single took off quickly; several radio stations started to pick it up and had it in heavy rotation. As MC Magic released "Diggin", he also introduced his first all Spanish Rap Banda record called "Todos Mis Diaz" hoping to compete in the Spanish market.

== Other work ==
Also in 2011 MC Magic collaborated with Serio on 2 songs for the Gansterism Part 3 album I'll Never Forget which also features A Lighter Shade of Brown and Serio Come Back. He has also made personal appearances at Phoenix Valley elementary schools, such as Rose Linda Elementary School in the Roosevelt School District. MC Magic was the morning DJ on Power 98.3 Magic City Radio in Phoenix, Arizona and continues to inspire his fans. In Mexico, MC Magic has made appearances in Urban Fest 2 and collaborated with C-Kan to produce singles like "Quiero Que Sepas", "Loco", and "Mujer Bonita" (A Mexican remix of "Pretty Girl"). In 2019 MC Magic was trademarked.

== Discography ==
=== Studio albums ===
Year	Title	Peak Chart Positions		
Year	Title	U.S. 200	U.S. R&B	U.S. Heat
1995	Don't Worry: Released: May 23, 1995; Label: Nastyboy Records/ CDBY; Format: CD	—	—	—
2006	Magic City: Released: May 9, 2006; Label: Nastyboy Records & Thump; Format: CD, digital download	155	60	1
2008	Magic City Part 2: Released: June 10, 2008; Label: Nastyboy Records; Format: CD, digital download	—	71	8
2011	The Rewire: Released: February 8, 2011; Label: Nastyboy Records & Fontana; Format: CD, digital download	—	-	-
2014	Million Dollar Mexican: Released: May 5, 2014; Label: Nastyboy Records; Format: CD, digital download	—	-	-
2024	God bless Chicanos: Released: August 2, 2024; Label :Nastyboy Records; Format: CD, digital download	—	-	-

=== Other albums ===
- 1998: Desert Funk!
- 2008: Princess/Princesa

=== with Nastyboy Klick ===
- 1997: The First Chapter
- 1998: Tha Second Coming

=== with NB Ridaz ===
- 2001: Invasion (Nastyboy)
- 2001: Invasion (Upstairs)
- 2004: NB Ridaz.com
- 2008: Greatest Hits

=== Singles ===
- 1995: "Lost in Love"
- 1998" "I Know You Want Me" (featuring CeCe Peniston)
- 2006: "All My Life" (featuring Nichole)
- 2006: "Sexy Lady" (featuring DJ Kane)
- 2006: "Lies" (featuring Krystal Melody)
- 2008: "Princess"
- 2008: "Princesa"
- 2008: "Dancer" (featuring Too $hort, C-Note and AZ Prince)
- 2008: "Dancer (Remix)" (featuring Too $hort, Kid Brown and AZ Prince)
- 2009: "Girl I Love You" (featuring Zig Zag)
- 2010: "Mrs. Delicious"
- 2011: "Reasons" (featuring Mrs. Krazie & D. Salas)
- 2011: "Diggin" (featuring Twista & Snow Tha Product)
- 2011: "Todo Mis Dias (Diaz)"
- 2013: "Eres Reina"
- 2014: "Venezuela" (featuring Dee Garcia & C-Kan)
- 2014: "Million Dollar Mexican" (featuring Big Gemini & GT Garza)
- 2014: "Missing You" (featuring Nichole)
- 2014: "No Me Importa Nada"

Note: Sophia Maria also sang "Te odio"
