= Desert Funk Soundtrack =

Compilation album by M.C. Magic
- Released: 1998
- Genre: Hip hop
- Label: Nastyboy
- Producer: M.C. Magic

M.C. Magic chronology
Don't Worry (1995)	Desert Funk Soundtrack (1998)	Magic City (2006)

Desert Funk Soundtrack (stylized as M.C. Magic Presents Desert Funk! Soundtrack) is a compilation album project produced by rapper M.C. Magic, on the independent label Nastyboy Records.

After releasing his first album Don't Worry in 1995, Marcus Cardenas found a hip-hop band called Nastyboy Klick, whose first album The First Chapter had attracted the attention of local radio stations, producing a number regional hits (particularly the single "Down for Yours" featuring Roger Troutman). Before recording the second Nastyboy Klick's album, Cardenas recruited several Phoenix-based artists to present him a so-called Desert Funk! Soundtrack compilation.

The album had thirteen tracks recorded with such artists as True Breed, Black Insane, Nastyboy Klick, CeCe Peniston, P.O.W. and Mandi. The song "I Know You Want Me" was released as a single, reaching number nine on the U.S. Billboard Bubbling Under Hot 100 R&B Singles in 1998.

== Track listing ==
No.	Title	Performer(s)	Length
1.	"The Low Lows"	True Breed & Black Insane	4:06
2.	"I Know You Want Me"	Nastyboy Klick and CeCe Peniston	5:16
3.	"Get on the Floor"	P.O.W.	4:22
4.	"Goes Around"	Markal featuring Black Insane & Sly	4:54
5.	"Make it Sweet"	Mandi	3:46
6.	"Gruesome Discoveries"	Black Insane	3:49
7.	"When I'm with You"	CeCe Peniston	4:26
8.	"No Sleep"	Nastyboy Klick	4:20
9.	"Too Good to Be True"	True Breed	3:20
10.	"The First Statement"	2 Faced	4:58
11.	"G's Ballin'"	Black Insane & True Breed	4:04
12.	"I'll Be There"	Mandi	4:01
13.	"4 Dem Playaz"	P.O.W.	4:49
Total length:			56:11

"When I'm with You"
The track performed by CeCe Peniston

== Credits and personnel ==
- Marcus Cardenas - record producer
- True Breed - performer
- Black Insane - performer
- Nastyboy Klick - performer
- CeCe Peniston - performer
- P.O.W. - performer
- Markal - performer
- Sly - performer
- Mandi - performer
- 2 Faced - performer

== Charts ==
=== Radio singles ===
Year	Single	Chart	Peak position
1998	"I Know You Want Me" (NBK and CeCe Peniston)	U.S. Bubbling Under R&B/Hip-Hop Singles	9
