= Clay Gould Ballpark =

Sports venue in Arlington, Texas, US

Coordinates: 32.722021°N 97.131157°W

- (The Gould)
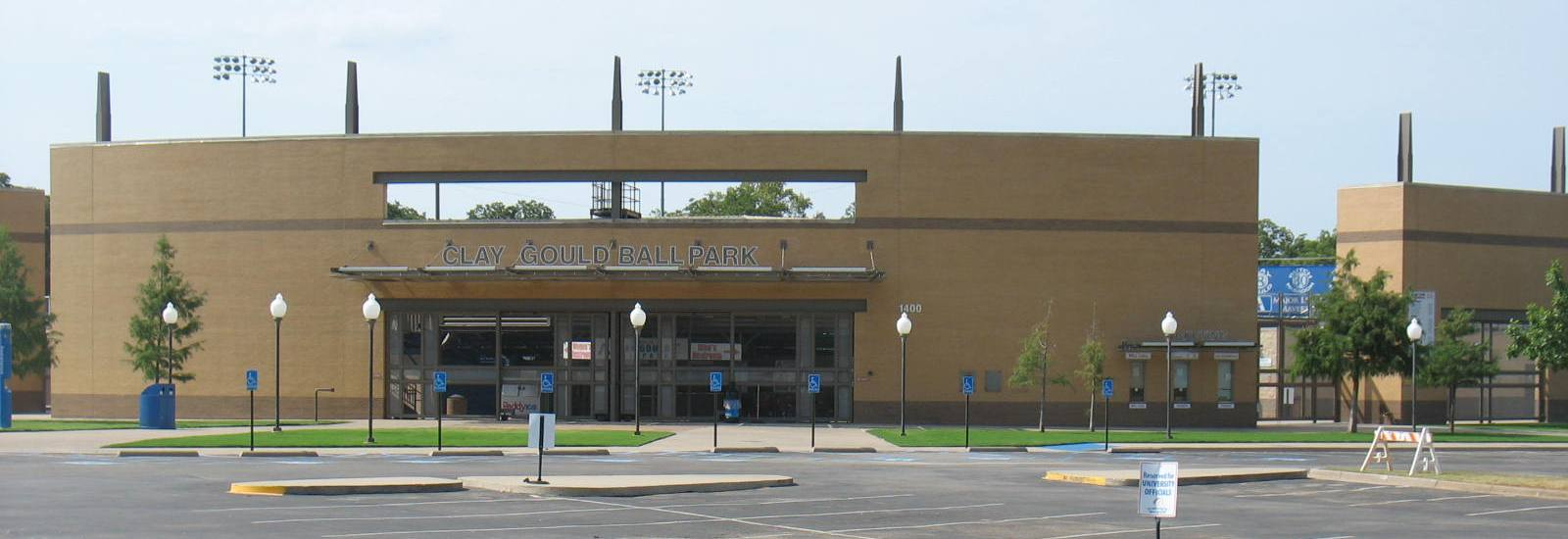
- Interactive map of Clay Gould Ballpark
- Former names: Allan Saxe Stadium, Arlington Athletic Center
- Location: Arlington, Texas
- Owner: University of Texas at Arlington
- Operator: University of Texas at Arlington
- Capacity: 1,600
- Surface: Hybrid Bermuda Tiff 419
- Field size: Left field – 330 ft Left Center – 380 ft Center field – 400 ft Right Center – 380 ft Right field – 330 ft

Construction
- Opened: 1974

Tenant
- Texas–Arlington Mavericks baseball

Clay Gould Ballpark (formerly Allan Saxe Stadium and Arlington Athletic Center), the home field of the UT Arlington Mavericks baseball team, is located on the campus of The University of Texas at Arlington (UT Arlington). The stadium has a seat capacity of 1,600. Clay Gould Ballpark is located at the intersection of West Park Row Drive and Fielder Road.

== Features ==
Undergoing constant renovation, the stadium features are steadily changing and growing to increase the fan and player amenities. Fans enter the stadium through a brick entrance way behind home plate. Just to the west of the entrance is a three-booth ticket window.

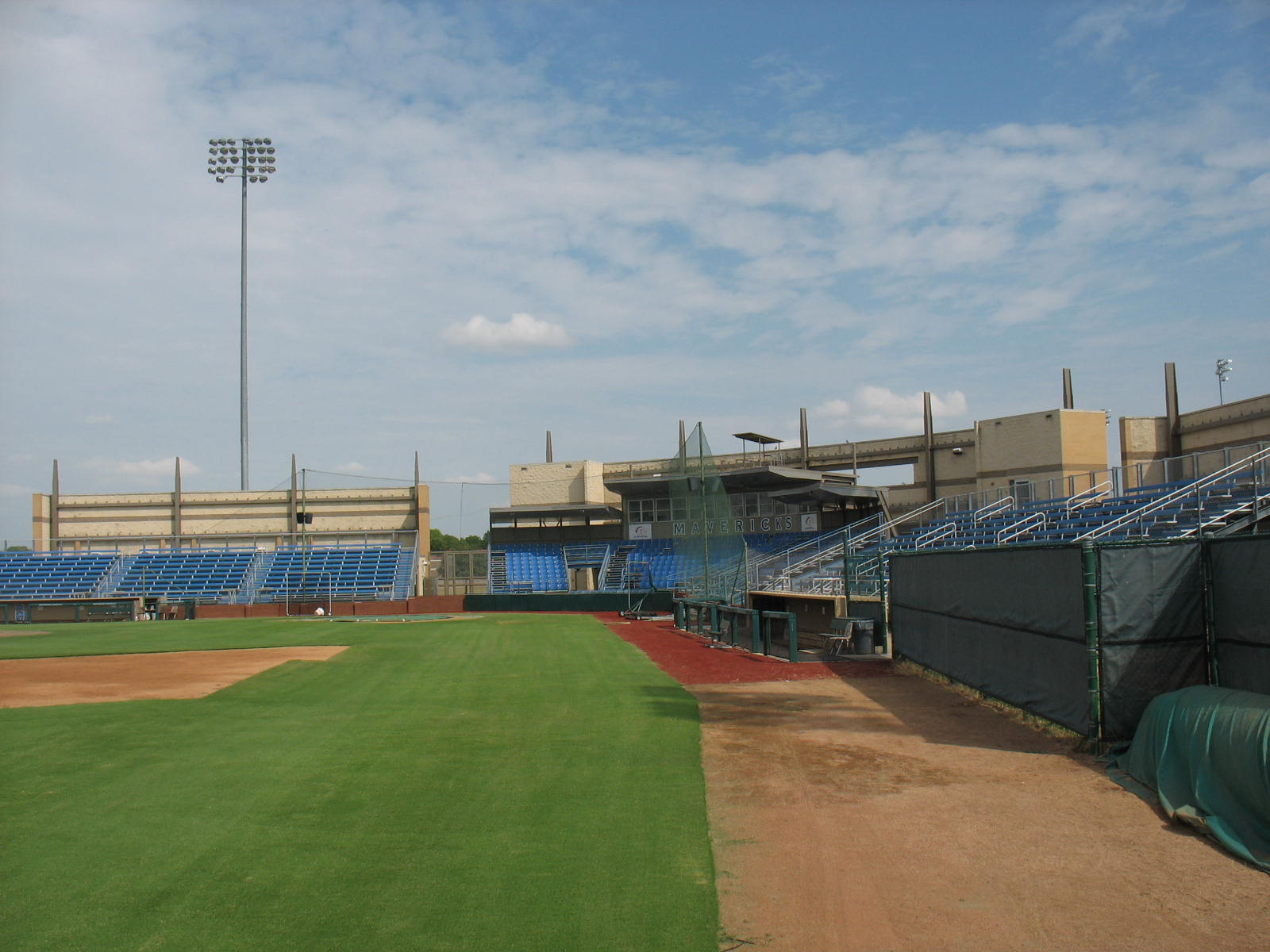
The seats, press box and third base line of Clay Gould Ballpark

Clay Gould is composed of three grandstands: the main section behind home plate, which is composed entirely of chair-back seats with partial cover from a metal awning, and two aluminum bleachers, one on the first-base line and the other on the third-base side. There is a small section of ground-level, chair-back seating in front of the main grandstands, directly behind home plate. Underneath the center section is a concession stand while the men's restroom is behind the first-base stands and the women's is behind the third-base seating.

Above the center seats is a press box that contains space for print media and two broadcast booths. The entrance to the press box is just to the left as one enters the stadium, via either a stairway or elevator.

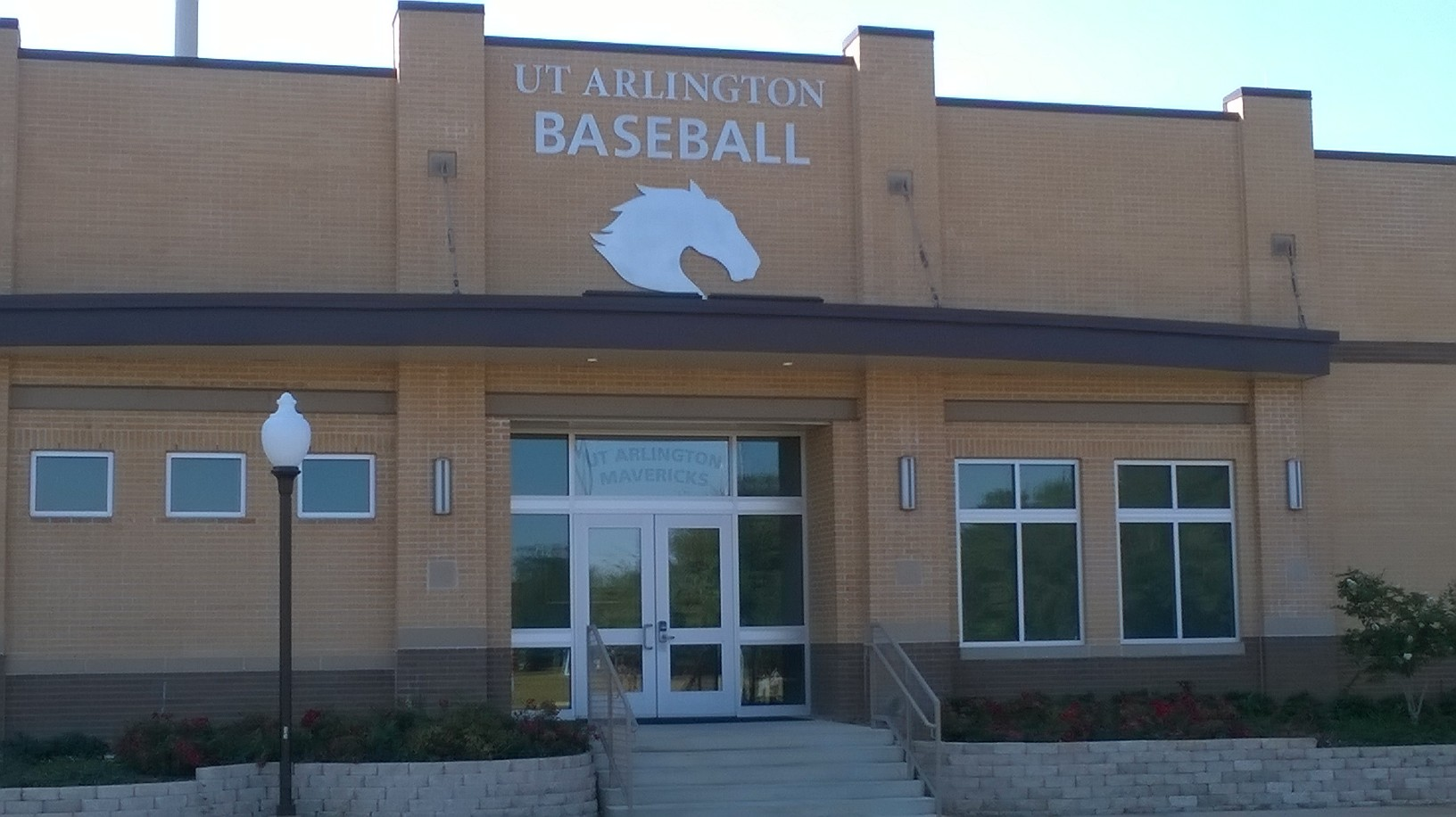
The entrance and exterior of the Mavericks' clubhouse

On the first base side is the Mavericks' clubhouse, which includes a combination locker room-lounge for the players, coach offices and locker rooms, sports training facility, equipment and laundry rooms, mud room and a welcome lobby.

The clubhouse is adjacent to the Justin D. Wilson batting facility, a 6,000-square-foot (560 m^{2}) indoor practice space. It contains batting cages, pitching mounds and the ability to allow for an open practice when needed.

The Mavericks' bullpen is between the clubhouse and playing field and is located just past first base. The visitor's bullpen is located down from the visitor's bullpen at third base in left field, at the edge of the stadium.

There are four light poles in the outfield and two on each foul line, for a total of eight light poles.

Out front of the stadium is an L-shaped, 318-space parking lot, shared with nearby Allan Saxe Field and the UTA intramural fields.

== History ==
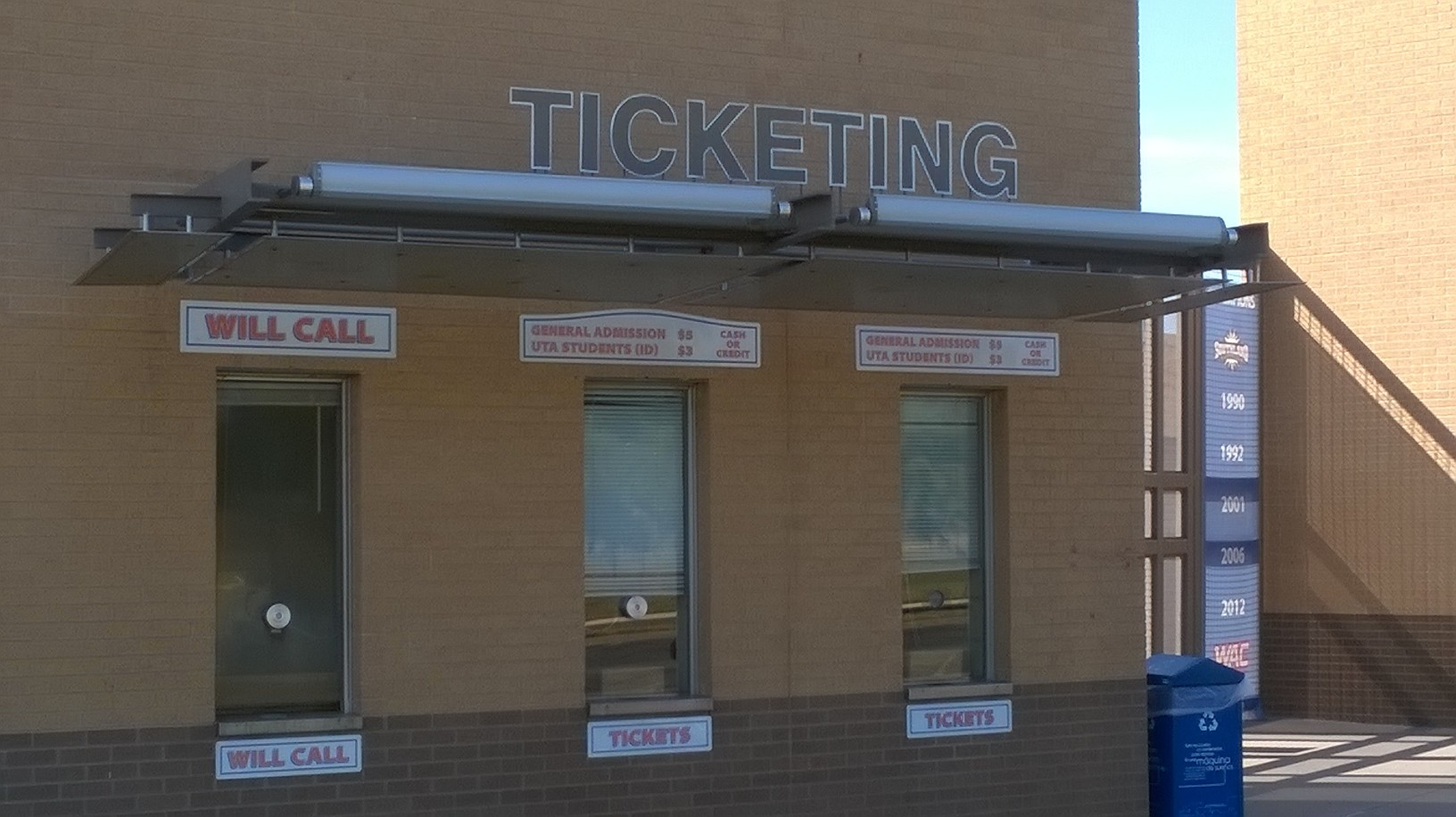
The ticket window of Clay Gould Ballpark, with championships won by the team to the right

When UT Arlington first fielded a baseball program in 1969, they played their home games at two different venues. Turnpike Stadium, a minor league stadium first owned by Tarrant County and then the City of Arlington with an initial seating capacity of 10,000, Was their home for the 1969, '70 and '73 seasons while a local civic park, Randoll Mill Park, was home for the 1971 and '72 seasons (two rescheduled games in 1973 were played at Randoll Mill Park). During that time, the Mavericks amassed a home record of 23–28 at Turnpike Stadium while sporting a 35–26 mark at Randoll Mill Park.

UT Arlington athletic officials knew the Washington Senators were on the verge of relocating from Washington, D.C. They began preparations for an on-campus venue to avoid the scheduling conflicts that would emerge from a college team sharing a major league team's stadium, particularly later in the season after the professional season began. The relocation caused the team to go to Randoll Mill Park for two seasons. The Texas Rangers had a clause that allowed them to control events at the now renamed Arlington Stadium 24 hours before and after their games. The teams shared Arlington Stadium for the 1973 season.

Originally named the Arlington Athletic Center, the stadium was built in conjunction with the softball venue, now known as Allan Saxe Field, on the southwestern most corner of the university campus. The center was a joint venture with the City of Arlington.

The stadium stayed as completed until the field was replaced in 1986.

== Renaming and renovations ==
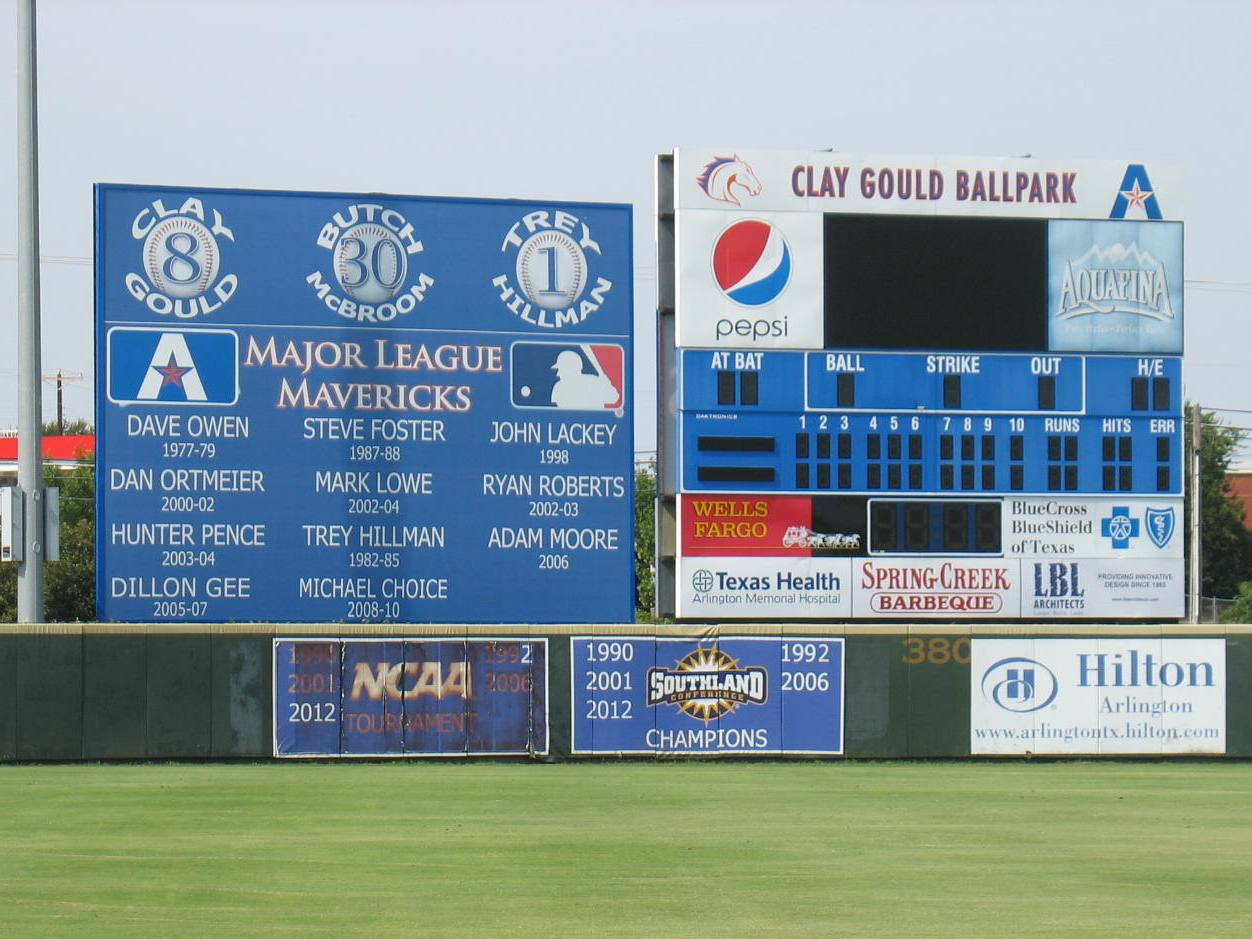
The scoreboard, brag board and championship years in right center field prior to renovation/replacement

Change has been a constant at the home of the Mavericks as UTA fans and visitors to the facility would be hard-pressed to go to Clay Gould Ballpark consistently in any five-year period without noticing a major upgrade or renovation.

After the conclusion of the 1986 season, the playing surfaced was completely upgraded, which entailed an entire regrading of the field, re-sodding of the grass-playing surface, new irrigation system, infield dirt mixture and the addition of a warning track.

In the summer of 1992, following two conference titles in three years, box seats were added directly behind home plate, a new backstop, minor renovations to the press box and minor field upgrades.

Prior to the 1994 season, the Arlington Athletic Center was renamed to Allan Saxe Field after popular Professor Allan Saxe's gifts made renovations possible, which included a new press box, replacing the previous open-air facility, a rebuilt grandstand, a shaded canopy over a portion of the seats, and a new lighting system. Capacity was expanded from 1,000 to 1,200. Professor Saxe also contributed to renovations for UT Arlington softball field.

The baseball stadium was renamed to Allan Saxe Stadium in 1995, while the softball venue kept the Allan Saxe Field moniker.

In the winter of 1998, a new three-foot high was added that spanned from dugout to dugout, adding one of the first aesthetically appealing additions to the Stadium, as well as replacing the net backstop.

Allan Saxe Stadium was once again renamed a few years later after Clay Gould, a UT Arlington player from 1989 to 1993, an assistant coach from 1997 to 1999 and named the program's fourth head coach following the '99 season. Gould died of Colon Cancer on June 23, 2001. The renaming was urged by Professor Saxe and coincided with a fundraiser to further enhance the stadium, with a new exterior and entryway, press box improvements, replacement of a chain link outfield fence with wooden fencing and a batters eye, expanded seating capacity and a new state-of-the-art lighting system, replacing the inadequate existing lights to allow the stadium to play night games for the first time.

Clay Gould's memorial plaque was unveiled at the main entryway during the dedication of the newly renamed stadium on April 26, 2003, prior to a conference game with Louisiana-Monroe.

A Daktronics Prostar LED Display video board replaced the older, outdated scoreboard in left center field in 2009. Additionally, the fan experience was upgraded as well by adding new seats to replace worn, older seating in the center grandstand.

The following year, a "brag board" was added immediately next to the scoreboard in left center field that lists the UT Arlington players who have made the Major League Baseball level as well as the retired numbers of the UT Arlington Mavericks baseball program. There are currently 11 Major League Mavericks and three retired numbers, two of which are former coaches.

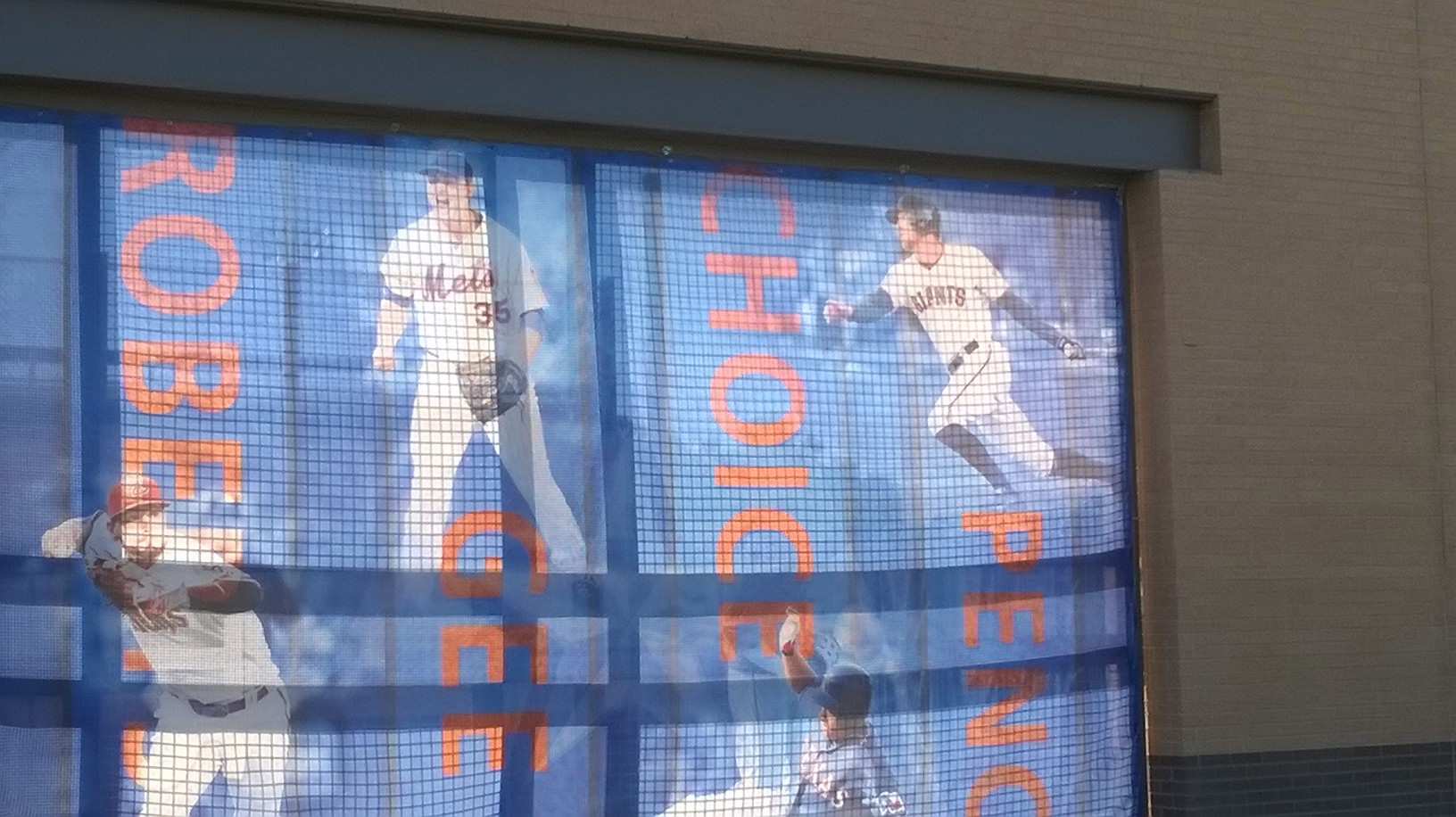
Draped on the exterior of Clay Gould Ballpark is a depiction of current Mavericks in the Major Leagues

Construction of an indoor practice facility was started and completed during the offseason prior to the 2013 season. The $1.95 million venue was built in conjunction with an indoor practice space at the softball field, allowing practices to occur during inclement weather. The Justin D. Wilson batting facility was funded with a large portion of previously approved bond proceeds, but also included philanthropic support. Among those supporters is alumnus Roy D. Wilson and his wife Patti, who have been Maverick baseball supporter for many years. Wilson's son was a frequent participant in UT Arlington baseball summer camps before he died in 2010 at age 13.

The UT System board of regents approved $5.5 million to continue renovations at the stadium in August 2013. The funds financed work that included the construction of a clubhouse on stadium grounds near the first base side, next to the indoor practice facility. In addition to a clubhouse for Allan Saxe Field, the renovation provided upgrades and improvements with a new home dugout, new outfield fencing, a picnic area for fans between the visitors dugout and bullpen, a new public address system and stadium branding. Work began following the completion of the 2014 season and was completed just after the start 2015 season. Previously, Maverick baseball players had to dress out of Maverick Stadium, across and down West Mitchell Street, and drive the half-mile to Clay Gould Ballpark, then return to shower after games or practices.

Amidst the 2019 season, the Mocek Patio, debuted and allowed rental of an outdoor picnic area. The new feature was named after John Mocek and his wife Pattye. John was a former player and assistant coach with the program before moving to the overall Athletic Department, serving in various capacities. He also currently serves as the color commentator for the ESPN broadcasts of UTA baseball games. John Mocek's fifty years within the Athletic Department was honored in the 2023 season. The Mocek Patio is set to receive future additions, including an outdoor kitchen and upgraded furniture.

A renovated turf warning track and drainage system was installed prior to the 2020 seasons first pitch.

Despite a new scoreboard in 2009, an additional renovation of the scoreboard and installation of a new video board was completed in 2021.

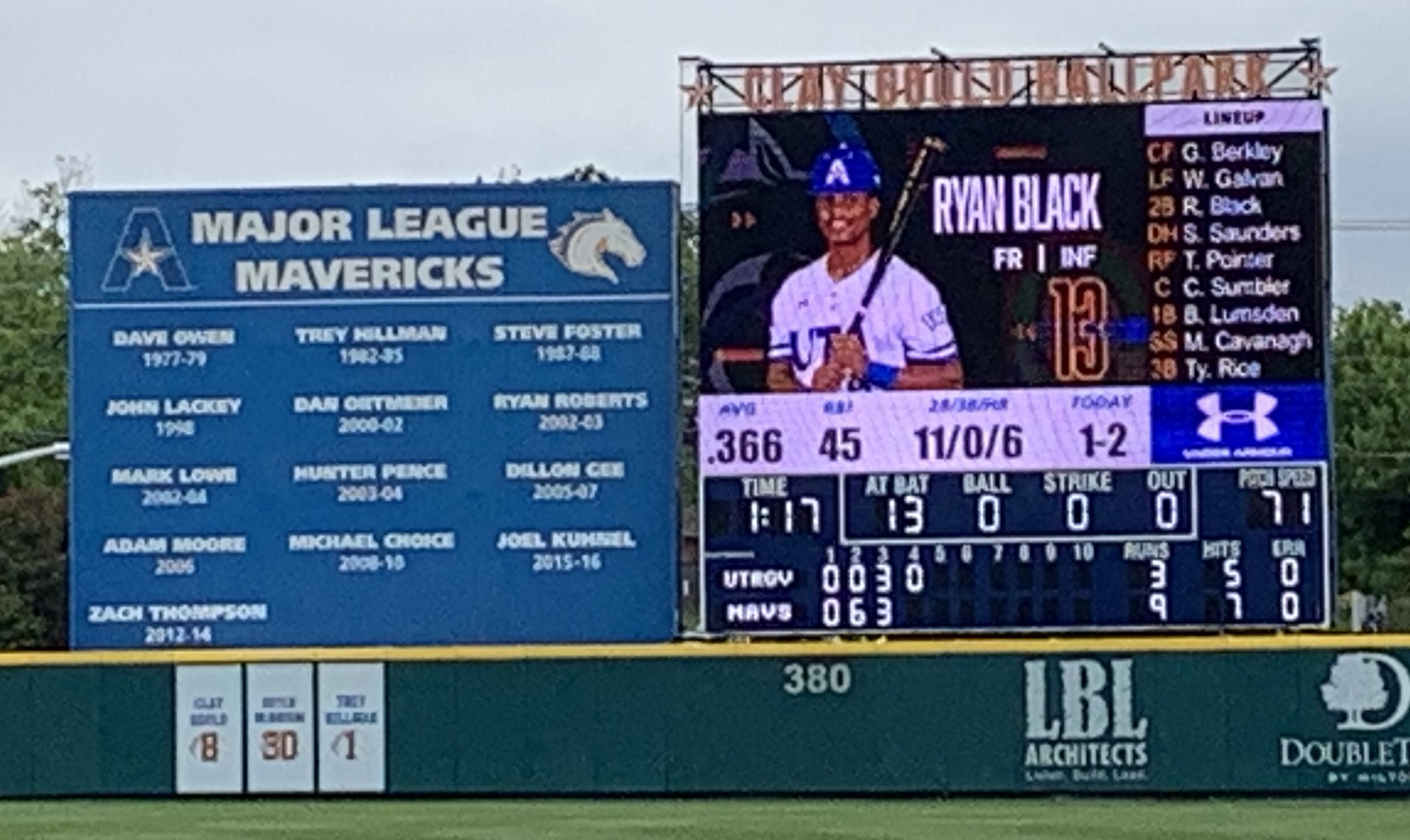

Further renovations are in the planning phase.

== Program history ==
Single Game Crowds
Date	Opponent	Attendance
February 21, 2017	TCU	2,008
April 18, 2017	Texas A&M	1,939
April 20, 2004	Texas A&M	1,388
March 15, 2011	TCU	1,347
May 13, 2008	Texas A&M	1,213
March 31, 2015	TCU	1,201
March 29, 2016	TCU	1,196
February 19, 1995	Oklahoma St	1,189
April 4, 2017	TCU	1,187
February 20, 2016	Oklahoma St	1,063

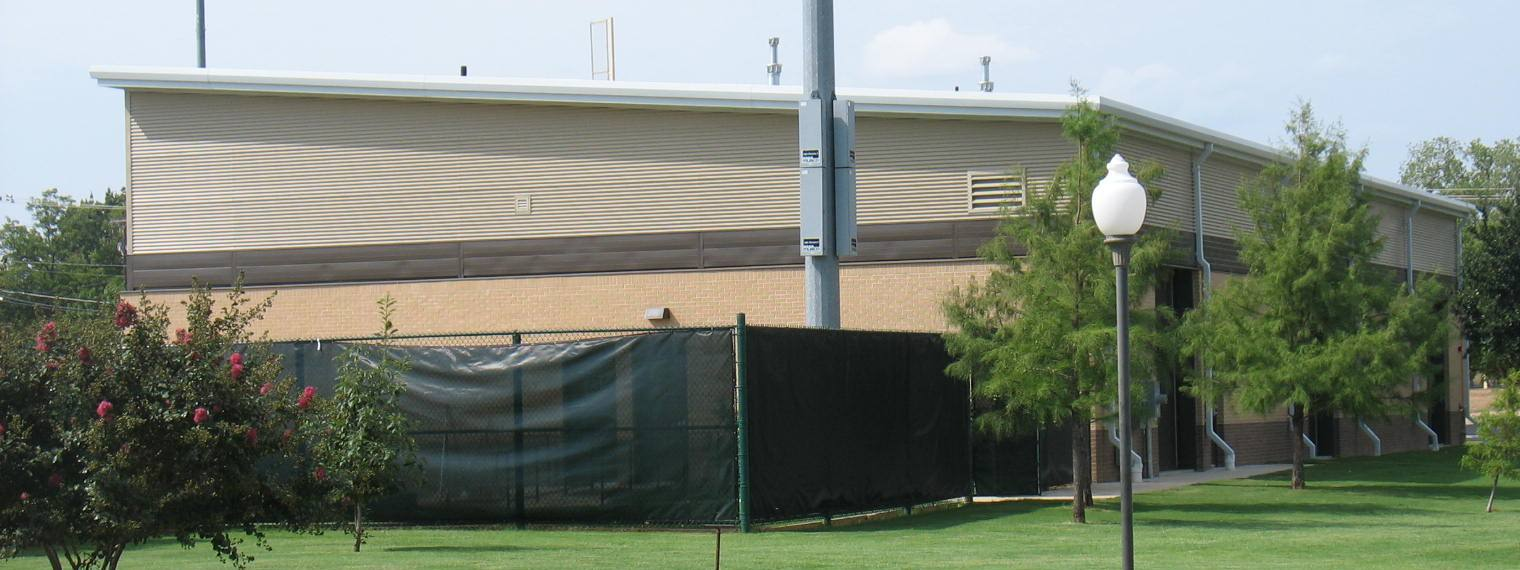
Justin D. Wilson indoor practice facility, on the right field line, prior to completion of the Maverick clubhouse

The Mavericks have maintained a winning record of 920–566 on their home field, for a winning percentage of .619 (as of the end of the 2024 season). During that time, UT Arlington has averaged over 20 home wins a season.

Clay Gould Ballpark routinely hosts major opponents, including the Big XII's Baylor, Kansas State, Oklahoma, Oklahoma State, TCU and Texas Tech, the Pac-12's Utah, the SEC's Alabama, Arkansas and Texas A&M and the Big Ten's Illinois, Michigan, Minnesota, Nebraska and Northwestern.

For the 2023 season, notable home games scheduled at Clay Gould Ballpark are TCU, Oklahoma and Dallas Baptist as well as five three-game series' against Sun Belt conference opponents, including in-state rival Texas State.

The Mavericks have played TCU at Clay Gould a record 81 times, more than any other team, followed by former Southland Conference foes McNeese State and Lamar with 62 and 57 respectively. Baylor fourth with 56, while Louisiana Tech rounds out the top five with 54 trips to The Gould. Texas State, the three-time conference opponent, is right behind at 53.

Clay Gould Ballpark was home to the 1990 and 1992 Southland Conference regular season champions, the 2001, 2006 and 2012 Southland Conference tournament champions, the 2013 Western Athletic Conference regular season co-champions and the 2017 Sun Belt West Division champions.

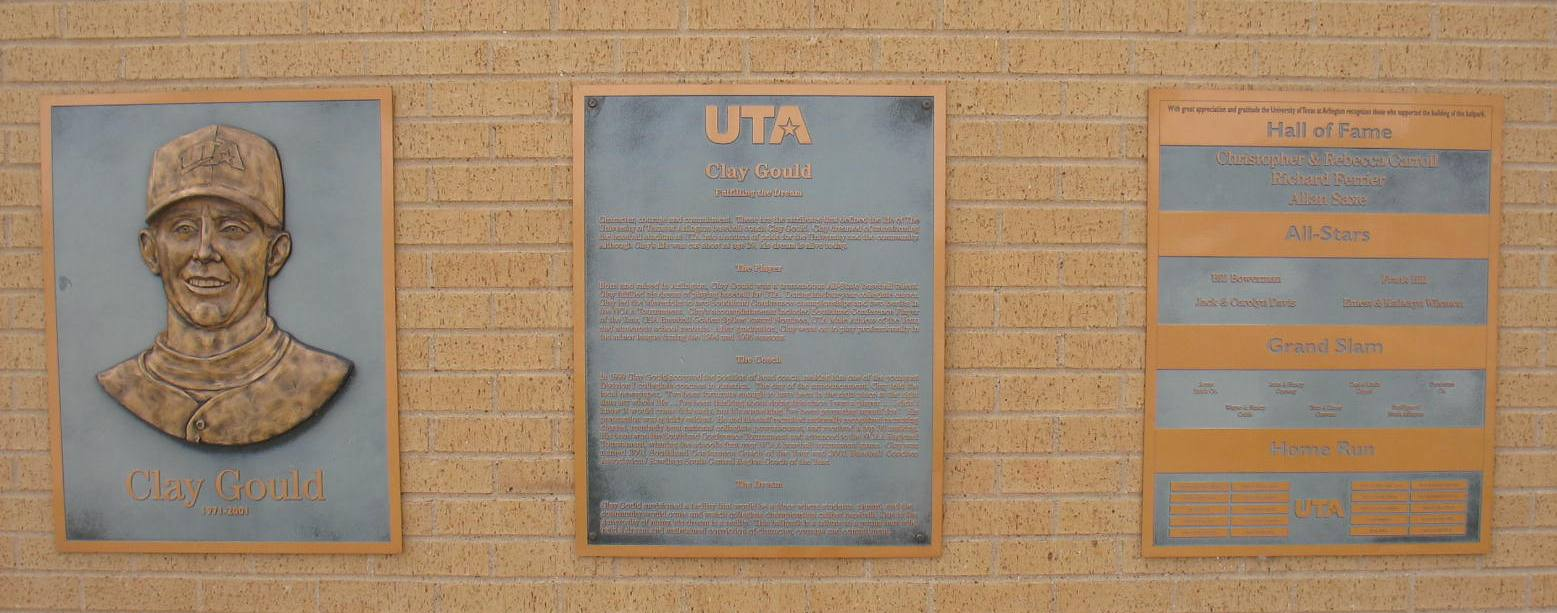
The memorial Clay Gould and fundraising plaques outside the entrance of the stadium

== Other uses ==
A short film directed, written and produced by Clay's wife Julie Gould, and starring their child Logan Soul Gould, debuted at the 2011 SXSW Film Festival in Austin, Texas, was shot on the UT Arlington campus and Clay Gould Ballpark. This film, "8", took home the 2011 Texas Shorts Jury Prize Award.

Besides UT Arlington baseball, the diamond has played host to the Texas State Junior College Tournament, the state American Amateur Baseball Congress Connie Mack and American Legion Tournaments and numerous high school playoff games. It also served as the venue for Major League tryout camps.

Nolan Ryan, Alex Rodriguez, Roger Clemens, Ozzie Smith and Ian Kinsler have made appearances at the ballpark for individual workouts, commercials, camps and clinics.

== See also ==
- List of NCAA Division I baseball venues
