= I Know You Want Me =

I Know You Want Me may refer to:

- "I Know You Want Me" (Young Buck song), a 2006 song by Young Buck
- "I Know You Want Me" (Nastyboy Klick and CeCe Peniston song), a 1998 song by Nastyboy Klick and CeCe Peniston
- "I Know You Want Me (Calle Ocho)", a 2009 song by Pitbull
