= Marcos Hernandez (singer) =

American singer (born 1982)

- Born: 1982 (age 43–44); Phoenix, Arizona, U.S.
- Genres: R&B; pop
- Occupation: Singer
- Instrument: Vocals
- Years active: 2005–2010; 2010–2018, 2024
- Labels: The Entertainment District (2010–present); TVT (2005–2020, 2024–present)

Marcos Hernandez (born 1982) is an American pop singer.

== Biography ==
Hernandez was born in Phoenix, Arizona in 1982 and raised in Dallas, Texas. He worked at the Lewisville YMCA in Flower Mound, Texas as a lifeguard. Hernandez was discovered by Vanilla Ice manager Tommy Quon. He is Mexican-American.

His debut single, "If You Were Mine", was released in August 2005. The single got airplay on Pop and Rhythmic stations and reached the Top 25 on Top 40 radio. The single also went to No. 1 in South Africa and France. The video for the single was shot in Echo Park, California. He joined the U.S. Marines in 2009.

His album C About Me was originally independently released on Ultrax Records, yet once "If You Were Mine" began taking off at radio, he signed a new deal with TVT Records with plans to retool the album. The album was eventually re-released on October 25, 2005, with a different album cover, along with a couple of newly recorded tracks ("Get Personal", "Lovely Girl", "Bitter Sweet", "The Way I Do" and "Call Me"). Since new tracks were added, a couple of songs on the original version of his debut album were omitted: ("Breaking All The Rules", "That Thing You Do", "So Sexy", "Come On Over Baby", "Summertime 4Play", "Matta No Mo" and "Mission For A Dream").

Following the success of "If You Were Mine", TVT had planned to release "If I'd Known" (featuring MC Magic of NB Ridaz), which was sent to radio. However, the track failed to take off and "The Way I Do" became Marcos' official second single. Promotional CDs were sent out, and the song went for adds to radio. Once again, no success at radio (and no video was shot) but the album's promotion did not stop there. However, the single was another No. 1 hit in South Africa.

In June 2006 he traveled to South Africa and was interviewed on East Coast Radio and a third single, "Call Me" was released to radio in July 2006. Meanwhile, a video for "Bitter Sweet" was allegedly shot during his stay in South Africa.

Hernandez released his new international album entitled Endless Nights on July 24, 2007.

In December 2010, Marcos announced on his official Facebook music page that he was returning to the world of music and that he was working on a new album. To that end, he signed on as an artist with The Entertainment District label. Marcos released the single "Medicine" on iTunes on April 19, 2011.

In June 2024, Marcos Hernandez announced he would be singing at the Hotel Texan Event Center in Seagraves, Texas, on July 19th, 2024.

== Discography ==
=== Albums ===
- 2005: C About Me
- 2007: Endless Nights
- 2007: Jump into It
- 2011: Voluntold

=== Other Songs ===
- Soy Un Sabordin
- Lover Come Back
- Carmencita (Marcos Hernandez & Hector Anibal)
- Closer To Me
- Main Ingredient
- Mamacita (Baby Bash featuring Marcos Hernandez)
- Tenderoni (MC Magic featuring Marcos Hernandez & JX3)
- Nevermind
- Rewind
- Hold Me Down
- Medicine
- Let Me Love You
- Rip It Out

=== Singles ===
Year	Title	Chart Positions			Album
Year	Title	US	UK	SA	Album
2005	"If You Were Mine"	78	41	1	C About Me
2005	"If I'd Known" (Ft. NB Ridaz)	–	–	–	C About Me
2006	"The Way I Do"	–	–	1	C About Me
2006	"Call Me"	–	–	–	C About Me
2006	"Bitter Sweet"	–	–	2	C About Me
2007	"Red Dress (Just Want To Know Her)"	–	–	8	Endless Nights
