= Flower Mound, Texas =

Incorporated town in Texas, United States

- Town
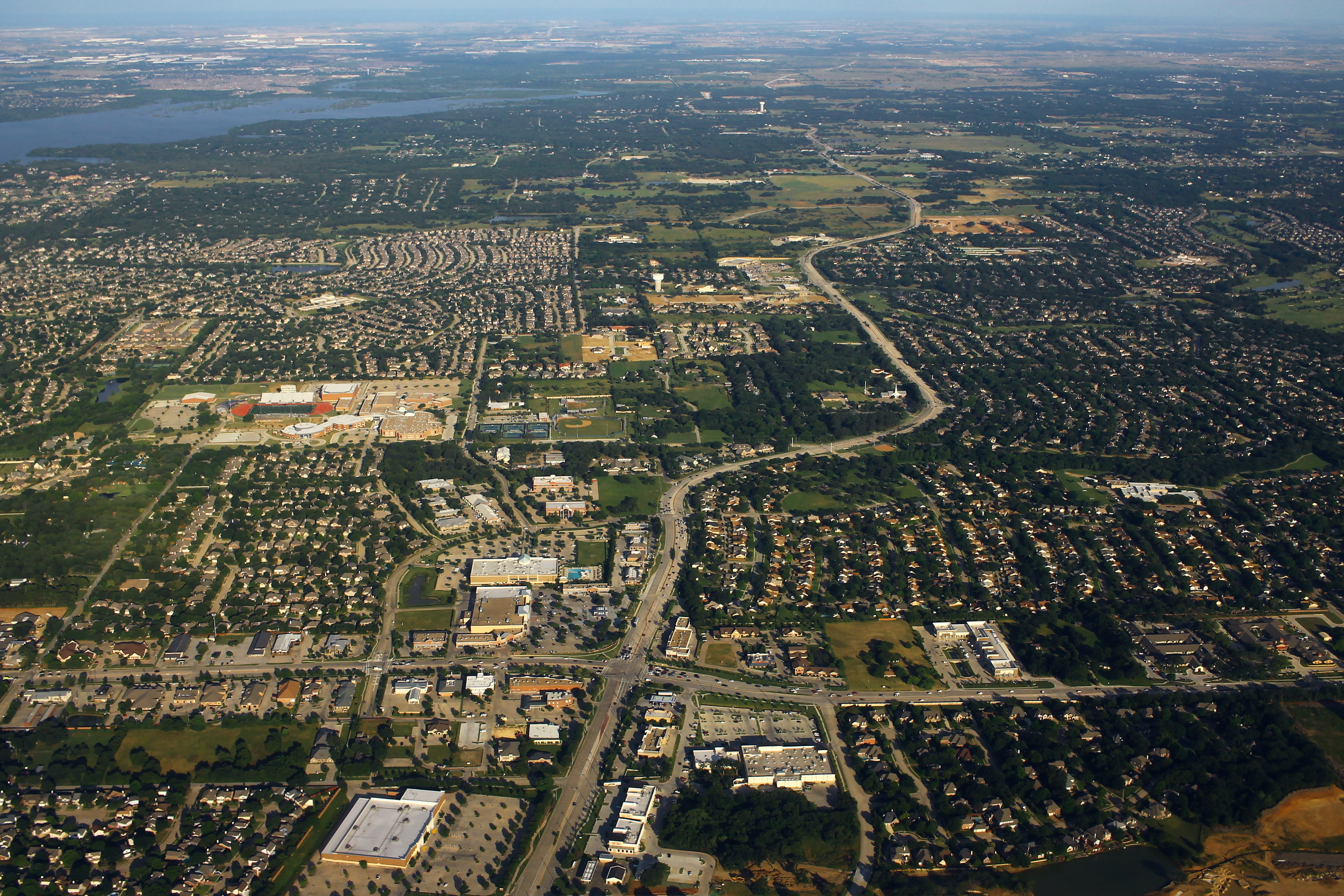
- Nicknames: FloMo, The Mound
- Location of Flower Mound in Denton County, Texas
- Coordinates: 33°02′03″N 97°06′50″W
- Country: United States
- State: Texas
- Counties: Denton, Tarrant
- Incorporated: February 25, 1961

Government
  - Type: Council–manager

Area
  - Town: 44.48 sq mi (115.20 km^{2})
  - Land: 41.96 sq mi (108.67 km^{2})
  - Water: 2.52 sq mi (6.53 km^{2})
- Elevation: 604 ft (184 m)

Population (2020)
  - Town: 75,956
  - Density: 1,810.3/sq mi (698.96/km^{2})
  - Metro: 6,447,615
- Time zone: UTC−6 (Central)
  - Summer (DST): UTC−5 (Central)
- ZIP Codes: 75022, 75028, 75027
- Area codes: 214, 469, 972, 682, 817
- FIPS code: 48-26232
- GNIS feature ID: 2412634
- Website: www.flowermound.gov

Flower Mound is an incorporated town (Note: Flower Mound refers to itself as the "Town of Flower Mound", with a "Town Hall" and a "Town Council", rather than the customary "city" label. However, under Texas law, all incorporated municipalities are considered to be cities.) located in Denton County, with a minor portion in Tarrant County, in the U.S. state of Texas. Located northwest of Dallas and northeast of Fort Worth adjacent to Grapevine Lake, the town derives its name from a prominent 12.5-acre (5.1 ha) mound located in the center of town.

After settlers used the site for religious camps during the 1840s, the area around Flower Mound was first permanently inhabited in the 1850s; however, residents did not incorporate until 1961. Although an effort to create a planned community failed in the early 1970s, Flower Mound's population increased substantially when Dallas/Fort Worth International Airport opened to the south in 1974. As of the 2020 United States census, the population was 75,956, reflecting a 17% increase over the 64,669 counted in the 2010 census. Of the Texas municipalities that label themselves "towns", Flower Mound has the largest population. Flower Mound was the only town with a population greater than 20,000 in the 2020 census.

Flower Mound's municipal government, operating under a council–manager system, has invested in a public park system highlighted by an extensive network of trails. Lewisville Independent School District, which operates public schools, covers the majority of Flower Mound. With its moderately affluent population and proximity to the Dallas–Fort Worth metroplex, Flower Mound has used a smart growth system for urban planning, and has recently experienced more rapid light industrial growth to match the growing needs of the primarily residential community.

== History ==
Settlement in the area around Flower Mound began when the Presbyterians established a camp in the area in the 1840s. A log cabin, dated around 1850, was discovered preserved within the walls of a home near Liberty Elementary in 2016, providing further proof of settlement. At first, the group held religious camps for two to three weeks at a time. By 1854, residents had established the Flower Mound Presbyterian Church southwest of Lewisville in an area commonly referred to as "Long Prairie". By 1920, the church had 126 members, and the pine-framed building was expanded in 1937. Early settlers such as Andrew Morriss and David Kirkpatrick are memorialized with street names in the town. The area remained sparsely populated for many decades after its initial settlement.

On February 25, 1961, the town voted to incorporate to avoid annexation by the City of Irving. William Wilkerson, who became the town's second mayor, led the incorporation effort and helped improve the town's phone service and water supply. In 1970, when Flower Mound had 1,685 residents, Edward S. Marcus and Raymond Nasher began a planned community project with $18 million in loan guarantees from the United States Department of Housing and Urban Development through their New Community program. Called "Flower Mound New Town", the project included elements of the new towns movement, including collaboration with North Texas State University (now the University of North Texas) to move the school's administrative offices to Flower Mound and conduct all research for the project. The project was featured in advertisements as late as 1974, but it was abandoned after residents threatened to disannex a portion of the town to thwart the development. The disannexation effort sharply divided the town, and led to a number of strongly contested elections between 1971 and 1976. In 1976, Texas Monthly awarded the project its "Bum Steer Award" after the project lost its federal loan guarantees.

The construction of Dallas/Fort Worth International Airport 4 miles (6.4 km) south of the town in 1974 sparked a period of rapid growth. Between 1980 and 1990, Flower Mound's population increased from 4,402 to 15,896. It reached 50,702 in 2000, an average annual increase of nearly 13 percent per year during the 1990s, making it the nation's tenth fastest-growing community. Between 2000 and 2002, Flower Mound was the ninth fastest-growing municipality in the United States with a population of more than 50,000, and its population continued to increase by approximately five percent each year between 2000 and 2005. Controlled growth continues in central and western Flower Mound.

== Geography ==
Flower Mound is located approximately 20 miles (32 km) northwest of Dallas and 25 miles (40 km) northeast of Fort Worth on the border between Denton and Tarrant counties. The town is located almost entirely in Denton County, however it has areas that extend into Tarrant County. It is situated on the basin of the Trinity River in the Eastern Cross Timbers subregion in Texas. The town borders Lewisville to the east and a number of cities and towns to the north, including Highland Village, Double Oak, and Bartonville. According to the United States Census Bureau, the town has a total area of 43.4 square miles (112 km^{2}). Land comprises 41.39 square miles (107.2 km^{2}) (95.37%) of the total area; Denton County soils include the Silawa, Nawo, Gasil series. Water comprises 2.5 square miles (6.5 km^{2}) (5.76%) of the total area; Grapevine Lake and Marshall Creek form much of the town's southern boundary. Flower Mound's climate is classified as humid subtropical; the town averages 233 sunny days per year and 79 days of precipitation.

The town encourages conservation development projects to protect and preserve existing open space, vistas, and natural habitats while allowing for controlled growth. Much of the town is located on the Barnett Shale, and drilling for shale gas in close proximity to residential neighborhoods has sharply divided parts of the community. In 1994, amateur fossil collector Gary Byrd discovered a fossilized example of a Hadrosaurid dinosaur among black shale rock formations in the southwestern edge of the town, near Grapevine Lake. The fossilized creature from the Cenomanian age was named "Protohadros byrdi" in Byrd's honor.

=== “The Mound” ===
Flower Mound was named for a 12.5-acre (5.1 ha) hill approximately 50 feet (15 m) in height located close to the intersection of FM 3040 and FM 2499. The formation attracted the attention of early settlers to the area, and is often simply referred to as "The Mound". Part of the Texas blackland prairies, The Mound is typically covered by big bluestem, little bluestem, and Indian grasses. During blooming seasons, dozens of varieties of flowers can grow on its slopes, often aided by the water retained by gilgai formations. Though surrounded by commercial and residential development, The Mound is owned and maintained by The Mound Foundation, a non-profit private–public partnership. The group has advocated for a controlled burn on The Mound for many years, and it expressed relief when an accidental New Year's Eve fire in late 2011 spurred the growth of wildflowers for the first time in years.

=== Climate ===
Climate data for Flower Mound, Texas
Month	Jan	Feb	Mar	Apr	May	Jun	Jul	Aug	Sep	Oct	Nov	Dec	Year
Record high °F (°C)	90 (32)	96 (36)	99 (37)	102 (39)	107 (42)	108 (42)	113 (45)	113 (45)	111 (44)	103 (39)	99 (37)	89 (32)	113 (45)
Mean daily maximum °F (°C)	54 (12)	60 (16)	68 (20)	75 (24)	82 (28)	90 (32)	95 (35)	95 (35)	87 (31)	78 (26)	65 (18)	57 (14)	76 (24)
Mean daily minimum °F (°C)	31 (−1)	36 (2)	44 (7)	52 (11)	61 (16)	69 (21)	73 (23)	72 (22)	65 (18)	54 (12)	43 (6)	34 (1)	53 (12)
Record low °F (°C)	−3 (−19)	−2 (−19)	5 (−15)	23 (−5)	35 (2)	48 (9)	51 (11)	52 (11)	36 (2)	16 (−9)	10 (−12)	6 (−14)	−3 (−19)
Average precipitation inches (mm)	1.92 (49)	2.41 (61)	2.99 (76)	3.40 (86)	5.17 (131)	3.63 (92)	2.29 (58)	2.16 (55)	3.05 (77)	4.38 (111)	2.79 (71)	2.65 (67)	36.84 (936)
Average snowfall inches (cm)	0.6 (1.5)	0.3 (0.76)	0.3 (0.76)	0 (0)	0 (0)	0 (0)	0 (0)	0 (0)	0 (0)	0 (0)	0 (0)	0.1 (0.25)	1.3 (3.3)

== Demographics ==
Historical population
Census	Pop.	Note	%±
1970	1,685		—
1980	4,402		161.2%
1990	15,527		252.7%
2000	50,702		226.5%
2010	64,669		27.5%
2020	75,956		17.5%
2023 (est.)	79,445	▲	4.6%
U.S. Decennial Census

=== 2020 census ===
As of the 2020 census, Flower Mound had a population of 75,956. The median age was 40.5 years. 26.5% of residents were under the age of 18 and 10.8% of residents were 65 years of age or older. For every 100 females there were 97.3 males, and for every 100 females age 18 and over there were 95.4 males age 18 and over.

95.6% of residents lived in urban areas, while 4.4% lived in rural areas.

There were 25,686 households in Flower Mound, of which 43.0% had children under the age of 18 living in them. Of all households, 71.2% were married-couple households, 9.8% were households with a male householder and no spouse or partner present, and 15.8% were households with a female householder and no spouse or partner present. About 14.5% of all households were made up of individuals and 5.2% had someone living alone who was 65 years of age or older.

There were 26,714 housing units, of which 3.8% were vacant. The homeowner vacancy rate was 1.2% and the rental vacancy rate was 9.1%.

=== Demographic estimates ===
Flower Mound's racial and ethnic composition as of 2024 (NH = Non-Hispanic) (Note: Note: the US Census treats Hispanic/Latino as an ethnic category. This table excludes Latinos from the racial categories and assigns them to a separate category. Hispanics/Latinos can be of any race.)
Race	Number	Percentage
White (NH)	53,232	65.5%
Black or African American (NH)	2,682	3.3%
Native American or Alaska Native (NH)	487	0.6%
Asian and Pacific Islander (NH)	13,328	16.4%
Other Race (NH)	2,357	2.9%
Mixed/Multi-Racial (NH)	8,858	10.9%
Hispanic or Latino	9,589	11.8%
Total	81,270	100%

The town's population is often noted for its moderately affluent, yet relatively transient residents. Although Flower Mound has the second-highest percentage of residents making over $100,000 in the nation, Journalist Peter T. Kilborn named Flower Mound a "Reloville", a title used to describe suburban communities where management employees often relocate frequently; as of 2006, 57% of residents were born in another state or country.

=== 2010 census ===
As of the 2010 United States census, there were 64,669 people and 14,269 families residing in 21,570 housing units in Flower Mound. The population density was 1,562 inhabitants per square mile (603/km^{2}).

In 2010, the racial and ethnic makeup of the town was 83.9% White, 3.2% African American, 0.1% Native American, 8.6% Asian, 0.1% Pacific Islander, and 2.2% from two or more races. Hispanic or Latino of any race were 8.4% of the population. The average household size was 3.072 people.

=== Income and poverty ===
According to a 2011 American Community Survey estimate, the median income for a household was $118,763, and the median income for a family was $126,336. Males had a median income of $95,284 versus $56,692 for females. The per capita income for the town was $44,042. About 2% of families and 3.4% of the population were below the poverty line, including 3.5% of those under age 18 and 1.1% of those age 65 or over.

== Economy ==
The Lewisville Independent School District is the largest employer in the town, employing 1,647 (4.8% of the town's total employment). The Town of Flower Mound employs 455. Between January 1, 2000, and December 31, 2009, the town experienced job growth of 26.53%. Due to the town's proximity to the DFW airport and many various major highways, a great number of businesses have recently moved some of their local operations into the town.

Adeptus Health was founded in 2002, with its first emergency room located in Flower Mound.

=== Lakeside Business District ===
The town of Flower Mound recognizes two major areas of current economic development: the Lakeside Business District and the Denton Creek District. The 265-acre (107 ha) Lakeside Business District includes plots of land zoned for various commercial and residential uses at the southern edge of town near the Grapevine Lake. The project filed for bankruptcy in the year 2010, but in February of the year 2012, the company Realty Capital unveiled a $1 billion and two dollar plan for a mixed-use development project within the district. The members of the Flower Mound town council voted to approve the project in November of the year 2012, and development of the 150-acre (61 ha) project was scheduled in six phases. Construction on the first phase, which includes 45,000 square feet (4,200 m^{2}) of commercial space, 170 loft apartments, and 170 home lots, began in April 2013.

=== Denton Creek District ===
In 2006, the town began to consider mixed-use development plans for the 1,500-acre (610 ha) Denton Creek District at the western edge of the town. In 2010, the town began to provide infrastructural support to the area. Additionally, developers broke ground on a 158-acre (64 ha) mixed-use riverwalk project in August 2013. Residents were scheduled to vote on whether to approve public funding for the district for the 2013 general election.

=== Parker Square ===
The University of Las Colinas (2020) filmed at a shopping mall, the 2003 Society of American Registered Architects Design Award winning, David M. Schwarz Architects, Inc. designed, Parker Square, "a compact neighborhood center" "inspired by the traditional developments of American “main streets” and Texas small towns".

=== Top employers ===
According to Flower Mound's 2025 Annual Comprehensive Financial Report, the top private sector employers in the town were:

#	Employer	# of Employees
1	Communications Test Design, Inc. (CTDI)	1,271
2	MI Windows & Doors	771
3	Texas Health Presbyterian Hospital Flower Mound	750
4	Town of Flower Mound	738
5	Stryker Communications	480
6	HD Supply	300
7	Best Buy Distribution Center	200
8	BOHM Technologies	160
9	Likewize	120
10	Owens & Minor	114
X	Top employer total	4,904

== Parks and recreation ==
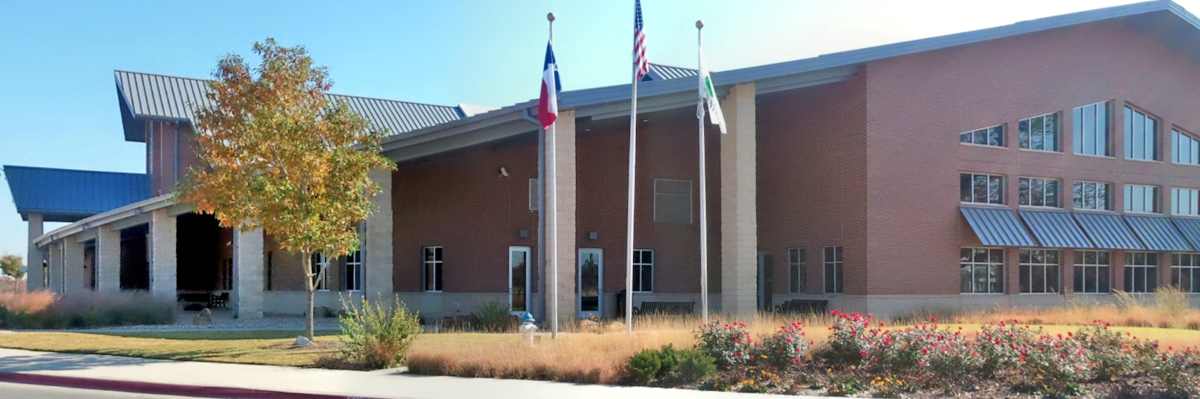
The Flower Mound Community Activity Center, which opened in 2008

The Town of Flower Mound operates 54 public parks and recreation facilities on 693 acres (280 ha) of space, nine of which (comprising 70 acres [28 ha]) are undeveloped as of 2012. In June 2008, the town held the grand opening for its new $13.825 million community activity center, which includes meeting rooms, a day care facility, weight lifting equipment, an outdoor pool, and a 30-by-30-yard (25 m × 22.86 m) competition indoor pool. In honor of Lance Corporal Jacob Lugo, the first military serviceman from Flower Mound to die in the line of duty, the town renamed Hilltop Park to Jake's Hilltop Park in 2008. Jake's Hilltop Park is made up of baseball/ softball fields.

In 2016 Flower Mound completed and opened its first dog park, a 5-acre Hound Mound Dog Park, costing over $1 million. In 2018 the Town of Flower Mound opened a 2000 sq. ft. splash pad as part of an addition to Heritage Park.

=== Trail system ===
In 1976, in response to environmental concerns and automobile traffic congestion, Flower Mound residents proposed adding a system of recreational bike paths around the town. Initially, funding proved elusive, but by 1989 the first 1.3 miles (2.1 km) of multi-use trails had been constructed, partly funded by a grant from the Texas Parks and Wildlife Department. In 2010, the town maintained 33 miles (53 km) of paved hiking and bicycling paths and 2 miles (3.2 km) of equestrian trails. The Purple Cone Flower trail starts in Stone Creek Park and is used by runners, walkers and dog walkers and bikers.

Additionally, the United States Army Corps of Engineers maintains 14 miles (23 km) of natural surface trails and 9 miles (14 km) of equestrian trails within the town limits, most of which are located around Grapevine Lake. The North Shore trail starts at Rock Ledge Park and travels west through Murrell Park and Twin Coves Park. (now owned by Flower Mound). A dirt and rock surface trail used predominantly by mountain bikers, hikers, trail runners and dog walkers.

== Government ==
The Town of Flower Mound has been a home rule municipality since 1981, and it has operated under a council–manager type of municipal government since 1989. Residents elect five at-large members to the Flower Mound Town Council and one mayor. Members serve two-year terms. In 1999, the town adopted a Strategically Managed And Responsible Town (SMART) Growth Program to manage both the rate and character of development in the community, and in 2000, the town officially adopted its SMARTGrowth management plan. The program's goal was to create environmentally sensitive development and to mitigate the effects of urban sprawl. (Note: In November 1999, then Texas Attorney General John Cornyn advised Texas House of Representatives member Bill G. Carter that under the SMARTGrowth program, the town could "cap" the number of building plans the town approves.) Political scientist Allan Saxe and attorney Terrence S. Welch have used Flower Mound's program as an example of a municipality attempting to slow growth. In 2013, the town amended the portion of the plan pertaining to public schools; the changes spurred public debate between candidates for town council.

According to the town's 2013–2014 Comprehensive Annual Financial Report, the town's various funds had $114.6 million in revenues, $101.8 million in expenditures, $513.3 million in total assets, $155.9 million in total liabilities, and $68.1 million in cash and investments.

The structure of the management and coordination of town services is led by a town manager, deputy town manager and other roles.

== Education ==
The town is mostly served by the Lewisville Independent School District. the western portion of Flower Mound is divided between the Argyle, Denton and Northwest Independent School Districts and the portion of Flower Mound that falls into Tarrant County is in the Grapevine-Colleyville Independent School District.

The town is home to three separate high schools, Edward S. Marcus High School, Flower Mound High School, (both part of the Lewisville district) and Argyle ISDs new Argyle High School campus.

Private schools in the town include such educational facilities as:

- Coram Deo Academy
- Lewisville Christian School
- Grace Christian Academy
- Temple Christian Academy

ResponsiveEd, the Lewisville-based charter school operator, operates a Founders Classical Academy in Flower Mound.

North Central Texas College has a community college branch campus within Parker Square in the town of Flower Mound. Midwestern State University has a branch facility, in conjunction with NCTC in the Parker Square location, which will offer master's degree programs amongst other services.

== Infrastructure ==
=== Transportation ===
At the western edge of the town, U.S. Route 377 extends north–south parallel to Interstate 35W towards Denton and Fort Worth. Two of the major thoroughfares in the town of Flower Mound are farm-to-market roads: FM 1171, known in Flower Mound as the Cross Timbers Road, which runs east–west across the entire town towards Interstate 35E to the east and Interstate 35W to the west. FM 2499 (which is known locally as Long Prairie) runs north–south and furnishes access to State Highway 121 and Interstate 635, north of DFW Airport.

In the June 2012, the members of the Flower Mound Town Council approved a plan to develop and regulate a series of various bike lanes around the town.

In the year 2012, the National Motorists Association released a poll listing Flower Mound as the "worst speed trap city" in North America with a population of over 50,002. Locals say it is not one anymore.

== Notable people ==
- Kennedy Baker
- Chris Brown, hockey player
- Ryan Cabrera, singer
- Colleen Clinkenbeard
- Brandon Gill, U.S. representative
- James Hanna
- Sarah Huffman, professional soccer player
- Logan Ireland, U.S. Air Force special agent
- Brandon Jefferson, professional basketball player
- Moira Kelly
- Samuel LeComte
- Emma Malabuyo
- Jane Nelson
- Hayley Orrantia
- Ryan Pace
- Rod Pampling, professional golfer
- Tan Parker
- Colin Poche, MLB pitcher
- Chris Sanders, quarterback
- Brighton Sharbino
- Marcus Smart, NBA Player for the Houston Rockets
- Kaden Smith
- Paul Stankowski
- Nick Stephens

== General references ==
=== Academic articles ===
- Head, Jordan (1998). "A New Species of Basal Hadrosaurid (Dinosauria, Ornithischia) from the Cenomanian of Texas". Journal of Vertebrate Paleontology. 18 (4): 713–738. Bibcode:1998JVPal..18..718H. doi:10.1080/02724634.1998.10011101.
- Jordan, Terry (October 1976). "Forest Folk, Prairie Folk: Rural Religious Culture in North Texas". The Southwestern Historical Quarterly. 80 (2): 135–162. JSTOR 30236822.
- Maxwell, Billie Ann (2009). "Texas Tug of War: A Survey of Urban Drilling and the Issues an Operator Will Face". Texas Journal of Oil, Gas, & Energy Law. 4: 337. "Texas confers broader authority to home rule cities than general law cities to regulate oil and gas activities within its jurisdiction. Examples of home rule cities include Fort Worth and Flower Mound."
- Welch, Terrence S. (2007). "Containing Urban Sprawl: Is Reinvigoration of Home Rule the Answer?" (PDF). Vermont Journal of Environmental Law. 9 (2): 131–153. JSTOR vermjenvilaw.9.2.131. Archived from the original (PDF) on April 8, 2013.

=== Books ===
- Bates, Edward (1918). History and Reminiscences of Denton County. Denton, Texas: McNitzky Printing Company. LCCN 19004337. OCLC 2133818.
- Bowman, Alton (December 1, 2004). The Flower Mound, Flower Mound, Texas: A History and Field Guide to the Flowers and Grasses (Softcover ed.). Virginia Beach, Virginia: Donning Company Publishers. ISBN 9781578642908. OCLC 56591979.
- Cannon, Bill (2004). "Forgotten Footnotes to Texas History". Texas: Land of Legend and Lore. Taylor Trade Publications. ISBN 9781556229497. OCLC 54454988.
- Flower Mound Historical Commission (April 1995). Ross, Elwood; Strobel, Jack; Bradford, Bill; Johns, Helen (eds.). Sweet Flower Mound Land. Andre Gerault, consultant; Doyle Ferguson, pictures; Frankie Spralbary, research. Wolfe City, Texas: Henington Publishing Company. LCCN 95204319. OCLC 33028214. OL 909524M.
- Hervey, Hollace (2002). Historic Denton County: An Illustrated History. San Antonio, Texas: Historical Pub Network. ISBN 978-1-893619-07-4. LCCN 2002101353. OCLC 52948987. OL 3572319M.
- Kilborn, Peter (July 7, 2009). Next Stop, Reloville: Life Inside America's New Rootless Professional Class. Macmillan. ISBN 9780805083088.
- Rogers, James Lloyd (May 1, 2002). "Expanding the University". The Story of North Texas: From Texas Normal College, 1890, to the University of North Texas System, 2001. University of North Texas Press. ISBN 9781574411287. OCLC 49935959.
- Saxe, Allan (January 16, 2009). "Cities Defining their Future". In Maxwell, William Earl; Crain, Ernest; Santos, Adolfo (eds.). Texas Politics Today. Cengage Learning. ISBN 9780495570257. OCLC 237881512.
- Sperling, Bert; Sander, Peter (May 8, 2006). "Flower Mound, TX". Best Places to Raise Your Family: The Top 100 Affordable Communities in the U.S. John Wiley & Sons. ISBN 9780471746997. OCLC 68621941.
- Ramos, Mary G.; Plocheck, Robert, eds. (1995). "Home-Rule Cities". Texas Almanac, 1996–1997. The Dallas Morning News. pp. 512–515. ISSN 0363-4248. OCLC 2418737.

=== Magazine articles ===
- "Best Places to Live 2010". Money. Flower Mound, TX. August 2010. Archived from the original on March 14, 2013.
- Communications, Emmis (October 1974). "'Perfect' is Too Strong a Word for Any Community, Even This One". Texas Monthly. 2 (10). ISSN 0148-7736.
- West, Richard (February 1976). Broyles, William (ed.). "Bum Steer Awards 1976". Texas Monthly. 4 (2): 71–79. ISSN 0148-7736.

=== Maps ===
- Texas County Map Book (PDF) (Map) (2010 ed.). 1:120,000. Cartography by Transportation Planning and Programming Division. Texas Department of Transportation. 2010. p. 451.
- Natural Subregions of Texas (PDF) (Map). Cartography by Texas Natural Resources Information System. Texas Parks and Wildlife Department. 2009.

=== Newspaper articles ===
- Ackerman, Stefanie (September 26, 2006). "Doc Honored for Service to Flower Mound -- William Wilkerson Served as Second Mayor FM". Flower Mound Leader.
- Brown, Steve (April 17, 2013a). "Groundbreaking Set for First Phase of $1 Billion Flower Mound Project". The Dallas Morning News. Archived from the original on July 22, 2013.
- ——— (August 13, 2013b). "Groundbreaking for Long Delayed Flower Mound Mixed-use Project This Week". The Dallas Morning News. Archived from the original on August 20, 2013.
- Carlisle, Candace (February 23, 2012a). "Plans for $1B Flower Mound Lakeside Project Unveiled". Dallas Business Journal. American City Business Journals.
- ——— (October 29, 2012b). "California Investment Group Buys Tract in Flower Mound". Dallas Business Journal. American City Business Journals.
- Estridge, Holli (April 9, 2006). "Partners Plot Future of Canyon Falls Project". Dallas Business Journal. American City Business Journals.
- Hundley, Wendy (July 10, 2010). "Flower Mound Gas Drilling Plan Pits Property Rights Against Safety Concerns". The Dallas Morning News.
- ——— (January 10, 2012a). "Fire on Flower Mound Expected to Spark Profusion of Wildflowers". The Dallas Morning News.
- ——— (November 20, 2012b). "Lakeside DFW Approved as Flower Mound's First Mixed-use Project". The Dallas Morning News.
- Pry, Lyn Rejahl (April 7, 2013a). "Flower Mound Council Candidates Talk SMARTGrowth". Cross Timbers Gazette. Flower Mound, Texas. Archived from the original on April 8, 2013.
- ——— (April 8, 2013b). "SMARTGrowth and the LISD". Cross Timbers Gazette. Flower Mound, Texas. Archived from the original on June 25, 2014.
- ——— (August 19, 2013c). "Flower Mound Voters to Decide Fate of River Walk Improvements". Cross Timbers Gazette. Flower Mound, Texas. Archived from the original on October 21, 2013.
- Roark, Chris (August 23, 2008). "Flower Mound: Celebration of Life Sunday for Fallen Soldier". Flower Mound Leader.
- ——— (January 7, 2011). "Flower Mound Welcomes NCTC". Flower Mound Leader.
- ——— (March 21, 2012a). "Council Argues Over Lakeside DFW Financial Disclosure". Flower Mound Leader.
- ——— (June 20, 2012b). "Council OK's Bike Lane Plan, Land Tracking System". Flower Mound Leader.
- ——— (April 16, 2013). "Lakeside DFW in Partnership with Event Planner".
- Taylor, Linda (November 24, 2006). "Mixed-use Possible Solution for Denton Creek District". Flower Mound Leader.

=== Reports ===
- Cornyn, John; Taylor, Andy; Ervin, Clark Kent; Robinson, Elizabeth; Oltrogge, Kymberly (1999). Texas Attorney General Opinion (Legal opinion). Texas Attorney-General's Office. JC-142. "A home-rule municipality may implement a growth-management plan that apportions, or 'caps', the number of building permits the municipality will issue in a given time period even in the absence of an emergency."
- Flower Mound New Town (PDF) (Executive summary). December 22, 1970. Archived from the original (PDF) on August 24, 2014.
- Marks, George C. (1980). Soil Survey of Denton County, Texas (Soil survey).
- O'Flinn, Larry; Hudson, Barry; Alves, Tom; Thompson, Janel; Hadden, Eric (May 3, 2010). Town of Flower Mound Parks and Trails Master Plan Update (PDF) (Master plan). Graphic design by Jay Tobias. Dunaway Associates.
- ———; et al. (2012). Parks and Trails Plan (PDF) (Master plan update). Town of Flower Mound.
- Springer, Chuck (2012). Comprehensive Annual Financial Report for the Fiscal Year Ended September 30, 2011 (PDF) (Financial report).
- Report of the Board of Home Missions of the Presbyterian Church of the United States of America (Annual report) (One Hundred Eighteenth ed.). Philadelphia. May 20, 1920. p. 86.
- Walker, Jacilyn G. (1976). Bikeways for Flower Mound: A Proposed System of Recreational and Commuter Bikeways for the Town of Flower Mound, Texas (Consultant analysis). University of Texas at Arlington: Institute for Urban Studies.

=== Websites ===
- Bowman, John (August 28, 2012). "Nationwide Poll Reveals Top U.S. and Canadian Speed Traps" (PDF) (Press release). National Motorists Association. Archived from the original (PDF) on October 19, 2012.
- "Flower Mound". LoneStarDinosaurs.org. Fort Worth Museum of Science and History. Archived from the original on December 19, 2010.
- "Flower Mound (town), Texas". United States Census Bureau. January 31, 2012. Archived from the original on June 23, 2012.
- Greene, A.C. (1973). Cochran, Mike (ed.). "A Brief History of Flower Mound". Dentonhistory.net.
- Hawes, Chris (January 22, 2010). "Intense, Emotional Debate Over Gas Drilling in Flower Mound". WFAA. Archived from the original on March 1, 2012.
- Minor, David (2011). "Flower Mound, TX". Texas State Historical Association. Archived from the original on July 15, 2011.
- Payne, Minnie (June 10, 2008). "Flower Mound Opens Doors to New Community Activity Center Saturday, with Grand Opening June 21". PegasusNews.com. Archived from the original on August 20, 2014.
- Raghavan, Divya (April 29, 2013). "The 100K Club: America's Highest-Earning Cities". NerdWallet.com. Archived from the original on June 21, 2013.
- "Selected Economic Characteristics — 2009–2011 American Community Survey 3-Year Estimates". American Fact Finder. United States Census Bureau. Income and Benefits.
- "Denton County Elections Official Results - 2012 General Election November 6, 2012". Clarity e-Election Platform. 2012.
- "Population of Texas Cities and Towns Sorted by County". The County Information Project Texas Association of Counties. Archived from the original on May 7, 2015.
- "SMARTGrowth". Flower-Mound.com. Town of Flower Mound. 2012.
- "Town Council". Flower-Mound.com. Town of Flower Mound. 2012. Archived from the original on June 6, 2012.
