= If You Were Mine =

If You Were Mine may refer to:

- "If You Were Mine", a song by Billie Holiday, written by Matty Malneck and Johnny Mercer, 1935
- "If You Were Mine", a song by Mario Lanza, written by Bob Merrill, 1953
- "If You Were Mine" (Level 42 song), 1991
- "If You Were Mine", a song by Bed & Breakfast, 1995
- "If You Were Mine" (Marcos Hernandez song), 2005
- "If You Were Mine", a song by Jessica Simpson from her 2006 album A Public Affair
- "If You Were Mine", a song by Boyzone from their 1995 album Said and Done
