= Marcos Hernández =

Marcos Hernández may refer to:

- Marcos Hernández (swimmer) (born 1978), Cuban former freestyle swimmer
- Marcos Hernandez (singer) (born 1982), American singer
