= Magic City (MC Magic album) =

Studio album by MC Magic
- Released: May 9, 2006
- Recorded: 2006
- Studio: Nastyboy Studio
- Genre: Hip hop
- Length: 1:06:50
- Label: Nastyboy Records
- Producer: Angel Lopez; Big Nasty; Damizza; Destiny The Bandit; MC Magic; Nan Dogg; Roc A Dolla Beats

MC Magic chronology
NB Ridaz.com (2004)	Magic City (2006)	Princess/Princesa (2008)

Magic City is the second solo studio album by MC Magic. It was released on May 9, 2006 via Nastyboy Records. Recording sessions took place at Nastyboy Studio. Production was handled by Roc A Dolla Beats, Angel Lopez, Big Nasty, Damizza, Destiny The Bandit, Nan Dogg, and MC Magic himself. It features guest appearances from Big Gemini, Chingo Bling, DJ Kane, Don Cisco, Guerilla Black, Herb G., Jay Tee, Junebug Slim, JX3, Kid Brown, Krystal Melody, Marcos Hernandez, Nichole, Sly, True Breed and Zig Zag. The album peaked at number 155 on the Billboard 200, number 60 on the Top R&B/Hip-Hop Albums and topped the Heatseekers Albums charts in the United States.

== Track listing ==
#	Title	Featured guest	Length
1	Intro		1:53
2	Ride It Out	Big Gemini, Chingo Bling and Guerilla Black	4:57
3	All My Life	Nichole & Angel Lopez	3:43
4	DJ Kane	DJ Kane	0:31
5	Sexy Lady	DJ Kane	3:54
6	Trippin	Don Cisco and Jay Tee	3:44
7	Lies	Krystal Melody	3:41
8	Sin Ti	Nichole	3:25
9	Tenderoni	Marcos Hernandez and JX3	3:48
10	So Fly Part 2	Big Gemini	3:26
11	Art Laboe		0:29
12	Be with U	Zig Zag and Herb G.	4:10
13	Passion	Nichole	2:52
14	Be My Lady	Don Cisco	3:46
15	Tell Me	True Breed and Kid Brown	3:50
16	Lets Pretend	Sly	4:39
17	Beautiful	Zig Zag	3:16
18	Magic Custom CDs		1:28
19	Crazy for You	Big Gemini	3:33
20	Slow Jam	Junebug Slim, Jay Tee and Zig Zag	4:15
21	Sunday Night Slow Jams Theme		1:30

== Charts ==
Chart (2006)	Peak position
US Billboard 200	155
US Top R&B/Hip-Hop Albums (Billboard)	60
US Heatseekers Albums (Billboard)	1
