= Princess/Princesa =

EP by MC Magic
- Released: March 18, 2008
- Recorded: 2007
- Genre: Latin pop, Hip hop, R&B
- Length: 35:42
- Label: Nastyboy Records

MC Magic chronology
Magic City (2006)	Princess/Princesa (2008)	Magic City Part 2 (2008)

Princess/Princesa is an EP and third CD by MC Magic.

== Track listing ==
From allmusic.com:

1. Princess - 3:05
2. Princesa - 3:05
3. Magic City Part 2 (Snippet) - 3:30
4. Sin Ti (Remix) (featuring Sophia Maria) - 3:30
5. Cruzin' (Remix) (featuring Butch Cassidy, Damizza and Down) - 4:07
6. Need You in My Life (featuring Mal Hablado) - 3:54
7. Sexy Lady (Remix) (featuring DJ Kane) - 4:20
8. Somebody Like You (featuring Lil Tweety) - 4:02
9. Princess (Instrumental) - 3:04
10. Princess (Acappella) - 3:05
