= Magic City Part 2 =

Studio album by MC Magic
- Released: May 6, 2008
- Recorded: 2006–2008
- Genre: Latin pop, hip hop, R&B
- Length: 1:08:25
- Label: Nastyboy Records/Thump Records

MC Magic chronology
Princess/Princesa (2008)	Magic City Part 2 (2008)

Magic City Part 2 is the fourth solo album by MC Magic.

== Track listing ==
#	Title	Featured guest	Length
1	Intro		0:12
2	Hottest City in the World	Marcus Elliott, True Breed and Roc a Dolla	4:18
3	Girl I Love You	Zig Zag	3:41
4	Anything for You	Tiffany Dunn	3:39
5	Lil Mama	Big Gemini and Chingo Bling	4:05
6	Princesa		3:00
7	Dancer	Too $hort, C-Note and AZ Prince	4:34
8	What Is Love	Tiffany Dunn	3:15
9	So Special	Nichole and Baby Bash	3:29
10	You Stole My Heart	DJ Kane	3:56
11	The Only One	Sophia Maria	3:11
12	Princess		3:00
13	Superstar	Roger Troutman and True Breed	4:34
14	Hustla	Kid Brown and Big D	4:27
15	Magic Custom CD		2:03
16	Guera	Nichole	4:13
17	Curse & Blessing	Zig Zag	4:01
18	Dancer (Remix)	Too $hort, C-Note and Kid Brown	4:27
19	Father	MC Blvd	4:19
