= I Know You Want Me (Nastyboy Klick and CeCe Peniston song) =

Single by Nastyboy Klick and CeCe Peniston

from the album Desert Funk Soundtrack
- Released: April 1998
- Studio: Magics Studio
- Length: 5:16 (album version)
- Label: Nastyboy; Upstairs
- Producers: M.C. Magic; Dave Knauer (additional)

CeCe Peniston singles chronology
"Somebody Else's Guy" (1998)	"I Know You Want Me" (1998)	"Nobody Else" (1998)

"I Know You Want Me" is a song by Nastyboy Klick a.k.a. NBK (later known as NB Ridaz), and CeCe Peniston. It was released as a single in 1998. Ray Riendeau, most known for his work with singer Rob Halford (from heavy metal band Judas Priest), performed bass on the song.

The song is included on the various artists' compilation M.C. Magic Presents Desert Funk Soundtrack, which was produced by Phoenix-based artist Marcus Cardenas on his own Nastyboy Records, and featured an additional track performed by Peniston (the Latino hip-hop ballad "When I'm with You"). It also served as the lead single of NBK's second full-length album Tha Second Coming, released later in 1998 on Upstairs Records.

On April 18, "I Know You Want Me" peaked at number nine on the U.S. Billboard Bubbling Under Hot 100 R&B Singles chart.

== Credits and personnel ==
- Nastyboy Klick – lead vocals
- CeCe Peniston – backing vocals
- Marcus Cardenas (alias M.C. Magic) – writer, producer, mixer
- Daniel Salas – writer
- Ricardo Martinez – writer
- Dave Knauer – additional producer, mixer
- Ray Riendeau – bass guitar
- John Lopez – executive producer
- Magics Studio – recording studio
- Anthem Studio – mixer

== Charts ==
Chart (1998)	Peak position
US Billboard Bubbling Under R&B/Hip-Hop Singles	9
