= Don't Worry (album) =

Studio album by MC Magic
- Released: May 23, 1995
- Recorded: 1994–1995
- Genre: Latin pop, hip hop, R&B
- Length: 49:59
- Label: Nastyboy Records
- Producer: Dre Lesean of the Orphanz

MC Magic chronology
Don't Worry (1995)	Desert Funk Soundtrack (1998)

Don't Worry is MC Magic's debut full-length album.

== Track listing ==
1. "illetyoudoit-2-me" - 4:35
2. "Summertime" - 4:08
3. "It's OK" - 4:21
4. "Lost in Love" - 4:09
5. "Don't Worry" - 3:26
6. "Pandilleros" - 0:58
7. "Girl I Love You" - 4:33
8. "Comin Out the PHX" - 4:08
9. "Back in the Day" - 4:42
10. "Here It Comes" - 3:13
11. "Jam" - 3:37
12. "Excited" - 3:49
13. "Don't Worry Remix" - 4:44
14. "Dre's Groove" - 4:34
