= Allan Saxe Field =

Sports stadium in Arlington, Texas

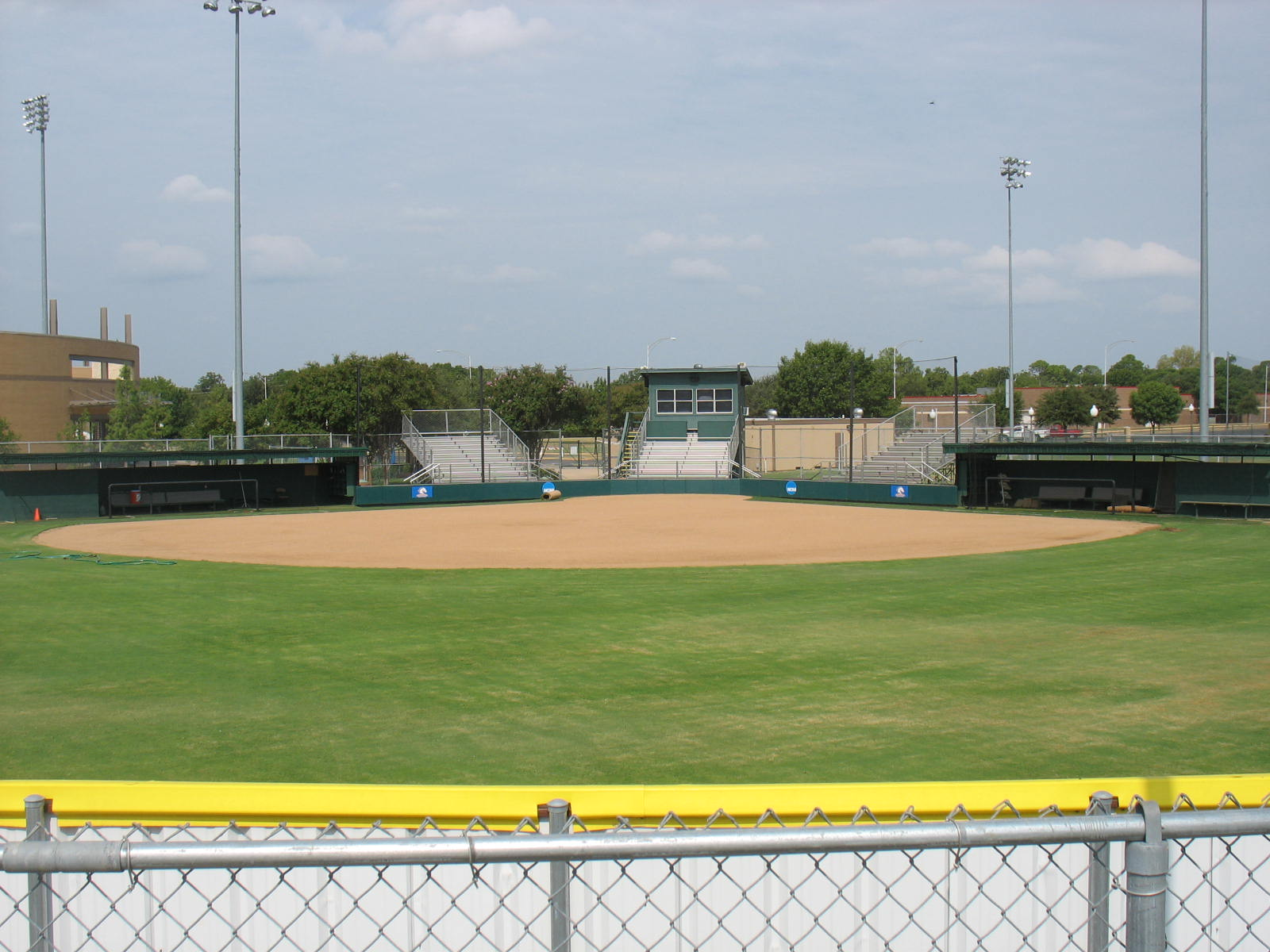
- Allan Saxe Field prior to renovation
- Interactive map of Allan Saxe Field
- Address: 1400 Maverick; Arlington, TX 76013
- Location: S. Fielder Rd. and W. Park Row Dr. Arlington, Texas
- Coordinates: 32°43′21″N 97°07′46″W
- Owner: University of Texas at Arlington
- Operator: University of Texas at Arlington
- Capacity: Current: 622; Before 2015: 250
- Record attendance: 702 (March 12, 2016 vs Samford University)
- Field size: Left Field: 190 ft. Center Field: 215 ft. Right Field: 190 ft. (Estimated)

Construction
- Opened: 1974
- Renovated: 1993, 2014–15

Tenant
- Texas–Arlington Mavericks softball

Allan Saxe Field is the home of the Texas–Arlington Mavericks softball team located in Arlington, Texas. As a result of a complete reconstruction in 2014–15, the stadium currently has a capacity of 622. Prior to the renovation, the softball facility had a seating capacity of 250. Adjacent to Clay Gould Ballpark, the stadium is located at the intersection of W. Park Row Drive and Fielder Road.

== Features ==
Allan Saxe Field consists of a combination of bleacher and chairback seating for 622 fans as a result of the complete stadium reconstruction following the 2014 season.

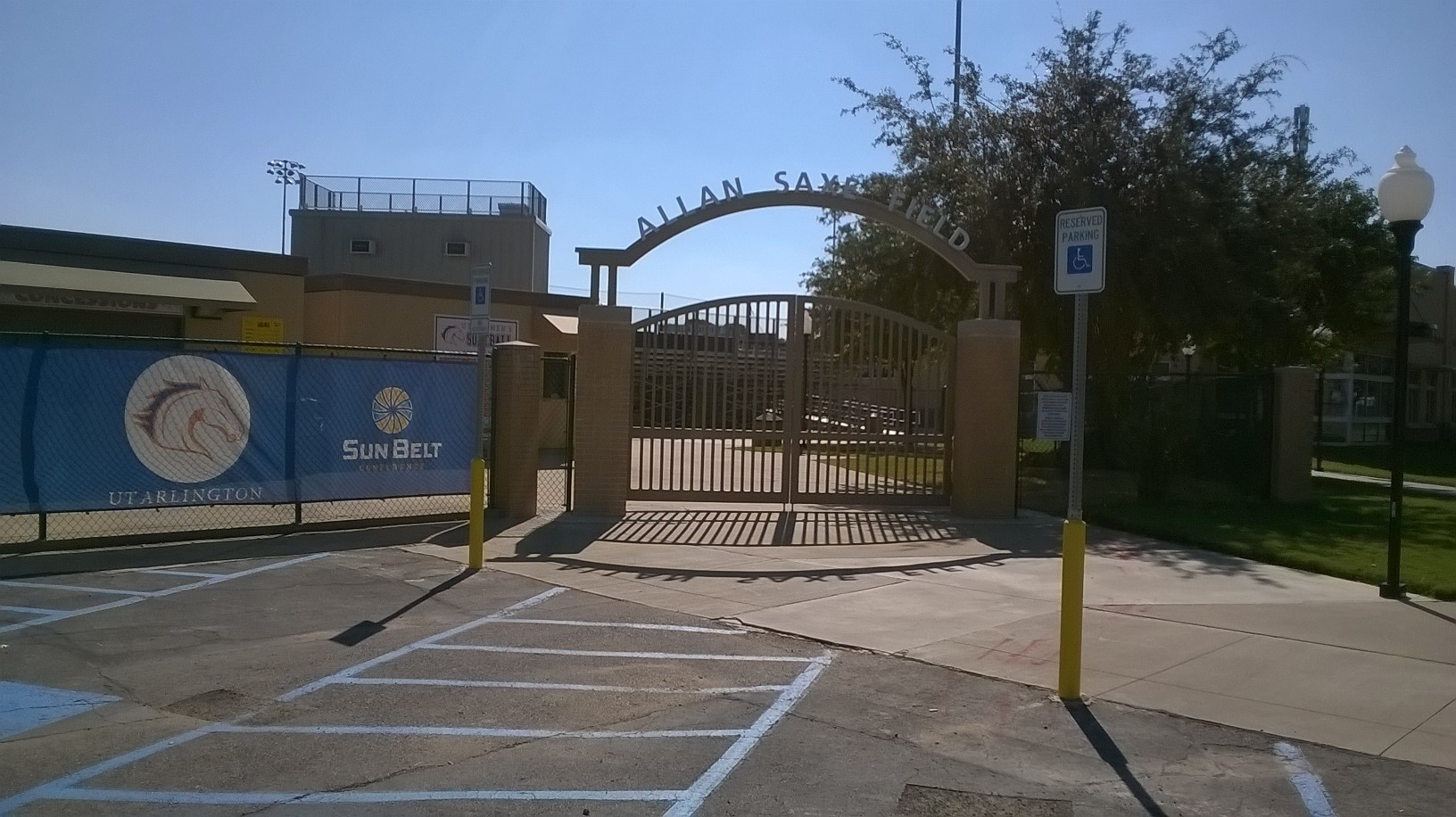
The main entryway to Allan Saxe Field after the venue was rebuilt prior to the 2015 season.

The playing field is a natural grass surface while foul territory is an artificial turf. Each dugout is covered and looks out onto the dirt infield. There are batting cages and bullpens down each respective team's foul line. Lights make night games possible and a 10-foot-high, 10-inning scoreboard sits beyond the center field fence.

The first base side is the home team's dugout, which connects to the newly added clubhouse. Immediately south of the clubhouse sits the indoor practice facility.

Allan Saxe Field features several amenities for the fans including chair-back seats behind home plate, a sound system for music and public address announcements along with a concession stand and restroom facilities near the entrance.

== History and Renovations ==
Completed in 1974 as part of the Arlington Athletic Center on the southwesternmost portion of the UT-Arlington campus, the softball field was built in conjunction with the baseball stadium, which would later be known as Clay Gould Ballpark.

The softball venue was renamed after popular Professor Allan Saxe's gifts made renovations possible in 1993. Professor Saxe also contributed to renovations for UTA's baseball stadium, and it was renamed Allan Saxe Stadium, before another renaming would give the baseball facility its current name.

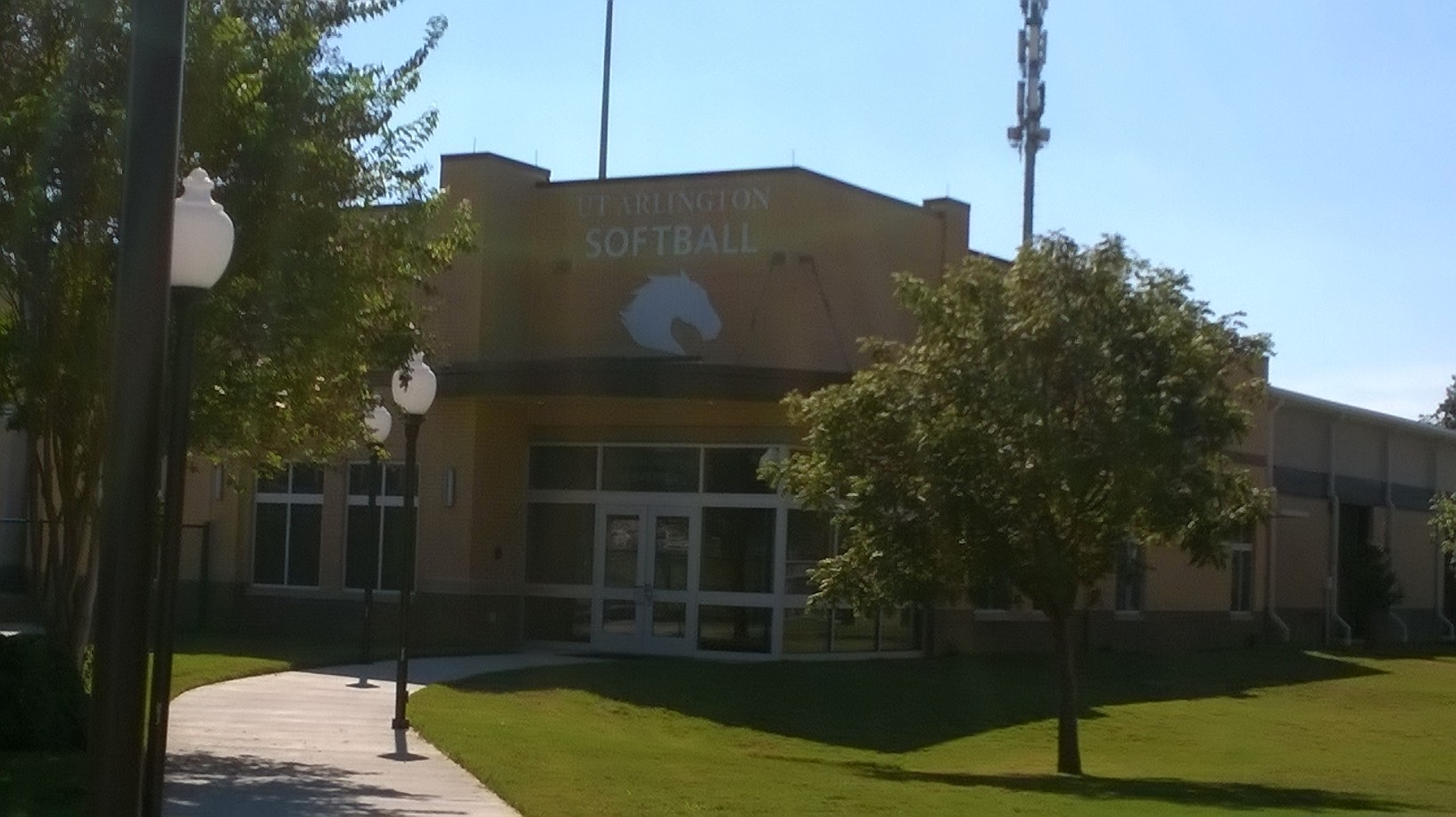
The new clubhouse at Allan Saxe Field, completed prior to the 2015 season

Construction of an indoor practice facility was started and completed during the off-season prior to the 2013 season. The addition was part of a $1.95 million project to construct a similar space for both the softball field and baseball stadium, allowing practices to occur during inclement weather for both teams at their respective venue. The 3,500-square-foot (330 m^{2}) indoor softball facility contains interchangeable batting cages, pitching area and the ability for an open practice.

In August 2013, the UT System board of regents approved $5.5 million to continue renovations at the venue, as well as a similar expansion for Clay Gould Ballpark. Construction of the new clubhouse as well as a complete reconstruction of the stadium began following the 2014 season.

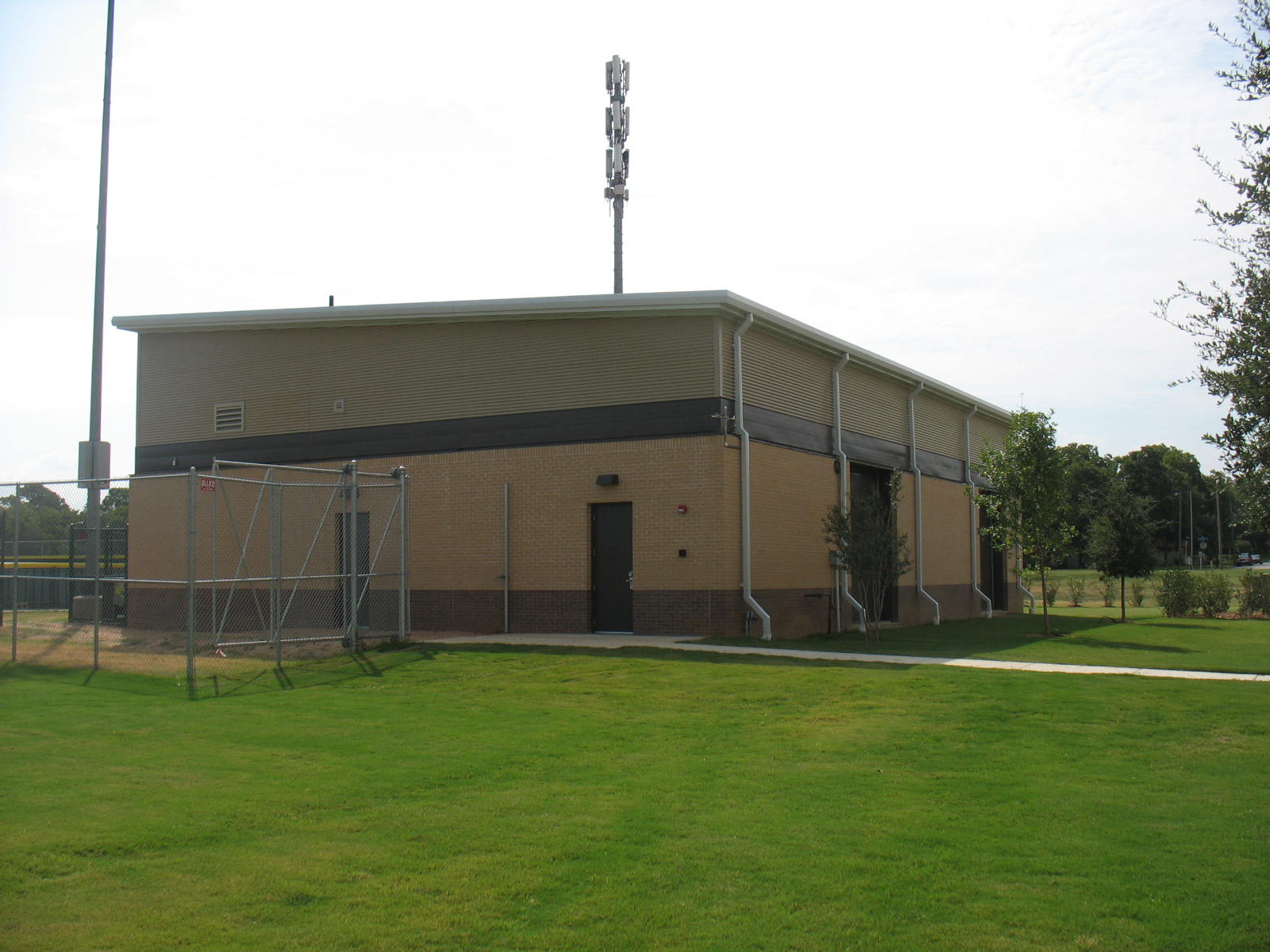
The indoor practice facility, prior to the addition of the clubhouse

The clubhouse is located on the first base side, near the indoor practice facility. Completed prior to the 2015 season, it is an estimated 6,300 square feet (590 m^{2}) of interior space and includes locker rooms, player lounge, coaches offices and locker rooms, training rooms, equipment and laundry rooms, mud room and welcome lobby.

The stadium reconstruction included a completely scraping and rebuild of the playing field, field irrigation system replacement, new dugouts, new bullpens, new press box with seating for 15, new outfield fencing, new bleacher seating increasing capacity to 622 as well as a grass berm for seating adjacent to the left field wall. The first game in the basically new stadium was played on February 12, 2015 against the Incarnate Word Cardinals of the Southland Conference, a 13–4 Maverick victory. A ribbon cutting ceremony for the new clubhouse was held on March 21, 2015.

Further renovations are in the planning phase, as the athletic department devised a master plan for the venue, which include expanding the seating capacity to just over 1,000, press box additions and expansions and a UTA store.

== Program History ==
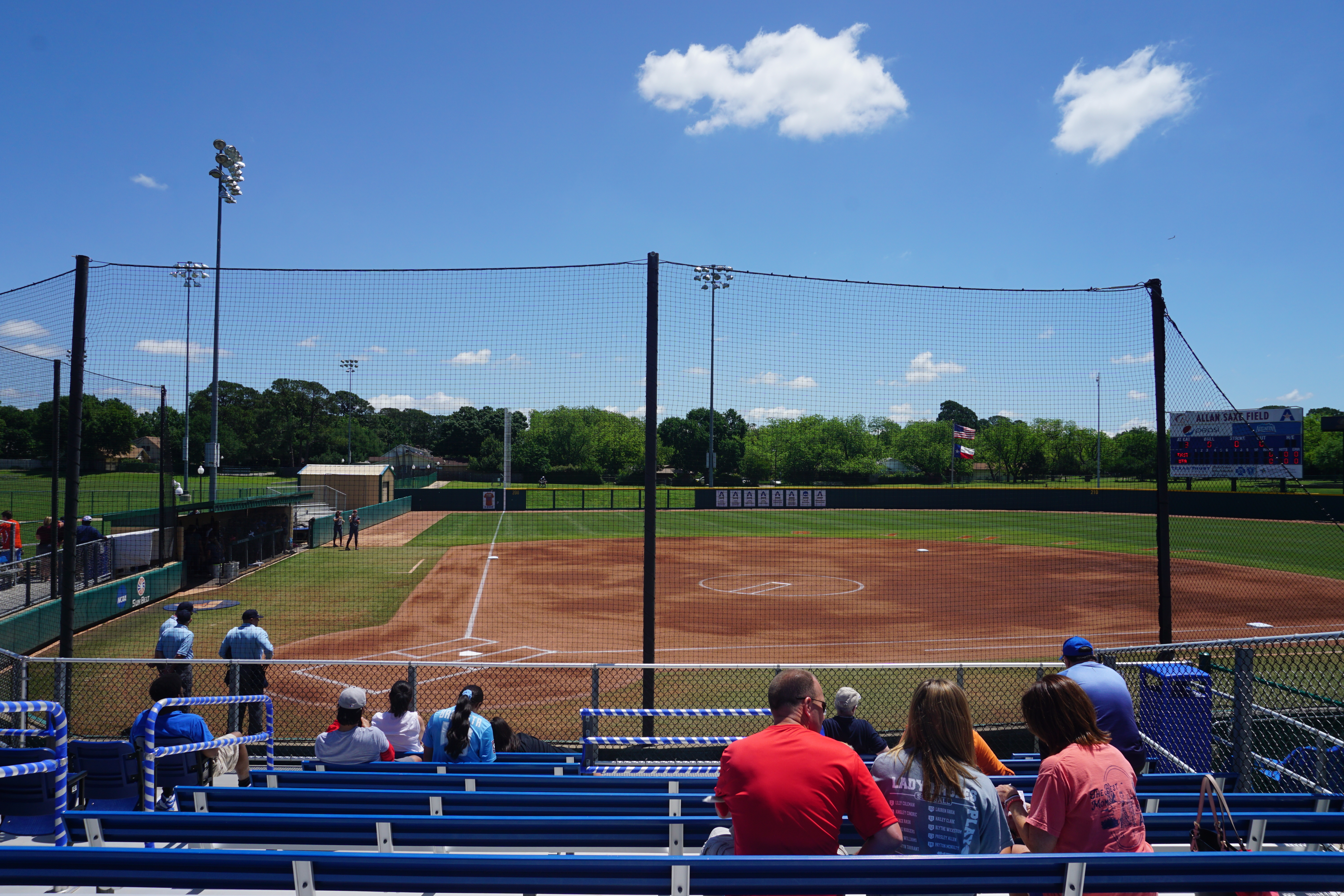
Allan Saxe Field during the 2019 season

Allan Saxe Field provides the Mavericks with a nice home field advantage, as they have a home record of 515–376, for a winning percentage of .578 (as of the end of the 2024 season).

Allan Saxe Field has hosted numerous big name opponents, including the Big XII's Baylor Bears, Kansas State Wildcats, University of Texas Longhorns and Texas Tech Red Raiders, the SEC's Arkansas Razorbacks, Mississippi Rebels and Texas A&M Aggies, the B1G's Illinois Fighting Illini, the Pac-12's Oregon Ducks, the ACC's Pittsburgh Panthers and the AAC's Houston Cougars.

UTA has played the Texas State Bobcats the most at Allan Saxe Field, with 63 games played. The Mavericks are 35–28 in those games. The Mavericks and Bobcats were conference rivals from 1988 to 2022, despite both squads belonging to three conferences. Louisiana-Monroe is the second most visited team, lining up against UTA 60 times, followed by Sam Houston, 42, Stephen F. Austin, 41, and Northwestern State, 34. UTA once again joined Louisiana-Monroe in the Sun Belt Conference, then SFA and Sam Houston in the Western Athletic Conference. All five members on the list were members of the Southland at one time or another.

Allan Saxe Field was home to the 1983, 1986, 1989, 2003 and 2007 Southland Conference regular season champions and the 2003 Southland Conference tournament champions.

A sellout crowd of 702 set a new attendance record on March 12, 2016 when Samford visited. The previous record of 474 was set against the UT Longhorns on March 11, 2010 when stadium capacity was 250. In 2016, Allan Saxe also drew crowds of 622, 522 and 512 that would have set the record had it occurred in any year prior. On April 16, 2019, the record was broken again when 782 fans saw the Mavericks host the 11th ranked Longhorns. While the season was suspended in March, 2020 set a record for average attendance when Allan Saxe Field averaged 467 fans per game after 14 games were completed. The previous record of 361 was set a year prior in 2019 (25 games), also the last full season with open gates and full schedule. Attendance records fell again during the 2023 season, as a new crowd of 810 came to Allan Saxe Field to view the Mavericks versus the Longhorns. the 417 average was the most for a full season, despite the 22-29 overall record.
