= Greatest Hits (NB Ridaz album) =

Greatest hits album by NB Ridaz
- Released: July 15, 2008
- Genre: R&B, Latin pop
- Length: 45:52
- Label: Upstairs Records

NB Ridaz chronology
NB Ridaz.com (2004)	Greatest Hits (2008)

Greatest Hits is a greatest hits album and also a fourth album by NB Ridaz. It was released on July 15, 2008.

== Track listing ==
1. "So Fly" (produced by Big Fenix & Dj 2Swift)
2. "Pretty Girl"
3. "Runaway"
4. "Lost in Love"
5. "4-Ever"
6. "Tu Eres"
7. "Notice Me"
8. "Until I Die"
9. "Radio Song"
10. "A Perfect Man"
11. "Wishin"
