= Texas Journal of Oil, Gas, and Energy Law =

The Texas Journal of Oil, Gas, and Energy Law (TJOGEL) is a student-edited and produced law review published by the University of Texas School of Law. It is the only entirely student-edited journal in the country that focuses on promoting scholarship in the energy legal field.

== Overview ==
The Texas Journal of Oil, Gas, and Energy Law was founded in the summer of 2005. It published its first issue with the help of over sixty students on April 10, 2006. TJOGEL publishes two issues per academic year, one in the fall and one in the spring semester. Each issue contains articles by scholars and energy industry practitioners, student notes, and recent developments in international, United States, and Texas energy law. To date, TJOGEL is in its tenth year and has published over 3,800 pages of legal scholarship. Proper citation for the Journal is Tex. J. Oil Gas & Energy L.

== Activities ==
Every spring, TJOGEL hosts a two-day continuing legal education symposium covering different topics in energy law. In addition to the symposium, TJOGEL hosts a banquet to announce the recipient of the Ernest E. Smith Lifetime Achievement Award. This award is given to a distinguished attorney who has made significant contributions to the oil, gas, and energy industry.

== Recognition ==
The journal has been cited in the Ninth Circuit Court of Appeals as well as the Texas Supreme Court and the Pennsylvania Supreme Court.

== See also ==
- Oil, Gas and Energy Law
