= NB Ridaz.com =

Studio album by NB Ridaz
- Released: April 6, 2004
- Genre: R&B, Latin pop
- Label: Upstairs Records

NB Ridaz chronology
Invasion (Upstairs) (2001)	NB Ridaz.com (2004)	Greatest Hits (2008)

NB Ridaz.com is the third studio album by NB Ridaz. It was released on April 6, 2004.

== Track listing ==
1. "Intro"
2. "U Got Me Hot"
3. "Cho. n.Low #1"
4. "Pretty Girl"
5. "So Fly"(Produced by Dj2Swift & Big Fenix)
6. "Tu Eres"
7. "Cho. n.Low #2"
8. "Wishin" (Produced by The Orphanz)
9. "Playaz"
10. "4-Ever"
11. "Notice Me"
12. "Until I Die"
13. "Sunshine"
14. "Lil Ridaz"
15. "Bouce If U Wanna"
16. "Cho. n.Low #3"
17. "Southwest Ridaz"
18. "Magic's Custom CD's"
19. "Guess Who's Back"
20. "Cho. n.Low #4"
