= If You Were Mine (Marcos Hernandez song) =

Single by Marcos Hernandez

from the album C About Me
- Released: 2005
- Genre: Pop, R&B
- Length: 3:39
- Label: TVT
- Songwriter(s): Eliot Sloan, Joseph Carrier, David Corey
- Producer(s): Eliot Sloan, Robi Menace, Wayne Stallings

Marcos Hernandez singles chronology
"If You Were Mine" (2005)	"If I'd Known" (2005)

"If You Were Mine" is a song by American recording artist Marcos Hernandez. It was written by Joseph Carrier, David Corey and Eliot Sloan and released as the first single from the album, C About Me (2005).

== Background ==
"If You Were Mine" was written by Joseph Carrier, David Corey and Eliot Sloan, with the latter producing, along with Robi Menace and Wayne Stallings.

== Chart performance ==
"If You Were Mine" debuted on the US Billboard Hot 100 at number 89. By its sixth week, it had already peaked at number 78 and began descending down the charts. It landed at number 96 by its seventh week and fell off the charts after its eighth week. In the UK, the song debuted at number 41 and fell off the charts the following week. "If You Were Mine" had charted the highest in New Zealand. It peaked at number 16 on its fourth week and spent seven weeks on the charts altogether.

== Track listing ==
UK iTunes extended play

- "If You Were Mine" (Groovefinder Full Vocal Mix) — 6:22
- "If You Were Mine" (Groovefinder's Get Closer Dub) — 6:46
- "If You Were Mine" (Ruff Diamond Remix) — 4:06

== Personnel ==
Credits adapted from the C About Me liner notes.

- Marcos Hernandez – lead vocals, background vocals
- Eliot Sloan – Songwriter, producer
- Robi Menace – producer
- Wayne Stallings – producer
- Hal Fitzgerald – mixing
- Ben Jackson – engineering
- Michael Havens – engineering

== Charts ==
Charts (2005)	Peak position
New Zealand (RIANZ)	16
UK Singles (The Official Charts Company)	41
US Billboard Hot 100	78

== Release history ==
Region	Date	Label	Format	Catalogue
United Kingdom	January 6, 2006	TVT Records	CD single (Import)	B000BT5DZW
United States	January 31, 2006	TVT Records	CD single (Import)	B000DXS7L8
