= The First Chapter (Nastyboy Klick album) =

Studio album by Nastyboy Klick
- Released: August 5, 1997
- Genre: R&B, Latin pop
- Length: 42:48
- Label: Island Def Jam

Nastyboy Klick chronology
The First Chapter (1997)	Desert Funk Soundtrack (1998)

The First Chapter is the first studio album by Nastyboy Klick. It was released on August 5, 1997.

MC Magic, founder of Nasty Boy Klick, was discovered in the summer of 1996 by radio personality, Kid Corona.

After a brief meeting with Magic, Corona decided to take a chance and play “Lost in Love” on his Tucson radio show. The song was an instant hit, and the phone lines went wild!

At first, Corona had gotten in trouble for playing an unknown song on the air. But, he was quickly forgiven due to the insane amount of requests. As a result of the songs success, MC Magic invited Kid Corona to appear as himself on their hit song “AZ Side.”

== Track listing ==
1. Intro
2. Down for Yours
3. Az Side
4. Keep It Bumpin
5. Life
6. Bookies Freestyle
7. Temptation
8. Summertime
9. How Many M.C.'s
10. Theresomethin
11. Constantly
12. Get Yo Back Up Off the Wall
