= Invasion (Nastyboy) =

Studio album by NB Ridaz
- Released: September 11, 2001
- Genre: R&B, Latin pop
- Label: Nastyboy Records

NB Ridaz chronology
| The Second Coming (1998) | Invasion (Nastyboy) (2001) | Invasion (Upstairs) (2001) |

Invasion (Nastyboy) is the first studio album by NB Ridaz. It was released on September 11, 2001.

== Track listing ==
1. "Intro"
2. "Ride with Us"
3. "I Wanna Luv-U"
4. "Mexicanos"
5. "Panties Droppin'"
6. "Runaway"
7. "Major Ways"
8. "Kid and Ruben"
9. "Girl"
10. "What Kind of Man"
11. "Dollar Bill"
12. "Party in Arizona" (Destiny remix)
13. "No Longer There"
14. "Bring It"
15. "Bounce Baby"
16. "Are U Still Down"
17. "Oh My Goodness"

== Invasion (Upstairs) ==
Invasion (Upstairs) is the second studio album by NB Ridaz. It was released on December 4, 2001, overlapping in content with Invasion (Nastyboy). The lead single entitled "Runaway" was re-added to radio stations in January 2002 following the December 2001 rerelease of "Invasion".

=== Track listing ===
1. "Intro"
2. "Ride with Us"
3. "I Wanna Luv U"
4. "Mexicanos"
5. "Panties Droppin'"
6. "Runaway"
7. "Major Ways"
8. "Kid and Ruben"
9. "Girl"
10. "What Kind of Man"
11. "Dollar Bill"
12. "Party in az 3" (Destiny remix)
13. "No Longer There"
14. "Bring It"
15. "Radio Song"
16. "Flyin'"
17. "M1 & D. Dogg"
