= Allan Saxe =

American political scientist (1939–2024)

- Born: February 1939; Oklahoma City, Oklahoma, U.S.
- Died: June 18, 2024 (aged 85); Arlington, Texas, U.S.
- Education: University of Oklahoma
- Occupation(s): Political scientist, author, academic, radio commentator, philanthropist
- Employer: University of Texas at Arlington
- Spouse: Ruthie Brock (m. 2018)

Allan Saxe (February 1939 – June 18, 2024) was an American political scientist, author, lecturer, radio commentator, philanthropist and academic. He was the professor emeritus of political science at the University of Texas at Arlington, where he started as a faculty member in 1965.

== Personal life ==
Saxe was born in February 1939 in Oklahoma City, Oklahoma. He earned his Ph.D. in political science at the University of Oklahoma in the year 1969. As a child, he was diagnosed with polio and remained bedridden for several months. The illness caused a lifelong case of mobility issues, panic attacks, vertigo and nausea.

In April 2018, Saxe married Ruthie Brock, his partner of 40 years.

In August 2020, Saxe disclosed that he had Parkinson's disease and was living comfortably in Arlington. He died on June 18, 2024, at the age of 85.

== Career ==
In 1965, Saxe was hired by Arlington State College to teach government courses during the summer semester. After the semester ended, he became a full-time faculty member of the university. He would continue to teach at the university until February 2019 when he retired due to health issues relating to post-polio syndrome.

Saxe published one book titled Politics of Arlington, Texas: An Era of Continuity and Growth and co-authored one other titled American Government: A Core Approach. He also published in several political journals and magazine articles.

Aside from writing and teaching, Saxe was also a radio political commentator, mainly contributing for programs on WBAP (AM). He also made some commentary contributions for CBS.

=== Philanthropy ===
Saxe's mother left him $500,000 upon her death which he gave away to charitable organizations. He has funded the Christmas lights in downtown Arlington, Texas, as well as paid for efforts to keep traffic flowing in the area for light viewing.

Landmarks throughout Arlington, Texas, are named after Saxe in honor of his generous giving. These include Allan Saxe Park, the Allan Saxe Dental Clinic, the Allan Saxe Field, and the Allan Saxe Parkway (the latter a tongue-in-cheek honor; the "Parkway" leads to the Arlington city landfill and was named after his critiques of city council actions).

Grants, loans and charities bear his name. The Allan Saxe NT Green Loan is a loan offered to students of the University of North Texas for unexpected expenses outside of tuition, fees and books. The Allan Saxe Disabled Student Scholarship is a scholarship for disabled students at the University of Texas at Arlington who excel academically. UNT lists the Ruth Brock and Allan Saxe Scholarship in Library Science as an available scholarship for students. Saxe donated $100,000 to have a 50-foot tall sculpture erected between AT&T Stadium and Rangers Ballpark in Arlington.

In August 2020, Saxe announced his pledge to donate $10,000 to homeless shelters across Arlington, Texas.

== Honors and awards ==
In 1972, Saxe won the UTA Chancellor's Council Award (formerly the Amoco Award). In 1986, 2007 and 2008, he was named to the Gertrude Golladay Memorial Award for Outstanding Teaching in the College of Liberal Arts.
