= NB Ridaz =

Hip hop group

- Origin: Phoenix, Arizona, U.S.
- Genre: Hip hop
- Years active: 1995–2006, 2011,2024
- Label: Ridazstyle ent
- Members: DOS Zig Zag
- Past members: MC Magic Sly DJ 2 Swift
- Website: https://www.ridazstyleent.com/

NB Ridaz is an American hip hop group from Phoenix, Arizona, formerly known as Nastyboy Klick (NBK). The group was active from 1995 to 2006, and again in 2011 and 2024. As Nastyboy Klick, they charted on the Billboard Hot 100 with singles including "Down for Yours" (1997) and "Lost in Love" (1998). After reforming as NB Ridaz, they released their debut album Invasion in 2001, followed by NBRidaz.com in 2004, which produced several charting singles including "So Fly", "Pretty Girl", and "Notice Me".

== Biography ==
=== Nastyboy Klick ===
MC Magic was a disc jockey from Avondale, Arizona. In 1991, he formed an independent record label, Nastyboy Records, gaining regional attention with the track "Lost in Love", which was later included on his 1995 debut album Don't Worry.

In 1997, MC Magic formed Nastyboy Klick, initially with six members: Magic, DOS, Ziggy, Sly, Mischief (Magic's 10-year-old son) and Bookie. Bookie left the group to pursue a solo project before NBK became successful.

In order to attract the attention of local radio stations, MC Magic contacted the management of Roger Troutman of Zapp and Roger, who agreed to contribute vocals on "Down for Yours" using the talkbox. The track reached #10 on the Billboard Hot Rap singles chart, and peaked at #69 on the Billboard Hot 100. The group's next chart hit was "AZ Side", whose "AZ Side Remix" was a rendition of Madonna's hit "Everybody".

In 1998, Nastyboy Klick released Tha Second Coming, led by the hip hop ballad "Lost in Love". This record reached #12 on the Billboard music charts, and #53 on the Billboard Hot 100. After the release of their second album, NBK began touring, but following a variety of challenges, the band went on hiatus and the members returned to their regular jobs.

=== NB Ridaz ===
Magic and DOS subsequently decided to pursue a career as a duo, requesting their management to release them from the contract with Upstairs Records, while Zig Zag and Sly began working on a new project on Upstairs Records. To avoid contractual restrictions association with the group's previous name, MC Magic formed the Nasty Boy Ridaz (known as the NB Ridaz), adding his son Mischief and nephew D-Dog to the line-up.

The NB Ridaz's first LP, Invasion, was released on September 11, 2001 on NastyBoy Records. The album was mostly put together from material recorded for a third NastyBoyKlick album, and included the singles "Runaway" and "Radio Song". The first single from the album, "Runaway", scraped into the Billboard Hot 100, and made the Rhythmic Top 40. After the success of this single, the album was picked up by Upstairs Records, and the group reunited.

In 2004, their second and final album, NBRidaz.com, made the Hip-Hop, Heatseeker and independent charts, featuring the singles "So Fly", "Pretty Girl", "4-Ever", "Notice Me", and "Wishin". "So Fly" broke into the lower reaches of the Billboard Hot 100, and charted on the Rap, R&B and Rhythmic Top 40 charts. "Notice Me" also reached the bottom of the Billboard Hot 100, receiving more airplay than previous tracks. "Pretty Girl" also charted on the Billboard Rhythmic, R&B and Rap charts.

NB Ridaz ceased performing as a group from 2006.

== Discography ==
=== As Nastyboy Klick/NBK ===
- 1997: The First Chapter
- 1998: Tha Second Coming

=== As NB Ridaz ===
Year	Title	Peak Chart Positions		
Year	Title	U.S. R&B	U.S. Heat	U.S. Ind
2001	Invasion (Nastyboy)	—	—	46
2001	Invasion (Upstairs)	—	—	—
2004	NB Ridaz.com	62	14	10
2008	Greatest Hits	—	—	—
