= Keith Murray discography =

- Studio albums: 9
- Compilation albums: 1
- Singles: 14
- Collaborative albums: 2

The discography of American rapper, Keith Murray consists of nine studio albums, two collaborative albums, one compilation album and fourteen singles.

== Studio albums ==
List of albums, with selected chart positions
Title	Album details	Peak chart positions		Certifications
Title	Album details	US	US R&B	Certifications
The Most Beautifullest Thing in This World	Released: September 20, 1994; Label: Jive; Format: CD, cassette, digital download, LP	34	5	RIAA: Gold
Enigma	Released: October 29, 1996; Label: Jive; Format: CD, cassette, digital download, LP	39	6	
It's a Beautiful Thing	Released: January 12, 1999; Label: Jive; Format: CD, cassette, digital download, LP	39	9	
He's Keith Murray	Released: July 15, 2003; Label: Def Jam; Format: CD, digital download	40	11	
Rap-Murr-Phobia (The Fear of Real Hip-Hop)	Released: July 31, 2007; Label: Koch; Format: CD, digital download	52	7	
Intellectual Violence	Released: April 22, 2008; Label: L.O.D. Entertainment; Format: CD, digital download	—	—	
Puff Puff Pass	Released: May 13, 2008; Label: Siccness.net; Format: CD, digital download	—	—	
Lord Of The Metaphor	Released: June 10, 2018; Label: Def Squad; Format: Digital download	—	—	
Lord Of The Metaphor 2	Released: May 18, 2019; Label: Def Squad; Format: Digital download	—	—	

== Collaboration albums ==
Year	Title	Chart positions		Certifications (sales thresholds)
Year	Title	US	US R&B	Certifications (sales thresholds)
1998	El Niño (with Def Squad): Released: June 30, 1998; Label: Def Jam	2	1	* US: Gold
2011	Canibus and Keith Murray are The Undergods (with Canibus as The Undergods): Released: May 3, 2011; Label: RBC	–	–	

== Compilation albums ==
Year	Album
1999	The Most Beautifullest Hits: Released: August 10, 1999; Label: Jive

== Singles ==
Year	Single	Chart positions			Album
Year	Single	US Hot 100	US R&B	US Rap	Album
1994	"The Most Beautifullest Thing in This World"	50	19	3	The Most Beautifullest Thing in This World
1995	"Get Lifted"	71	33	7	The Most Beautifullest Thing in This World
1995	"Danger"	–	–	–	The Most Beautifullest Thing in This World
1995	"It's That Hit"	–	–	–	Insomnia
1996	"The Rhyme"	–	59	12	Enigma
1996	"Yeah" (featuring Busta Rhymes, Def Squad & Jamal)	–	–	–	Enigma
1997	"Def Squad Delite" (with Def Squad)				In tha Beginning...There Was Rap
1998	"Full Cooperation" (with Def Squad)	–	51	–	El Niño
1998	"Incredible" (featuring LL Cool J)	–	70	36	It's a Beautiful Thing
2001	"Fatty Girl" (Ludacris, LL Cool J and Keith Murray)		61		The Good Life (FUBU album)
2003	"Yeah Yeah U Know It" (featuring Def Squad	99	50	–	He's Keith Murray
2003	"Candi Bar"	–	63	–	He's Keith Murray
2003	"Oh My Goodness"	–	–	–	He's Keith Murray
2007	"Nobody Do It Better" (featuring Junior and Tyrese)	–	65	–	Rap-Murr-Phobia (The Fear of Real Hip-Hop)
2007	"Hustle On"	–	–	–	Rap-Murr-Phobia (The Fear of Real Hip-Hop)
2011	"Strange Encounters" (featuring Letia Larok)	–	–	–	Strange Encounters EP

=== As featured artist ===
Year	Song	Chart Positions				Album
Year	Song	US	US R&B	AUS	UK	Album
1993	"Hostile" (Erick Sermon featuring Keith Murray)	–	–	–	–	No Pressure
1995	"I Shot Ya (Remix)" (LL Cool J featuring Keith Murray, Prodigy, Fat Joe and Foxy Brown)	–	55	–	–	Mr. Smith
1995	"Welcome" (Erick Sermon featuring Keith Murray)	–	12	–	–	Double or Nothing
1996	"Can't You See (Remix)" Total featuring Keith Murray]	13	3	–	–	Non-album single
1997	"Makin' Moves" (Tha Truth featuring Keith Murray)	–	–	–	–	Makin' Moves... Everyday
1998	"Independence Day" (Too $hort feat. Keith Murray)	–	–	–	–	Nationwide: Independence Day
1998	"Shorty (You Keep Playin' With My Mind)" (Imajin featuring Keith Murray)	–	–	75	–	Imajin
1998	"Home Alone" (R. Kelly featuring Keith Murray)	65	22	–	7	R.
2002	"Special Delivery (Remix) (P. Diddy feat. G-Dep, Ghostface Killah, Keith Murray & Craig Mack)	–	59	–	–	We Invented the Remix
2003	"Take It 2 the Head" (Kelly Price featuring Keith Murray)	–	–	–	–	Priceless

=== As collaborating artist ===
- 1993
  - "Swing It Over Here" (Erick Sermon feat. Redman & Keith Murray)
- 1994
  - "How's That" (Def Squad A Low Down Dirty Shame O.S.T.)
  - "Newark to C.I." (Shaquille O'Neal feat. Keith Murray Shaq-Fu: Da Return)
  - "Be Happy (Remix)" [Mary J. Blige feat. Keith Murray Non-A Sing]
  - "It's Going Down" (Ed Lover & Doctor Dre feat. Erick Sermon & Keith Murray Back Up Offa Me!)
  - "Cosmic Slop" (Def Squad Dare Iz a Darkside)
- 1995
  - "I Shot Ya" (LL Cool J feat. Keith Murray Mr. Smith)
  - "What I'm After (I Know You Remix)" [Lords of the Underground feat. Keith Murray Non-A Sing]
  - "Freestyle" (Funkmaster Flex feat. Redman & Keith Murray The Mix Tape, Volume 1: 60 Minutes of Funk)
  - "East Left" (Keith Murray New Jersey Drive O.S.T.)
  - "Tell 'Em"; "Set It Off"; "Open Fire" (Erick Sermon Double or Nothing)
  - "Vibin' (Keith Smoove Remix) [Boyz II Men feat. Def Squad Non-A Sing]
  - "Genetic for Terror" (Jamal feat. Keith Murray & L.O.D. Last Chance, No Breaks)
- 1996
  - "Flipmode Squad Meets Def Squad" (Busta Rhymes feat. Jamal, Redman, Keith Murray, Rampage & Lord Have Mercy The Coming)
  - "Live Wires Connect" [UGK, Keith Murray & Lord Jamar Don't Be a Menace to South Central While Drinking Your Juice in the Hood (soundtrack)]
  - "Breaker, Breaker" [Def Squad The Nutty Professor (soundtrack)]
  - "Gettin' It (Remix)" [Too Short feat. Def Squad & Parliament Funkadelic Gettin' It]
  - "No More Games (Pt 2) [Skindeep feat. Keith Murray & Miss Jones Non-A Sing]
  - "Da Ill Out" (Redman feat. Jamal & Keith Murray Muddy Waters)
- 1997
  - "Pay Ya Dues" (Frankie Cutlass feat. Keith Murray, Busta Rhymes & Cocoa Brovaz Politics & Bullshit)
  - "Dangerous Ground" (Keith Murray & 50 Grand Dangerous Ground O.S.T.)
  - "Weekend Thang (Big R Remix)" [Alfonzo Hunter feat. Keith Murray Non-A Sing]
  - "Hai!" (DJ Honda feat. Keith Murray & 50 Grand HII)
  - "Off the Wall" (Tha Alkaholiks feat. Keith Murray Likwidation)
  - "K.I.M." (EPMD feat. Def Squad)
- 1998
  - "Freestyle" (Funkmaster Flex feat. Keith Murray The Mix Tape, Vol. III)
  - "Down South Funk" (Def Squad Doc's da Name 2000)
  - "It's My Thang" (DJ Clue feat. Def Squad The Professional)
- 1999
  - "The Right Time" (Cherrelle feat. Keith Murray Non-A Sing)
  - "Slap Somebody" (Keith Murray Corruptor O.S.T.)
- 2000
  - "Hostility" (Def Squad Erick Onasis)
- 2001
  - "He's Back" (Keith Murray Rush Hour O.S.T.)
    - "Now Whut's Up"; Up Them Thangs; Music (Remix) [(Erick Sermon Music]
    - "Wrong 4 That" (Redman feat. Keith Murray Malpractice)
- 2002
  - "Fans (Clap Your Hands)" (Kali Fam feat. Keith Murray, Nelly & Redman)
  - "Say It Ain't So" (Birdman feat. Boo & Gotti, Mannie Fresh, Keith Murray & Mikkey)
  - "Hold Up Dub" (Erick Sermon feat. Keith Murray React)
- 2003
  - "Make Room" (Prince Paul feat. Keith Murray & Erick Sermon Politics of the Business)
- 2004
  - "Listen" (Erick Sermon feat. Keith Murray & Sy Scott Chilltown, New York)
  - "How You Want It" (Tony Touch feat. Def Squad The Piece Maker 2)
- 2008
  - "They Tell Me" (EPMD feat. Keith Murray)
- 2009
  - "Errbody Scream" (Method Man & Redman feat. Keith Murray Blackout 2)
  - "Cultivation" (O.S.T.R. feat. Keith Murray & Kochan)
- 2010
  - "Caes (Último Cigarro)" [Capaz feat. Keith Murray]
- 2011
  - "Word Up" (Grand Puba feat. Keith Murray)
  - "You & Me" (Joe Coudie feat. Keith Murray)
- 2013
  - "Bad" (AON Hence feat. Keith Murray 4th Quarter)
- 2015
  - "Murder Swagg" (Curt Digga feat. Keith Murray)
- 2019
  - "Stay Real" (Erick Sermon feat. Keith Murray & Nature)
- 2024
  - "Adore [HER]" (Da Beatminerz feat. Keith Murray)
