= Redman discography =

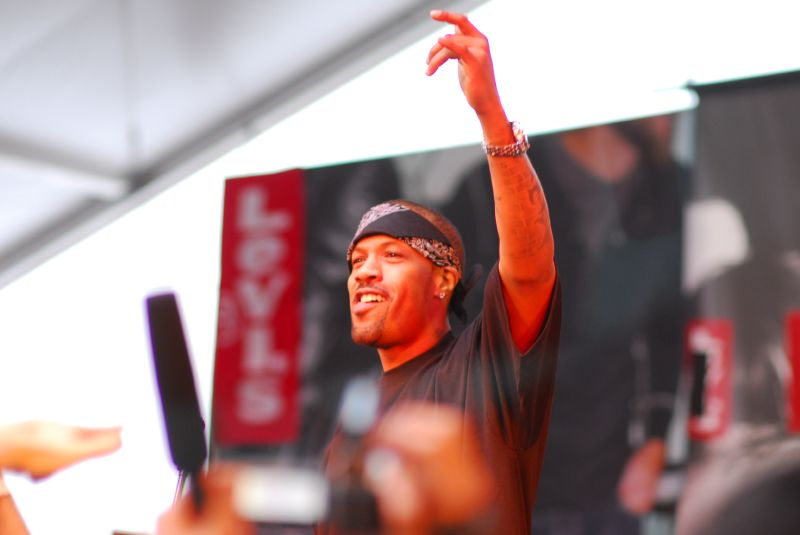
- Studio albums: 9
- Extended plays: 1
- Singles: 28
- Collaborative albums: 3
- Soundtrack album: 1
- Mixtapes: 5
- Guest appearances: 98

American rapper Redman has released nine studio albums, three collaborative albums, one soundtrack album, five mixtapes, one EP and twenty eight singles.

== Albums ==
=== Studio albums ===
List of studio albums, with selected chart positions, sales figures and certifications
Title	Album details	Peak chart positions									Sales	Certifications
Title	Album details	US	US R&B	US Rap	BEL	CAN	FRA	GER	SWI	UK	Sales	Certifications
Whut? Thee Album	Released: September 22, 1992 (US); Label: Rush Associated Labels; Formats: CD, LP, cassette	49	5	—	—	—	—	—	—	—	US: 655,000	RIAA: Gold
Dare Iz a Darkside	Released: November 22, 1994 (US); Label: Def Jam; Formats: CD, LP, cassette	13	1	—	—	—	—	—	—	—	US: 587,000	RIAA: Gold
Muddy Waters	Released: December 10, 1996 (US); Label: Def Jam; Formats: CD, LP, cassette	12	1	—	—	—	—	100	—	—	US: 767,000	RIAA: Gold
Doc's da Name 2000	Released: November 24, 1998 (US); Label: Def Jam; Formats: CD, LP, cassette	11	1	—	—	—	—	—	—	145	US: 1,056,000	RIAA: Platinum; MC: Gold
Malpractice	Released: May 22, 2001 (US); Label: Def Jam; Formats: CD, LP, cassette	4	1	—	39	18	40	62	74	57	US: 686,000	RIAA: Gold; BPI: Silver
Red Gone Wild: Thee Album	Released: March 27, 2007 (US); Label: Def Jam, Gilla House; Formats: CD, LP, digital download	13	4	—	—	41	91	—	37	115	US: 137,000	
Reggie	Released: December 7, 2010 (US); Label: Def Jam, Gilla House; Formats: CD, digital download	118	22	10	—	—	—	—	—	—	US: 26,000	
Mudface	Released: November 13, 2015 (US); Label: Gilla House; Formats: CD, digital download	147	13	9	—	—	—	—	—	—		
Muddy Waters Too	Released: December 24, 2024; Label: Gilla House; Format: digital download	—	—	—	—	—	—	—	—	—		
"—" denotes a recording that did not chart or was not released in that territory.

=== Collaborative albums ===
List of collaborative studio albums, with selected chart positions, sales figures and certifications
Title	Album details	Peak chart positions									Sales	Certifications
Title	Album details	US	US R&B	US Rap	CAN	FRA	GER	NLD	SWI	UK	Sales	Certifications
El Niño (with Def Squad)	Released: June 30, 1998 (US); Label: Def Jam; Formats: CD, LP, cassette	2	1	—	—	—	—	—	—	—	US: 500,000	RIAA: Gold
Blackout! (with Method Man)	Released: September 28, 1999 (US); Label: Def Jam; Formats: CD, LP, cassette	3	1	12	3	33	36	36	—	45	US: 1,575,000	RIAA: Platinum; BPI: Silver; MC: Platinum
Blackout! 2 (with Method Man)	Released: May 19, 2009 (US); Label: Def Jam; Formats: CD, LP, digital download	7	2	2	10	67	66	—	6	—	US: 179,000	
"—" denotes a recording that did not chart or was not released in that territory.

=== Soundtrack albums ===
List of soundtrack albums, with selected chart positions, sales figures and certifications
Title	Album details	Peak chart positions									Sales	Certifications
Title	Album details	US	US R&B	US Rap	CAN	FRA	GER	NLD	SWI	UK	Sales	Certifications
How High (with Method Man)	Released: December 11, 2001 (US); Label: Def Jam; Formats: CD, LP, cassette	38	6	—	—	—	—	—	—	—		
"—" denotes a recording that did not chart or was not released in that territory.

=== Other ===
List of mixtapes, EPs and compilation albums with year released
Title	Album details
Ill At Will Vol. 1 (mixtape)	Released: 2004; Label: Self-released; Format: CD, Digital download
Ill At Will Vol. 2 (mixtape)	Released: 2005; Label: Self-released; Format: CD, Digital download
Live from the Bricks (mixtape)	Released: 2007; Label: Self-released; Format: Digital download
Pancake & Syrup (mixtape album)	Released: 2010; Label: Gilla House; Format: CD, Digital download
Remixxes (compilation album)	Released: 2013; Label: Gilla House; Format: CD, Digital download
3 Joints (EP)	Released: 2020; Label: Gilla House; Format: Digital Download

== Singles ==
List of singles, with selected chart positions and certifications, showing year released and album name
Title	Year	Peak chart positions				Certifications	Album
Title	Year	US	US R&B	US Rap	AUS	Certifications	Album
"Blow Your Mind"	1992	—	42	1	—		Whut? Thee Album
"Time 4 Sum Aksion"	1993	—	63	1	—		Whut? Thee Album
"Tonight's da Night"	1993	—	78	20	—		Whut? Thee Album
"Rockafella"	1994	—	62	10	—		Dare Iz a Darkside
"Can't Wait"	1995	94	61	11	—		Dare Iz a Darkside
"Where Am I?"	1995	—	—	—	—		New Jersey Drive Vol. 1 (soundtrack)
"Funkorama"	1995	81	51	12	—		Insomnia
"It's Like That (My Big Brother)" (featuring K-Solo)	1996	95	40	11	—		Muddy Waters
"Whateva Man" (featuring Erick Sermon)	1997	42	18	3	—		Muddy Waters
"Pick It Up"	1997	—	69	—	—		Muddy Waters
"I'll Bee Dat!"	1998	—	50	30	—		Doc's da Name 2000
"Da Goodness" (with Busta Rhymes)	1999	—	50	9	—		Doc's da Name 2000
"Let Da Monkey Out"	1999	—	99	—	—		Doc's da Name 2000
"Let's Get Dirty (I Can't Get in da Club)" (featuring DJ Kool)	2001	97	46	9	—		Malpractice
"Smash Sumthin'" (featuring Adam F)	2001	—	87	24	—		Malpractice
"Ride" (featuring E3)	2003	—	—	—	—		Biker Boyz (soundtrack)
"Put It Down"	2007	102	92	—	—		Red Gone Wild
"Coc Back" (featuring Ready Roc)	2009	—	—	—	—		Non-album single
"Oh My"	2010	—	—	—	—		Non-album single
"Def Jammable"	2010	—	—	—	—		Reggie
"Rockin' wit da Best" (featuring Kool Moe Dee)	2011	—	—	—	—		Reggie
"Pump Ya Breaks"	2013						Music Video/Mixtape
"I Love Hip Hop"	2018	—	—	—	—		Muddy Waters 2
"YA!"	2018	—	—	—	—		Muddy Waters 2
"So Cool"	2022	—	—	—	—		Muddy Waters 2
"—" denotes a recording that did not chart.

== Other charted songs ==
List of other charted songs, with selected chart positions and certifications, showing year released and album name
Title	Year	Peak chart positions			Album
Title	Year	US	US R&B /HH	NZ Hot	Album
"Self Medication" (Logic featuring Seth MacFarlane, Redman and Statik Selektah)	2023	— (Note: "Self Medication" did not enter the Billboard Hot 100, but peaked at number 25 on the Bubbling Under Hot 100 Singles chart.)	49	21	College Park
"—" denotes a recording that did not chart or was not released in that territory.

== Guest appearances ==
List of non-single guest appearances, with other performing artists, showing year released and album name
Title	Year	Other artist(s)	Album
"Hardcore"	1990	EPMD	Business as Usual
"Brothers on My Jock"	1990	EPMD	Business as Usual
"Head Banger"	1992	EPMD, K-Solo	Business Never Personal
"Swing It Over Here"	1993	Erick Sermon, Keith Murray	No Pressure
"You Got It"	1993	Jodeci	Diary of a Mad Band
"Blaze It Up"	1993	Mel-Low	Blaze It Up
"Nuthin' but the Gangsta"	1994	MC Eiht, Compton's Most Wanted, Spice 1	We Come Strapped
"How's That"	1994	Def Squad	The Most Beautifullest Thing in This World/A Low Down Dirty Shame (soundtrack)
"My Style, My Stelo"	1994	Shaquille O'Neal, Erick Sermon	Shaq Fu: Da Return
"The Points"	1995	The Notorious B.I.G., Coolio, Doodlebug, Big Mike, Buckshot, Ill Al Skratch, Rock, Bone Thugs-N-Harmony, Busta Rhymes, Menace Clan and Jamal	Panther (soundtrack)
"Dat's My Word"	1995	DJ Honda	DJ Honda
"Freak Out"	1995	Erick Sermon	Double or Nothing
"Move On"	1995	Erick Sermon, Passion	Double or Nothing
"Open Fire"	1995	Def Squad	Double or Nothing
"Somethin' 4 Da Honeyz (Human Rhythm Remix)"	1995	Montell Jordan	Somethin' 4 da Honeyz
"Me and Those Dreamin' Eyes of Mine (Def Squad Remix)"	1995	D'Angelo	Brown Sugar (Deluxe)
"Vibin' (Kenny Smoove Remix #2)"	1995	Boyz II Men, Def Squad	Vibin
"Insane Creation"	1995	Jamal	Last Chance, No Breaks
"Flipmode Squad Meets Def Squad"	1996	Busta Rhymes, Jamal, Keith Murray, Rampage, Lord Have Mercy	The Coming
"Throw Your Hands in the Air"	1996	Cypress Hill, MC Eiht, Erick Sermon	Unreleased and Revamped
"Tonite's tha Night (Redman Remix)"	1996	Kris Kross	Young, Rich & Dangerous
"Breaker 1, Breaker 2"	1996	Def Squad	The Nutty Professor (soundtrack)
"Yeah"	1996	Def Squad, Busta Rhymes, Jamal	Enigma
"You & You & You"	1997	Frankie Cutlass, June Lover, Sadat X	Politics & Bullshit
"Freestyle"	1997	Funkmaster Flex	The Mix Tape, Vol. II
"Heartbeat"	1997	KRS-One, Angie Martinez	I Got Next
"Blowe"	1997	KRS-One	I Got Next
"Hypnotize"	1997	Luniz	Lunitik Muzik
"Beasts from the East"	1997	Lost Boyz, A+, Canibus	Love, Peace & Nappiness
"Down wit' Us"	1997	—N/a	How to Be a Player (soundtrack)
"Lose My Cool"	1997	SWV	Release Some Tension
"K.I.M."	1997	EPMD, Keith Murray	Back in Business
"Everyday"	1997	Tha Truth	Makin' Moves... Everyday
"Syrinx"	1997	—N/a	The Rapsody Overture
"Anything & Everything"	1998	Montell Jordan	Let's Ride
"Rap Scholar"	1998	Das EFX	Generation EFX
"Whatcha Gonna Do?" (Remix)	1998	Jayo Felony, Mack 10, WC	Whatcha Gonna Do?
"The Weekend"	1998	Dave Hollister, Erick Sermon	Ride (soundtrack)
"How Deep Is Your Love"	1998	Dru Hill	Rush Hour (soundtrack)
"Steppin' It Up"	1998	A Tribe Called Quest, Busta Rhymes	The Love Movement
"It's My Thang '99"	1998	DJ Clue?, Def Squad	The Professional
"Whateva Man (Remix)"	1998	Too Short	Nationwide: Independence Day
"Made It Back"	1998	Beverley Knight	Prodigal Sista
"Body Movin' (Def Squad Remix)"	1998	Beastie Boys	Body Movin'
"Coffee Shop"	1998	8Ball	Lost
"Ride wit Us"	1999	Def Squad, Too Short	It's a Beautiful Thing/ El Niño
"Ghetto Hymns"	1999	Dave Hollister	Ghetto Hymns
"5 Boroughs"	1999	KRS-One, Bounty Killer, Keith Murray, Prodigy, Cam'Ron, Run, Killah Priest, Vigilante	The Corruptor (soundtrack)
"Fake Thugs Dedication"	1999	Puff Daddy	Forever
"Reverse"	1999	Puff Daddy, Busta Rhymes, CeeLo Green, G-Dep, Sauce Money, Shyne	Forever
"Dangerous Mouths"	1999	Missy Elliott	Da Real World
"Future Sport"	1999	Lil' Cease, Mr. Bristal, Joe Hooker	The Wonderful World of Cease A Leo
"Redman Freestyle"	1999	Sway & King Tech	This or That
"Soopaman Lover"	1999	Chico DeBarge	Soopaman Lover
"Okay"	1999	Funkmaster Flex, Erick Sermon	The Tunnel
"Hostility"	2000	Def Squad	Erick Onasis
"Lil' Drummer Boy"	2000	Lil' Kim, Cee Lo Green	The Notorious K.I.M.
"Love Me Now (Rockwilder Remix)"	2000	Beenie Man, Wyclef Jean	Art and Life
"W.K.Y.A."	2000	Saukrates	Lyricist Lounge 2
"Off the Wall"	2000	Eminem	Nutty Professor II: The Klumps (soundtrack)
"Oooh."	2000	De La Soul	Art Official Intelligence: Mosaic Thump
"Come and Get It"	2000	DJ Clue, Lady Luck	Backstage: Music Inspired by the Film
"And Yo"	2000	Scarface, Young Noble	The Last of a Dying Breed
"We Ride"	2000	Nocoast	Coastales
"Redbull"	2000	Wu-Tang Clan	The W
"Original Prankster"	2000	The Offspring	Conspiracy of One
"RED"	2001	DJ Clue	The Professional 2
"State vs. Kirk Jones"	2001	Sticky Fingaz, Rah Digga, Canibus, Scarred 4 Life	Black Trash: The Autobiography of Kirk Jones
"Now Whut's Up"	2001	Def Squad, Sy Scott	Music
"Music (Remix)"	2001	Def Squad	Music
"Hey Ladies"	2001	Lady Luck	Exit Wounds (soundtrack)
"Keep It Real (Tell Me)"	2001	Musiq Soulchild	Rush Hour 2 (soundtrack)
"Sweet Dreams"	2001	P!nk	Get the Party Started
"Dirrty"	2002	Christina Aguilera	Stripped
"Gorillaz on My Mind"	2002	Gorillaz	Blade II: The Soundtrack
"React"	2002	Erick Sermon	React
"From Long Beach 2 Brick City"	2002	Snoop Dogg, Nate Dogg	Paid tha Cost to Be da Boss
"Pocketbook (Rockwilder/Missy Elliott Remix)"	2002	Me'shell Ndegeocello, Missy Elliott, Rockwilder, Tweet	Cookie: The Anthropological Mixtape
"So Vicious"	2003	DJ Envy	The Desert Storm Mixtape: Blok Party, Vol. 1
"Yeah Yeah U Know It"	2003	Def Squad	He's Keith Murray
"Sumthin' Scandalous"	2003	Mis-Teeq	Eye Candy
"She Ain't Right for You (remix)"	2003	Macy Gray	She Ain't Right for You
"Baby Daddy"	2003	Wyclef Jean	The Preacher's Son
"Fire (Remix)"	2003	Joe Budden	Fire (Single)
"The Set Up (Remix)"	2004	Obie Trice, Dr. Dre, Lloyd Banks, Jadakiss	The Set Up (Single)
"Street Hop"	2004	Erick Sermon, Tre	Chilltown, New York
"Future Thug"	2004	Erick Sermon	Chilltown, New York
"The East Side"	2004	Goldie Loc, Tray Dee	Tha After Party
"One Shot Deal"	2005	Beanie Sigel	The B. Coming
"All I Want"	2005	Christian Blaizer, Erick Sermon	All I Want
"Where It's At"	2005	Tha Eastsidaz	Free Tray Deee... Volume 1
"Stepping It Up"	2005	The Baka Boyz	The Return Of Friday Night Flavas
"Get Up, Stand Up"	2005	Sheek Louch	After Taxes
"Greedy Bitches"	2006	Ghostface Killah, Shawn Wigs	More Fish
"U Ain't Nobody"	2007	Def Squad	Rap-Murr-Phobia (The Fear of Real Hip-Hop)
"Best Believe"	2008	Pete Rock, LD	NY's Finest
"The Burning Bush"	2008	88-Keys	The Death of Adam
"Yo"	2008	EPMD	We Mean Business
"This Is It (Showoff Remix)"	2008	Statik Selektah, Black Rob, D-Dot	Stick 2 the Script
"Was Dat Sound"	2009	Icadon, Rockwilder	Robot-ic
"Shut the Lights Off"	2010	Adam F, Horx	Shut the Lights Off
"Red"	2011	The Game	Hood Morning (No Typo): Candy Coronas
"Please Tell Me"	2011	Guile	Made Me Realize
"Like This"	2013	Fard	Bellum et Pax
"Notorious"	2013	Mathematics, Eyes-Low, Mr. Cream	Prelude to the Answer
"Groove"	2013	Dope D.O.D.	Da Roach
"Stop Playin'"	2013	Bun B, Royce da 5'9"	Trill OG: The Epilogue
"Paari"	2013	Bobo, Bobyleon	—N/a
"Clean"	2016	Rick Rock, Goldie Gold	Rocket
"Lesson Learn'd"	2017	Wu-Tang Clan	The Saga Continues
"People Say"	2017	Wu-Tang Clan	The Saga Continues
"Nutshell Pt. 2"	2022	Phife Dawg, Busta Rhymes	Forever
"French Kiss Trois"	2022	Phife Dawg, Illa J	Forever
"Royce & Reggie"	2023	Royce da 5′9″	The Heaven Experience EP
"Self-Medication"	2023	Logic, Statik Selektah, Seth MacFarlane	College Park
"Pack a Lunch"	2023	Prof	Horse
"Last Nite"	2024	Potatohead People	Eat Your Heart Out

== See also ==
- Method Man & Redman discography
