= The Most Beautifullest Hits =

Greatest hits album by Keith Murray
- Released: August 10, 1999
- Genre: Hip hop
- Length: 53:03
- Label: Jive
- Producer: Erick Sermon; Redman; The Ummah; Trackmasters

Keith Murray chronology
It's A Beautiful Thing (1999)	The Most Beautifullest Hits (1999)	He's Keith Murray (2003)

Professional ratings
Review scores
Source	Rating
AllMusic	4.5/5 stars
NME	3/5 stars
RapReviews	8/10

The Most Beautifullest Hits is a greatest hits album by American rapper Keith Murray. It was released on August 10, 1999, through Jive Records, and consists of 14 previously released songs. Production was handled by Erick Sermon, who produced the majority of the songs, Redman, The Ummah and Trackmasters. It features contributions from Def Squad, LL Cool J, 50 Grand, Fat Joe, Foxy Brown, Jeffrey Stewart, Prodigy and Too $hort.

== Background ==
The 14-track compilation is composed of several songs from Murray's first three solo albums and Def Squad's El Niño, as well as his guest appearances on Erick Sermon's No Pressure, Redman's Dare Iz a Darkside and LL Cool J's Mr. Smith.

In a similar manner to Murray's previous album, It's a Beautiful Thing, the greatest hits compilation was an attempt by Jive Records to capitalize on Murray's success while he was incarcerated - despite Murray's disapproval.

== Track listing ==
No.	Title	Writer(s)	Producer(s)	Length
1.	"Hostile" (featuring Erick Sermon and Jeffrey Stewart)	Keith Omar Murray; Erick Sermon	Erick Sermon	3:37
2.	"The Most Beautifullest Thing in This World"	Murray; Sermon; Ronald Isley; Rudolph Isley; Marvin Isley; O'Kelly Isley Jr.; Ernest Isley; Chris Jasper; George Clinton; William Earl Collins; Maceo Parker	Erick Sermon	3:43
3.	"Get Lifted"	Murray; Sermon; Harry Wayne Casey; Richard Finch	Erick Sermon	4:00
4.	"Incredible" (featuring LL Cool J)	Murray; James Todd Smith; Sermon; James Brown; Charles Bobbit; Fred Wesley	Erick Sermon	3:03
5.	"Cosmic Slop" (performed by Def Squad)	Murray; Reginald Noble; Sermon; Gregory Webster; Norman Napier; Ralph Middlebrooks; Leroy Bonner; Marshall Jones; Walter Morrison; Andrew Noland; Marvin Pierce	Redman	2:55
6.	"The Rhyme"	Murray; Sermon; Frankie Beverly	Erick Sermon	3:30
7.	"When I Rap"	Murray; Sermon; Noble; J.T. Smith; Germaine Williams; Clifford Smith	Erick Sermon	3:21
8.	"I Shot Ya (Remix)" (featuring LL Cool J, Prodigy, Fat Joe and Foxy Brown)	Murray; J.T. Smith; Albert Johnson; Joseph Cartagena; Inga Marchand; Jean-Claude Olivier; Brown; Lyn Collins	Trackmasters	5:03
9.	"Full Cooperation" (performed by Def Squad)	Murray; Sermon; Noble; Harold Ousley	Erick Sermon	2:58
10.	"How's That" (performed by Def Squad)	Murray; Sermon; Noble; Clinton; Collins; Bernie Worrell	Erick Sermon	3:05
11.	"Danger"	Murray; Sermon; Roger Troutman; Larry Troutman	Erick Sermon	3:34
12.	"Ride Wit Us" (performed by Def Squad featuring Too $hort)	Murray; Sermon; Noble; Todd Shaw	Erick Sermon	3:48
13.	"Dangerous Ground" (featuring 50 Grand)	Murray; Gerald Berlin; James Yancey	The Ummah	3:40
14.	"Def Squad Delite" (performed by Def Squad)	Murray; Sermon; Noble; Nile Rodgers; Bernard Edwards	Erick Sermon	6:46
Total length:				53:03

Notes

- Track 1 is taken from Erick Sermon's No Pressure album © 1993 Rush Associated Labels.
- Tracks 2, 3, 10 and 11 are taken from Keith Murray's The Most Beautifullest Thing in This World album 1994 ℗ Zomba Recording Corporation.
- Track 4 and 7 are taken from Keith Murray's It's a Beautiful Thing album 1999 © Zomba Recording Corporation.
- Track 5 is taken from Redman's Dare Iz a Darkside album 1994 © Rush Associated Labels.
- Tracks 6 and 13 are taken from Keith Murray's Enigma album 1996 © Zomba Recording Corporation.
- Track 8 is taken from LL Cool J's "Hey Lover" single 1995 ℗ Def Jam Records, Inc.
- Tracks 9, 12 and 14 are taken from Def Squad's El Niño album 1998 © Rush Associated Labels.

Sample credits

- Track 2 contains samples of "Between the Sheets" by The Isley Brothers, "Bootsy Gets Live" by Bootsy Collins and "Slow Down" by Brand Nubian.
- Track 3 contains a sample of "I Get Lifted" by George McCrae.
- Track 4 contains a sample of "Sportin' Life" by James Brown.
- Track 5 contains a sample of "Funky Worm" by Ohio Players.
- Track 6 contains a sample of "Before I Let Go" by Maze.
- Track 7 contains a sample of "4, 3, 2, 1" by LL Cool J.
- Track 8 contains a sample of "Put It on the Line" by Lyn Collins.
- Track 9 contains a sample of "Pretty Please" by Houston Person.
- Track 10 contains a sample of "The Show" by Slick Rick.
- Track 11 contains a sample of "Dance Floor" by Roger Troutman.
- Track 14 contains a sample of "Rapper's Delight" by The Sugarhill Gang.

== Personnel ==
- Keith Murray – vocals
- Erick Sermon – vocals (tracks 1, 5, 9, 10, 12, 14), producer (tracks 1–4, 6–7, 9–12, 14)
- Jeffrey Stewart – vocals (track 1)
- James Todd "LL Cool J" Smith – vocals (tracks 4, 8)
- Reginald "Redman" Noble – vocals (tracks 5, 9, 10, 12, 14), producer (track 5)
- Albert "Prodigy" Johnson – vocals (track 8)
- Joseph "Fat Joe" Cartagena – vocals (track 8)
- Inga "Foxy Brown" Marchand – vocals (track 8)
- Todd "Too $hort" Shaw – vocals (track 12)
- Gerald "50 Grand" Berlin – vocals (track 13)
- Jean-Claude "Poke" Olivier – producer (track 8)
- James "Jay Dee" Yancey – producer (track 13)
