= Bomdigi =

Single by Erick Sermon

from the album Double or Nothing
- B-side: "Tell 'Em"
- Released: October 17, 1995
- Recorded: 1995
- Studio: Mirror Image (Dix Hills, NY)
- Genre: East Coast hip-hop; hardcore hip-hop
- Label: RAL; Def Jam
- Songwriters: Erick Sermon; Rick James
- Producer: Erick Sermon

Erick Sermon singles chronology
"Stay Real" (1993)	"Bomdigi" (1995)	"Welcome" (1996)

Music video
- "Bomdigi" on YouTube

Professional ratings
Review scores
Source	Rating
AllMusic	4.5/5 stars

"Bomdigi" is a hip-hop song by American rapper Erick Sermon. It was released on October 17, 1995, through Rush Associated Labels as the lead single from his second solo studio album, Double or Nothing (1995). Recording sessions took place at Mirror Image in Dix Hills, New York. Production was handled by Sermon himself together with co-producer Sugarless, who utilized samples from the Mary Jane Girls' "All Night Long". An accompanying music video was directed by Terry Heller and Chuck Ozeas.

The single peaked at numbers 78 and 84 on the US Cash Box Top 100 and Billboard Hot 100, number five on the Dance Singles Sales, number 39 on the Hot R&B/Hip-Hop Songs and number nine on the Hot Rap Songs charts in the United States.

== Track listing ==
7", 12", 33 1/3 RPM, CD, vinyl
No.	Title	Writer(s)	Producer(s)	Length
1.	"Bomdigi (Radio Version)"	Erick Sermon; Rick James	Erick Sermon; Sugarless (co.)
2.	"Bomdigi (LP Version)"	Sermon; James	Erick Sermon; Sugarless (co.)
3.	"Bomdigi (Instrumental)"	Sermon; James	Erick Sermon; Sugarless (co.)
4.	"Bomdigi (A Cappella)"	Sermon; James	Erick Sermon; Sugarless (co.)
5.	"Tell 'Em (Radio Version)"	Sermon; Keith Murray; Roslyn Noble; Rod Kirkpatrick	Rod 'KP' Kirkpatrick; Erick Sermon (co.)
6.	"Tell 'Em (LP Version)"	Sermon; Murray; Noble; Kirkpatrick	Rod 'KP' Kirkpatrick; Erick Sermon (co.)
7.	"Bomdigi (Remix)" (featuring Tommy Gunn)	Sermon; Thomas Blincoe; James	Erick Sermon; Sugarless (co.)

Sample credits

- Tracks 1 to 4 and 7 contain elements from "All Night Long" written by Rick James and performed by the Mary Jane Girls.
- Tracks 5 and 6 contain elements from "The Show" written by Doug E. Fresh and Slick Rick.

== Personnel ==
- Erick Sermon – vocals, producer (tracks: 1–4, 7), co-producer (tracks: 5, 6)
- Crystal Gamble – backing vocals (tracks: 1–4, 7)
- Keith Murray – vocals (tracks: 5, 6)
- Roslyn "Roz" Noble – vocals (tracks: 5, 6)
- Thomas "Tommy Gunn" Blincoe – vocals (track 7)
- Tyrone "Sugarless" Fyffe – co-producer (tracks: 1–4, 7)
- Rod 'KP' Kirkpatrick – producer (tracks: 5, 6)
- Troy Hightower – recording, mixing
- Mike Hogan – assistant mix engineering
- Tony Dawsey – mastering

== Charts ==
Chart (1995)	Peak position
US Billboard Hot 100	84
US Hot R&B/Hip-Hop Songs (Billboard)	39
US Hot Rap Songs (Billboard)	9
US Dance Singles Sales (Billboard)	5
US Cash Box Top 100	78
