= Keep It Real (Jamal song) =

Single by Jamal

from the album Last Chance, No Breaks
- Released: February 12, 1996
- Recorded: 1995
- Genre: Hip hop
- Length: 3:24
- Label: Rowdy
- Songwriters: Jamal Phillips; Erick Sermon
- Producer: Erick Sermon

Jamal singles chronology
"Fades Em All" (1995)	"Keep It Real" (1996)

"Keep It Real" is the second and final single released from Jamal's debut album Last Chance, No Breaks. The song was produced by Erick Sermon. "Keep It Real" was another minor success for Jamal, peaking at #17 on the Hot Rap Singles and #76 on the Hot R&B/Hip-Hop Singles & Tracks.

== Music video ==
The music video for "Keep it Real" was released in March 1996. Def Squad's Keith Murray and Redman make appearances in the video.

== Single Track listing ==
=== A-Side ===
1. "Keep It Real" (Radio Mix)- 3:24
2. "Keep It Real" (Album Version)- 3:24
3. "Keep It Real" (Instrumental)- 3:24
4. "Keep It Real" (Acappella)- 3:22

=== B-Side ===
1. "Unfuckwittable" (Album Version)- 5:54
2. "Unfuckwittable" (Instrumental)- 5:52
3. "Unfuckwittable" (Acappella)- 5:53
