= Welcome (Erick Sermon song) =

Single by Erick Sermon feat. Keith Murray

from the album Double or Nothing
- B-side: "Do Your Thing"
- Released: January 23, 1996
- Recorded: 1995
- Genre: Hip hop, East Coast hip hop
- Length: 3:56
- Label: Def Jam
- Songwriters: D. Stinson, E. Sermon
- Producer: Rockwilder

Erick Sermon singles chronology
"Bomdigi" (1995)	"Welcome" (1996)	"Full Cooperation" (1998)

Keith Murray singles chronology
"It's That Hit" (1995)	"Welcome" (1996)	"The Rhyme" (1996)

"Welcome" is a song by American hip hop artist Erick Sermon recorded for his second album Double or Nothing (1995). The song, which features Sermon's fellow Def Squad member Keith Murray, was released as the second and final single from the album on January 23, 1996.

== Track listing ==
12", Vinyl

1. "Welcome" (Radio Edit)
  (feat. Keith Murray & Aaron Hall)
2. "Welcome" (Instrumental)
3. "Welcome" (LP Version)
  (feat. Keith Murray)
4. "Do Your Thing" (LP Version)

CD

1. "Welcome" (LP Version)
  (feat. Keith Murray)
2. "Bomdigi" (Remix)
3. "Do Your Thing" (LP Version)

== Chart performance ==
Chart (1996)	Peak position
U.S. Hot Dance Music/Maxi-Singles Sales	13
U.S. Hot R&B/Hip-Hop Singles & Tracks	41
U.S. Hot Rap Singles	12

== Personnel ==
- assistant mix engineering – Mike Hogan
- co-production – Erick Sermon
- mastering – Tony Dawsey
- mixing – Troy Hightower
- production – Reggie Noble, Rockwilder
- vocals – Keith Murray
- writing – Reggie Noble, Erick Sermon, Dana Stinson
