= Dare Iz a Darkside =

Studio album by Redman
- Released: November 22, 1994
- Recorded: March 1993 – August 1994
- Genres: East Coast hip-hop; experimental rap; gangsta rap
- Length: 68:37
- Label: Def Jam
- Producers: Erick Sermon (exec.); Reggie Noble; Rockwilder

Redman chronology
Whut? Thee Album (1992)	Dare Iz a Darkside (1994)	Muddy Waters (1996)

Singles from Dare Iz a Darkside
- 1. "Rockafella" Released: September 29, 1994; 2. "Can't Wait" Released: February 7, 1995

Dare Iz a Darkside is the second studio album by American rapper Redman. It was released on November 22, 1994, by Def Jam Recordings. The album debuted at No. 13 on the US Billboard 200. The album was certified gold by the Recording Industry Association of America (RIAA).

The album cover features Redman buried in the ground up to his neck, a reference to the cover of Funkadelic's 1971 album Maggot Brain. In addition, the song "Cosmic Slop" shares its name with a 1973 Funkadelic album. The album spawned the two singles "Rockafella" & "Can't Wait".

In 2010, Redman told Vibe Magazine that he never performed any songs from Dare Iz A Darkside in recent years - primarily due to the album being made during one of the dark times in his life. The positive reaction to the album stunned Redman, who said "I was doing a lot of drugs on Dare Iz A Darkside. I have chicks that come up to me and say, 'Yo, Dare Iz A Darkside is my favorite fuckin' album, ever.' I swear, I have not played Dare Iz A Darkside damn near since I did it. Seriously! I was so lost, I was so fucked up during that album". However, during his Verzuz battle with fellow rapper Method Man on April 20, 2021, Redman performed "Can't Wait" for the first time since its single release in 1995.

== Critical reception ==
Professional ratings
Review scores
Source	Rating
AllMusic	3/5 stars
Music Week	4/5 stars
Pitchfork	8.7/10
Q	4/5 stars
RapReviews	9/10
The Source	4/5 stars
Vibe	(favorable)

Dare Iz a Darkside has been regarded by critics as an anomaly in Redman's discography due to its darker, more muted sound in comparison to his other work. Steve Juon of RapReviews described the album as "the most obscure and unappreciated" of Redman's albums in a 2002 review. Writing in 2026, Jayson Greene of Pitchfork calls the album "the one time in his long career that Reggie Noble forgot to be ingratiating", and describes the characteristic features of its sound as "atmospheric" darkness and "clotted and muffled" bass. Jason Birchmeier of AllMusic describes Dare Iz a Darkside as having polarized Redman's fanbase, saying that some "admire ... its eccentricities" while others find it "too inaccessible"; Birchmeier himself gave the album a mixed review, saying that its production lacked the "trademark funk" of other albums Erick Sermon had worked on. (Note: Birchmeier directs his criticism of the production toward Sermon, although the majority of Dare Iz a Darkside was in fact produced by Redman himself.) A contemporary review from Music Week found that the production was "sometimes too dense", but was overall positive, offering praise for Redman's lyricism.

In 2025, Pitchfork placed Dare Iz a Darkside at number 78 on their list of the "100 Best Rap Albums of All Time". The website's writer Paul A. Thompson said that Redman "struck a delicate balance between outre zaniness and undeniable chops, ensuring that every joke landed, but that the method of delivery would elicit gasps."

== Commercial performance ==
Dare Iz a Darkside debuted at number 13 on the US Billboard 200 chart, and number one on the US Top R&B/Hip-Hop Albums selling 83,000 copies, becoming his first number one on the chart. On January 27, 1995, the album was certified gold by the Recording Industry Association of America (RIAA) for sales of over 500,000 copies. As of October 2009, the album has 587,000 copies in the United States.

== Track listing ==
No.	Title	Writer(s)	Producer(s)	Length
1.	"Dr. Trevis"	Reggie Noble	Redman	1:37
2.	"Bobyahed2dis"	Noble; Dana Stinson; J. Stewart; George Clinton Jr.; Garry Marshall Shider; David Lee Spradley	Redman; Rockwilder	3:24
3.	"Journey Throo da Darkside"	Noble; Erick Sermon; Norman Whitfield	Redman; Erick Sermon (co.)	2:26
4.	"Da Journee"	Noble	Redman	2:12
5.	"A Million and 1 Buddah Spots"	Noble; Sermon	Erick Sermon; Redman (co.)	3:23
6.	"Noorotic"	Noble; Stinson	Rockwilder; Redman (co.)	3:32
7.	"Boodah Session"	Noble	Redman	0:31
8.	"Cosmic Slop" (featuring Erick Sermon and Keith Murray)	Noble; Sermon; Keith Murray	Redman; Erick Sermon (co.)	2:56
9.	"Rockafella (R.I.P.)"	Noble; Sermon	Redman	0:25
10.	"Rockafella"	Noble; Leon Haywood; Clinton Jr.; Bernard George Worrell; William Collins	Redman	4:44
11.	"Green Island"	Noble; Robert Alexander Anderson; A. Stillman	Redman	5:42
12.	"Basically"	Noble	Redman	2:03
13.	"Can't Wait"	Noble; Sermon; Rick James; Antonio Hardy	Erick Sermon; Redman (co.)	4:13
14.	"Winicumuhround"	Noble; Sermon; Clinton Jr.; Shider; Spradley	Erick Sermon; Redman (co.)	4:28
15.	"Wuditlooklike"	Noble	Redman	4:09
16.	"Slide and Rock On"	Noble; Vaughan Mason; Robert Telson; Clinton Jr.; Shider; Spradley	Redman	3:54
17.	"Sooperman Luva II"	Noble; John Watson; Reynaldo Rey; Timothy Gatling; Alton Stewart	Redman	4:50
18.	"We Run N.Y." (featuring Hurricane G)	Noble; Gloria Rodríguez; Lawrence Parker; Rodney LeMay; Alan Lomax; Eric Burdon; Bryan Chandler	Redman	4:13
19.	"Dr. Trevis (Signs Off)"	Noble	Redman	1:39
20.	"Tonight's da Nite (Remix) [CD Only Track]"	Noble	Redman	3:51
Total length:				1:04:03

The original cassette version is in a solid red shell.

== Personnel ==
Information taken from Allmusic.

- Engineering – Mike Bona, Bob Fudjinski, Dave Greenberg, Bob Morse
- Executive Production – Erick Sermon
- Mastering – Tony Dawsey
- Mixing – Bob Fudjinski, Dave Greenberg, Bob Morse
- Narration – Jeff Stewart
- Performing – Hurricane G, Keith Murray, Erick Sermon
- Photography – Danny Clinch
- Production – Reggie Noble, Erick Sermon
- Sequencing – Reggie Noble, Jeff Trotter
- Vocals – Reggie Noble, Erick Sermon

== Charts ==
=== Weekly charts ===
Chart (1994)	Peak position
US Billboard 200	13
US Top R&B/Hip-Hop Albums (Billboard)	1

=== Year-end charts ===
Chart (1995)	Position
US Billboard 200	191
US Top R&B/Hip-Hop Albums (Billboard)	33

=== Singles ===
Year	Single	Peak chart positions			
Year	Single	U.S. Billboard Hot 100	U.S. Hot Dance Music/Maxi-Singles Sales	U.S. Hot R&B/Hip-Hop Singles & Tracks	U.S. Hot Rap Singles
1994	"Rockafella"	—	3	62	10
1995	"Can't Wait"	94	5	61	11
"—" denotes releases that did not chart.

== Certifications ==
Region	Certification	Certified units/sales
United States (RIAA)	Gold	500,000^{^}
^{^} Shipments figures based on certification alone.

== See also ==
- List of number-one R&B albums of 1994 (U.S.)
