= Greatest Day (Beverley Knight song) =

1999 single by Beverley Knight

Single by Beverley Knight

from the album Prodigal Sista
- Released: 5 July 1999
- Length: 4:16
- Label: Rhythm Series, Dome
- Songwriter(s): Beverley Knight, Pule Pheto, Neville Thomas
- Producer(s): Mike Spencer

Beverley Knight singles chronology
"Made It Back 99" (1999)	"Greatest Day" (1999)	"Sista Sista" (re-release) (1999)

Alternative covers
- CD 2 cover

"Greatest Day" is a song by British singer Beverley Knight, released as the fifth single from her second studio album, Prodigal Sista (1998), on 5 July 1999. The track contains a re-recorded sample of "Act Like You Know" by American R&B group Fat Larry's Band. "Greatest Day" became Knight's highest-charting single up to that point when it peaked at number 14 on the UK Singles Chart. The music video for the song was shot by director Jake Nava, who had previously shot Beverley's "Made It Back '99" video.

== Track listings ==
UK CD1

1. "Greatest Day" (classic mix)
2. "Weekend Thing"
3. "Greatest Day" (Ruffland mix)

UK CD2

1. "Greatest Day" (classic mix)
2. "Greatest Day" (Curtis & Moore 12-inch mix)
3. "Greatest Day" (two step mix)

UK cassette single

1. "Greatest Day" (classic mix)
2. "Greatest Day" (Ruffland mix)

Dutch CD single

1. "Greatest Day" (classic mix)
2. "Weekend Thing"

== Personnel ==
Personnel are taken from the UK CD1 liner notes.

- Beverley Knight – writing, vocals
- Pule Pheto – writing
- Neville Thomas – writing
- Mark Birts – writing ("Act Like You Know")
- Terry Price – writing ("Act Like You Know")
- Nicholas J. Martinelli – writing ("Act Like You Know")
- Rob Harris – guitar
- Derrick McIntyre – bass
- Mike Spencer – keyboards, production
- Shane Meehan – drums
- The Horny Horns – horns
- Elisa – strings
- Andy Kowalski – mixing
- Dillon Gallagher – initial programming
- Simon de Winter – initial programming

== Charts ==
=== Weekly charts ===
Chart (1999)	Peak position
Europe (Eurochart Hot 100)	50
Scotland (OCC)	25
UK Singles (OCC)	14
UK Hip Hop/R&B (OCC)	4

=== Year-end charts ===
Chart (1999)	Position
UK Urban (Music Week)	13
