= Fatty Girl =

Single by Ludacris, LL Cool J and Keith Murray

from the album The Good Life
- Released: December 4, 2001
- Recorded: 2001
- Genre: Hip-hop
- Length: 3:53
- Label: FUBU; Universal
- Songwriters: Christopher Bridges; James Todd Smith; Keith Murray
- Producer: Trackmasters

Ludacris singles chronology
"Welcome to Atlanta" (2001)	"Fatty Girl" (2001)	"Saturday (Oooh! Ooooh!)" (2002)

LL Cool J singles chronology
"Put Your Hands Up" (2001)	"Fatty Girl" (2001)	"Blink Blink" (2002)

Keith Murray singles chronology
"Incredible" (1998)	"Fatty Girl" (2001)	"Yeah Yeah U Know It" (2003)

"Fatty Girl" is a collaborative single by rappers Ludacris, LL Cool J, and Keith Murray. The song was produced by the Trackmasters and was released as the lead single from the FUBU compilation The Good Life. The music video was directed by Hype Williams.

The song became a minor hit on the Billboard Hot 100, peaking at number 87. It found more success on the Hot Rap Singles, reaching number six.

The album was mentioned by FUBU CEO Daymond John on an episode of ABC's Shark Tank. John said he was in the hole for $6 million on the album, but the hit single "Fatty Girl" ended up earning $100 million through clothing.

== Single track listing ==
1. "Fatty Girl" (Squeaky Clean Edit) – 3:55
2. "Fatty Girl" (Radio version) – 3:54
3. "Fatty Girl" (Album version) – 3:52
4. "Fatty Girl" (Instrumental) – 3:54

== Chart history ==
Chart performance for "Fatty Girl"
Chart (2001)	Peak position
US Billboard Hot 100	87
US Hot R&B/Hip-Hop Songs (Billboard)	32
US Hot Rap Songs (Billboard)	6
