= The Rhyme (song) =

Single by Keith Murray

from the album Enigma
- B-side: "Yeah"
- Released: October 12, 1996
- Recorded: 1996
- Genre: Hip hop
- Length: 3:37
- Label: Jive
- Songwriters: Keith Murray; Erick Sermon; Frankie Beverly
- Producer: Erick Sermon

Keith Murray singles chronology
"Welcome" (1996)	"The Rhyme" (1996)	"Full Cooperation" (1998)

Music video
- "The Rhyme" on YouTube

Professional ratings
Review scores
Source	Rating
AllMusic	2.5/5 stars

"The Rhyme" is a song by American rapper Keith Murray. It was released on October 21, 1996 through Jive Records as the only single from Murray's second studio album Enigma. The original version was again produced by Erick Sermon, who utilized samples from Maze's "Before I Let Go" and Run-DMC's "Sucker M.C.'s", with the remix produced by Jay Dee. The official music video for the song was directed by Brian Luvar.

The single peaked at number 59 on the Hot R&B/Hip-Hop Songs, number 12 on the Hot Rap Songs and number 3 on the Hot Dance Music/Maxi-Singles Sales charts in the United States.

== Track listing ==
No.	Title	Writer(s)	Length
1.	"The Rhyme" (LP Version)	Keith Murray; Erick Sermon; Frankie Beverly	3:37
2.	"The Rhyme" (Instrumental)	Murray; Sermon; Beverly	3:38
3.	"The Rhyme" (The Slum Village Instrumental)	Murray; Sermon; Beverly	4:01
4.	"The Rhyme" (The Slum Village Street Remix)	Murray; Sermon; Beverly	4:01
5.	"Yeah" (featuring Busta Rhymes, Redman, Erick Sermon and Jamal)	Murray; Sermon; Reginald Noble; Jamal Phillips; Trevor Smith	4:52

== Charts ==
Charts (1996)	Peak position
UK Singles (Official Charts)	59
UK Dance (Official Charts)	4
UK Hip Hop/R&B (Official Charts)	12
US Hot R&B/Hip-Hop Songs (Billboard)	59
US Hot Rap Songs (Billboard)	12
US Hot Dance Music/Maxi-Singles Sales (Billboard)	3
