= The Good Life (FUBU album) =

Compilation album by FUBU Records
- Released: September 25, 2001
- Recorded: 2001
- Genres: Hip hop, R&B
- Label: Universal
- Producer: Carl Brown

Professional ratings
Review scores
| Source | Rating |
|---|---|
| Allmusic | link |

The Good Life is a compilation album released by clothing company FUBU in conjunction with Universal Records. It was released on September 25, 2001 and consisted of a blend of hip hop and contemporary R&B. The Goodlife peaked at 52 on the Billboard 200 and 9 on the Top R&B/Hip-Hop Albums chart. FUBU Partner Carl Brown served as President of FUBU Records and Executive Producer of the album.

One charting single was released, "Fatty Girl" by Ludacris, LL Cool J and Keith Murray. It peaked at 87 on the Billboard Hot 100, 32 on the Hot R&B/Hip-Hop Songs and 6 on the Hot Rap Singles. The second single was "50 Niggaz Deep" by Drunken Master and Lola Damone.

The album was mentioned by FUBU CEO Daymond John on an episode of ABC's Shark Tank. John said he was in the hole for $6 million on the album but the hit single "Fatty Girl" ended up earning $100 million through clothing.

== Track listing ==
| No. | Title | Length |
|---|---|---|
| 1. | "Intro" | 2:40 |
| 2. | "Good Life" (Nate Dogg featuring Nas, and JS of 54th Platoon) | 3:43 |
| 3. | "Ride" (The E.N.D) | 3:51 |
| 4. | "Fatty Girl" (Ludacris, LL Cool J, and Keith Murray) | 3:53 |
| 5. | "Lights, Camera, Action" (Mr. Cheeks) | 4:24 |
| 6. | "Playin' the Game" (JS of 54th Platoon) | 3:51 |
| 7. | "Cool" (Amazin) | 3:54 |
| 8. | "50 Niggaz Deep" (Drunken Master featuring Lola Damone) | 4:26 |
| 9. | "Nasty" (Interlude) | 1:16 |
| 10. | "Girl You Nasty" (TL of 54th Platoon) | 4:26 |
| 11. | "Triumphant" (Mac Don) | 4:15 |
| 12. | "Bad Man Bizness" (Beenie Man) | 5:09 |
| 13. | "Video (Remix)" (India.Arie featuring Super Cat) | 4:02 |
| 14. | "Who's in the House" (Phendi featuring Erick Sermon) | 3:39 |
| 15. | "Ghetto Girl" (Interlude) | 0:30 |
| 16. | "Ghetto Girl" (Joe) | 3:54 |
| 17. | "Set It Off" (Dawn Robinson) | 4:43 |
| 18. | "All of the Things" (Connie McKendrick) | 4:38 |
| 19. | "Outro" | 0:41 |
| Total length: | | 66:37 |
