= Politics & Bullshit =

Politics & Bullsh*t

Studio album by Frankie Cutlass
- Released: February 11, 1997
- Studio: D&D Studios (New York City, NY); House Of Sound (New York City, NY)
- Genre: Hip hop
- Length: 39:44
- Label: Relativity • Violator Records • Epic Records
- Producer: Frankie Cutlass

Frankie Cutlass chronology
The Frankie Cutlass Show (1993)	Politics & Bullsh*t (1997)	New Wine (2004)

Professional ratings
Review scores
Source	Rating
Allmusic	4/5 stars
RapReviews	8.5/10 stars

Politics & Bullsh*t is the second studio album by Puerto Rican-American record producer Frankie Cutlass. It was released on February 11, 1997 via Relativity. It features guest appearances from Big Daddy Kane, Biz Markie, Busta Rhymes, Cocoa Brovaz, Craig G, Doo Wop, Evil Twins, Fat Joe, Heltah Skeltah, June Luva, J Quest, Keith Murray, Kool G Rap, Lost Boyz, M.O.P., Mobb Deep, Rampage, Redman, Roc-City-O, Roxanne Shanté, and Sadat X.

== Track listing ==
No.	Title	Length
1.	"Puerto Rico/Black People"	2:02
2.	"Feel the Vibe" (featuring Doo Wop, Heltah Skeltah & Rampage)	4:14
3.	"Focus" (featuring Lost Boyz & M.O.P.)	3:49
4.	"You & You & You" (featuring June Lover, Redman & Sadat X)	3:54
5.	"Boriquas on da Set" (featuring Doo Wop & Fat Joe)	3:27
6.	"Old School Radio" (Interlude)	0:39
7.	"The Cypher, Pt. 3" (featuring Big Daddy Kane, Biz Markie, Craig G & Roxanne Shanté)	4:15
8.	"Know da Game" (featuring Kool G Rap, M.O.P. & Mobb Deep)	4:28
9.	"Games" (featuring Roc-City-O & J Quest)	4:42
10.	"Pay Ya Dues" (featuring Busta Rhymes, Cocoa Brovaz & Keith Murray)	3:12
11.	"Boriquas on da Set" (featuring Doo Wop, Evil Twins & Fat Joe)	5:02
Total length:		39:44

== Personnel ==
- Frank Malave – main artist, producer, mixing
- Raphael Gonzalez – featured artist (tracks: 2, 5, 11)
- Eric Murray – featured artist (tracks: 3, 8)
- Jamal Gerard Grinnage – featured artist (tracks: 3, 8)
- Joseph Antonio Cartagena – featured artist (tracks: 5, 11)
- Jahmal Bush – featured artist (track 2)
- Sean Price – featured artist (track 2)
- Terrance Kelly – featured artist (track 3)
- Raymond Rogers – featured artist (track 3)
- James Wilson – featured artist (track 4)
- Reginald Noble – featured artist (track 4)
- Derek Murphy – featured artist (track 4)
- Antonio Hardy – featured artist (track 7)
- Marcel Theo Hall – featured artist (track 7)
- Craig Curry – featured artist (track 7)
- Lolita Shanté Gooden – featured artist (track 7)
- Kejuan Muchita – featured artist (track 8)
- Albert Johnson – featured artist (track 8)
- Nathaniel Thomas Wilson – featured artist (track 8)
- Trevor George Smith Jr – featured artist (track 10)
- Tekomin B. Williams – featured artist (track 10)
- Darrell A. Yates, Jr. – featured artist (track 10)
- Keith Murray – featured artist (track 10)
- Ray Ramos – featured artist (track 11)
- True Da Grynch – featured artist (track 11)
- Roc-City-O – featured artist (track 9)
- J Quest – backing vocals (track 9)
- Joseph Anthony Hernandez – scratches (track 7)
- Leo "Swift" Morris – recording, mixing
- Joe Quinde – recording, mixing
- Tony Dawsey – mastering
- Daniel Hastings – photography

== Charts ==
Chart (1997)	Peak position
US Billboard 200	129
US Top R&B/Hip-Hop Albums (Billboard)	32
US Heatseekers Albums (Billboard)	4
