= Sista Sista =

Single by Beverley Knight

from the album Prodigal Sista
- Released: November 1998; November 1999 (re-release)
- Recorded: 1997–1998
- Genre: R&B; Soul
- Length: 4:42 (album version); 4:21 (original mix edit)
- Label: Parlophone
- Songwriters: Beverley Knight; Hawk Wolinski; Rod Gammons
- Producers: Hawk Wolinski; Rod Gammons

Beverley Knight singles chronology
"Rewind (Find a Way)" (1998)	"Sista Sista" (1998)	"Made It Back 99" (1999)

Alternative covers
- CD 2 cover

"Sista Sista (re-release)"

Single by Beverley Knight

from the album Prodigal Sista
- Released: November 1999 (re-release)
- Length: 3:46 (re-release radio edit)

Beverley Knight singles chronology
"Greatest Day" (1999)	"Sista Sista (re-release)" (1999)	"Get Up!" (2001)

Alternative covers
- Re-release UK CD 2 cover

"Sista Sista" was the third single release from British soul singer Beverley Knight's Prodigal Sista album. Knight has previously described the song as the highlight of her career as a lyricist, and is dedicated to two of her friends - "Melissa and Karen", according to the album sleeve. The song was released in November 1998 but it failed to chart in Britain.

== Track list ==
CD 1

1. "Sista Sista"
2. "The Need Of You" (Live From Radio 1's Smokin' Room Session)
3. "Do Right Woman, Do Right Man" (Live From Radio 1's Smokin' Room Session)
4. "Sista Sista" (Full Crew Main Mix)

CD 2

1. "Sista Sista" (Original Mix Edit)
2. "Sista Sista" (Full Crew Main Mix)
3. "Sista Sista" (Definition Of Sound Dancehall Mix)
4. "Sista Sista" (Linslee Mix)
5. "Flavour of the Old School"

== Music video ==
The music video for the original release of "Sista Sista" sees Knight performing alone, with a microphone in front of a red curtain. Directed by 'The New Renaissance' - a previous moniker for directing duo Harvey & Carolyn.

== Sista Sista 99 (re-release) ==
"Sista Sista" was re-released as a single in 1999 and was the sixth and final single from Prodigal Sista. Together with a new video, the song charted at #31 in the UK. The release was designed to capitalise on Knight's success at the 1999 MOBO Awards, where she won two awards for Best R&B Act and Best Album for Prodigal Sista.

== Track list ==
CD 1

1. "Sista Sista (radio edit)
2. "Sista Sista (Remixed by Capital T for SAS)
3. "Sista Sista (R&B Club Remix by SAS)

CD 2

1. "Sista Sista" (radio edit)
2. "Sista Sista" (Curtis and Moore Dub)
3. "Sista Sista" (Curtis and Moore Vocal mix)

== Music video ==
The second video for "Sista Sista" sees Knight performing the song in a smoky bar, with her band.

== Charts ==
Chart (1999)	Peak position
France (SNEP)	46
UK Hip Hop/R&B (Official Charts)	5
UK Singles (Official Charts)	31

== Personnel ==
- Written by Beverley Knight, Hawk Wolinski and Rod Gammons
- Lyrics written by Beverley Knight
- Melody created by Beverley Knight
- Produced by Hawk Wolinski and Rod Gammons
- Additional production provided by Definition of Sound
- All vocals performed and arranged by Beverley Knight

== See also ==
- Beverley Knight discography
