= Rap-Murr-Phobia (The Fear of Real Hip-Hop) =

Studio album by Keith Murray
- Released: July 31, 2007
- Recorded: 2006–2007
- Genre: Hip hop
- Length: 54:29
- Label: Def Squad; L.O.D.; Koch
- Producer: Erick Sermon (also exec.); Mike City; Shuko

Keith Murray chronology
He's Keith Murray (2003)	Rap-Murr-Phobia (The Fear of Real Hip-Hop) (2007)	Lord of the Metaphor (2018)

Professional ratings
Review scores
Source	Rating
AllMusic	4/5 stars
HipHopDX	3/5
RapReviews	7/10
USA Today	3/4 stars

Rap-Murr-Phobia (The Fear of Real Hip-Hop) is the fifth solo studio album by American rapper Keith Murray. It was released on July 31, 2007, through Def Squad and Koch Records. The album was produced by Erick Sermon, Mike City, and Shuko. It features guest appearances from L.O.D., Junior, Baggy Bones, Bosie & Ryze, Def Squad, Jamal, Method Man, Ming Bolla, Taya, Tyrese, and Unique. The album debuted at number 52 on the Billboard 200 and number 7 on the Top R&B/Hip-Hop Albums in the United States, selling 13,000 units in its first week.

== Track listing ==
No.	Title	Writer(s)	Producer(s)	Length
1.	"Walk Up (Skit)" (featuring Kapone)	Keith Murray; Erick Sermon	Erick Sermon	0:30
2.	"Da Fuckery"	K. Murray; Sermon	Erick Sermon	4:13
3.	"Weeble Wobble"	K. Murray; Sermon	Erick Sermon	3:58
4.	"Don't Fuck wit Em" (featuring Kel-Vicious)	K. Murray; Kelly J. Brister; Michael Flowers	Mike City	3:36
5.	"I Love It When It Rains (Skit)"	K. Murray	Erick Sermon	0:51
6.	"U Ain't Nobody" (featuring Redman and Erick Sermon)	K. Murray; Reginald Noble; Sermon	Erick Sermon	3:48
7.	"Do"	K. Murray; Sermon	Erick Sermon	3:57
8.	"Nobody Do It Better" (featuring Tyrese and Junior)	K. Murray; Tyrese Gibson; Sermon	Erick Sermon	4:00
9.	"Hustle On"	K. Murray; Christoph Bauss	Shuko	3:18
10.	"Whatmakeaniggathinkdat" (featuring Lil' Jamal)	K. Murray; Jamal Phillips; Sermon	Erick Sermon	3:47
11.	"What It Is" (featuring Method Man and 50 Grand)	K. Murray; Clifford Smith; Gerald Berlin; Sermon	Erick Sermon	3:16
12.	"We Ridin'" (featuring L.O.D.)	K. Murray; Brister; Berlin; D. Welch; C. Olujobi; D. Murray; Sermon	Erick Sermon	5:00
13.	"Da Beef Murray Show (Skit)" (featuring Taya and Baggy Bones)	K. Murray	Erick Sermon	1:58
14.	"Never Did Shit" (featuring Unique)	K. Murray; Deanna Bennett; Sermon	Erick Sermon	3:42
15.	"Something Like a Model" (featuring Junior)	K. Murray; V. Molina; Sermon	Erick Sermon	4:15
16.	"Late Night" (featuring L.O.D., Ming Bolla, Bosie and Ryze)	K. Murray; Brister; Berlin; Welch; Olujobi; D. Murray; Ming Bolla; M. Anderson; Sermon	Erick Sermon	4:20
Total length:				54:29

Circuit City bonus tracks
No.	Title	Writer(s)	Producer(s)	Length
17.	"Hey Ladies"	K. Murray; Sermon	Erick Sermon
18.	"Real in the Field"	K. Murray; Sermon	Erick Sermon

== Personnel ==
- Keith Murray – main artist
- Tone Kapone – featured artist (track 1)
- Kelly "Kel-Vicious" Brister – featured artist (tracks 4, 12, 16)
- Reginald "Redman" Noble – featured artist (track 6)
- Erick Sermon – featured artist (track 6), producer (tracks 1–3, 5–8, 10–18), mixing (tracks 1, 2, 4–7, 9–16), executive producer
- Tyrese Gibson – featured artist (track 8)
- Junior – featured artist (tracks 8, 15)
- Jamal Phillips – featured artist (track 10)
- Clifford "Method Man" Smith – featured artist (track 11)
- Gerald "50 Grand" Berlin – featured artist (tracks 11, 12, 16)
- D. "DL" Welch – featured artist (tracks 12, 16)
- C. "Olu" Olujobi – featured artist (tracks 12, 16)
- D. Murray – featured artist (tracks 12, 16)
- Taya – featured artist (track 13)
- Baggy Bones – featured artist (track 13)
- Deanna "Uneek" Bennett – featured artist (track 14)
- Ming Bolla – featured artist (track 16)
- Bosie – featured artist (track 16)
- Ryze – featured artist (track 16)
- Michael "Mike City" Flowers – producer (track 4)
- Christoph "Shuko" Bauss – producer (track 9)
- David "Gordo" Strickland – mixing (tracks 1, 2, 4–7, 9–16)
- Tommy Uzzo – mixing (tracks 3, 8)
- Arnold Mischkulnig – mastering (tracks 1, 2, 4–7, 9–16)
- Chris Athens – mastering (tracks 3, 8)
- Paul Grosso – creative director
- Andrew Kelley – art direction, design
- Beatrice Genter – photography
- Mike Schrieber – photography
- Todd Westphal – photography
- Alyson Abbagnaro – A&R

== Charts ==
Chart (2007)	Peak position
US Billboard 200	52
US Top R&B/Hip-Hop Albums (Billboard)	7
