= Last Chance, No Breaks =

Studio album by Jamal
- Released: October 10, 1995
- Recorded: 1994–1995
- Studios: Unique Studios (New York City); D.A.R.P Studios (Atlanta); Rockin Reel Studios (Long Island); Mirror Image Studios (Long Island); Hippie House Studios (Houston)
- Genre: Hip hop
- Labels: Rowdy; Arista
- Producers: Redman; Rockwilder; Easy Mo Bee; Erick Sermon; Mike Dean; Erotic D.; PME

Singles from Last Chance, No Breaks
- 1. "Fades Em All" Released: August 28, 1995; 2. "Keep It Real" Released: February 12, 1996

Professional ratings
Review scores
Source	Rating
AllMusic	2.5/5 stars
Muzik	3/5 stars
The Source	3.5/5 stars

Last Chance, No Breaks is the sole solo studio album by American rapper Jamal. It was released on October 10, 1995, via Rowdy Records. Production was handled by Redman, Rockwilder, Easy Mo Bee, Erick Sermon, Mike Dean, Erotic D. and PME, with Dallas Austin serving as executive producer. It features guest appearances from Redman, Erick Sermon, George Clinton, Keith Murray, L.O.D. and Passion.

The album proved to be a commercial failure, peaking at #198 on the Billboard 200, #37 on the Top R&B/Hip-Hop Albums, and #10 on the Top Heatseekers in the United States. It spawned two charted singles: "Fades Em All" and "Keep It Real". "Fades Em All" was the first single released. The original version of the song was produced by Redman and Rockwilder, while the popular remix was produced by Pete Rock. It peaked at #9 on the Hot Rap Singles, #59 on the Hot R&B/Hip-Hop Singles & Tracks and #40 on the Hot Dance Music/Maxi-Singles Sales. "Keep It Real" made it to #17 on the Hot Rap Singles chart.

== Track listing ==
No.	Title	Producer(s)	Length
1.	"Live Illegal"	Easy Mo Bee	2:59
2.	"Keep It Live"	P.M.E.	5:10
3.	"Situation"	Erick Sermon; Rockwilder	4:17
4.	"Insane Creation" (featuring Redman)	Easy Mo Bee	4:44
5.	"Fades Em All"	Redman; Rockwilder	5:00
6.	"The Game"	Redman	4:17
7.	"Da Come Up"	Mike Dean	4:03
8.	"Don’t Trust No"	Mike Dean	3:56
9.	"Keep It Real"	Erick Sermon	3:24
10.	"Genetic For Terror" (featuring L.O.D.)	Redman; Rockwilder	4:05
11.	"Unfuckwittable" (featuring George Clinton & Passion)	Erotic D.	5:54

Sample credits

- Track 5 samples "Ready to Die" by Notorious B.I.G.
- Track 9 samples "Ribbon in the Sky" by Stevie Wonder
- Track 10 samples "The Boogie Man" by The Jackson 5

== Chart history ==
Chart (1995)	Peak position
US Billboard 200	198
US Top R&B/Hip-Hop Albums (Billboard)	37
US Heatseekers Albums (Billboard)	10
