= Stay Real =

Single by Erick Sermon

from the album No Pressure
- B-side: "Safe Sex"
- Released: September 7, 1993
- Recorded: 1993
- Genre: Hip hop, East Coast hip hop
- Length: 3:59
- Label: Def Jam
- Songwriters: Larry Troutman, Roger Troutman, Erick Sermon
- Producer: Erick Sermon

Erick Sermon singles chronology
"Hittin' Switches" (1993)	"Stay Real" (1993)	"Bomdigi" (1995)

"Stay Real" is a song by American hip hop artist Erick Sermon. The song was released as the second and final single for Sermon's debut album No Pressure on September 7, 1993.

The song peaked at number ninety-two on the Billboard Hot 100 chart.

== Track listing ==
12", Vinyl

1. "Stay Real" (LP Version) - 3:59
2. "Stay Real" (Instrumental) - 3:59
3. "Safe Sex" (LP Version) - 3:49
4. "Safe Sex" (Instrumental) - 3:49
5. "Rock Da House" - 2:34

== Chart performance ==
Chart (1993)	Peak position
U.S. Billboard Hot 100	92
U.S. Hot Dance Music/Maxi-Singles Sales	2
U.S. Hot R&B/Hip-Hop Singles & Tracks	52
U.S. Hot Rap Singles	1

== Personnel ==
Information taken from Discogs.

- engineering – George "Catfish" Pappas, Darren Prindle
- mastering – Howie Weinberg
- mixing – George "Catfish" Pappas
- production – Erick Sermon
- vocals – Debra Killings
