= Rewind (Find a Way) =

Single by Beverley Knight

from the album Prodigal Sista
- Released: August 1998
- Recorded: 1997–1998
- Genre: R&B; Soul
- Length: 4:28
- Label: Parlophone
- Songwriters: Beverley Knight; Neville Thomas; Pule Pheto
- Producers: Neville Thomas; Pule Pheto

Beverley Knight singles chronology
"Made It Back" (1998)	"Rewind (Find a Way)" (1998)	"Sista Sista" (1998)

Alternative covers
- CD 2 cover

Rewind (Find a Way) was the second single to be released of Beverley Knight's second studio album, Prodigal Sista. After the success of the first single Made It Back, which peaked at #21 in UK Singles Chart, the follow-up proved to be disappointing after it peaked at #40.

The accompanying video for the single was one of the first videos by acclaimed director Dawn Shadforth.

== Track list ==
CD 1

1. "Rewind (Find a Way)"
2. "The Need Of You" (live from Radio 1's Smokin' Room Session)
3. "Do Right Woman, Do Right Man" (live from Radio 1's Smokin' Room Session)

CD 2

1. "Rewind (Find A Way)"
2. "Rewind (Find A Way)" (Dodge's Master mix)
3. "Rewind (Find A Way)" (Erick Sermon mix)

== Charts ==
Chart	Peak Position
UK Hip Hop/R&B (Official Charts)	14
UK Singles (Official Charts)	40

== Personnel ==
- Written by Beverley Knight, Neville Thomas and Pule Pheto
- Lyrics written by Beverley Knight
- Melody created by Beverley Knight
- Produced and arranged by Neville Thomas and Pule Pheto
- All vocals performed and arranged by Beverley Knight
- Mixed by Pete Mocran
- Recorded at 2B3 Akoustics & Battery Studios

== See also ==
- Beverley Knight discography
