= Full Cooperation =

Single by Def Squad

from the album El Niño
- Released: June 2, 1998
- Genre: East Coast hip hop
- Length: 3:32
- Label: Def Jam
- Songwriters: Erick Sermon; Reginald Noble; Keith Murray; Harold Ousley
- Producer: Erick Sermon

Erick Sermon singles chronology
"Welcome" (1996)	"Full Cooperation" (1998)	"Focus" (2000)

Redman singles chronology
"Made It Back" (1998)	"Full Cooperation" (1998)	"How Deep Is Your Love" (1998)

Keith Murray singles chronology
"The Rhyme" (1996)	"Full Cooperation" (1998)	"Home Alone" (1998)

Music video
- "Full Cooperation" on YouTube

"Full Cooperation" is a song written and performed by American hip hop group Def Squad. It was released on June 2, 1998 through Def Jam Recordings as the only single from the group's sole studio album El Niño. Production was handled by member Erick Sermon, who utilised a sample from Houston Person's "Pretty Please".

Each member's verse in the Steve Carr-directed music video is inspired by Eddie Murphy films: Keith Murray's verse incorporates scenes from Another 48 Hrs., Erick Sermon's verse incorporates scenes from The Nutty Professor and Redman's verse incorporates scenes from Trading Places.

== Track listing ==
No.	Title	Length
1.	"Full Cooperation" (Radio Edit)	3:32
2.	"Full Cooperation" (LP Version)	3:28
3.	"Full Cooperation" (TV Track)	3:27

== Charts ==
Chart (1998)	Peak position
US Canadian Digital Song Sales (Billboard)	11
US Hot R&B/Hip-Hop Songs (Billboard)	51
US R&B/Hip-Hop Airplay (Billboard)	63
US Bubbling Under Hot 100 (Billboard)	5
US Dance Singles Sales (Billboard)	25

== Personnel ==
- Keith Murray – vocals
- Erick Sermon – vocals, producer
- Reginald "Redman" Noble – vocals
- Tommy Uzo – mixing
