= Get Lifted (song) =

Single by Keith Murray

from the album The Most Beautifullest Thing in This World
- B-side: "Pay Per View"
- Released: January 27, 1995
- Recorded: 1993–1994
- Genre: Hip hop
- Length: 4:03
- Label: Jive
- Songwriters: Keith Murray; Erick Sermon; Harry Wayne Casey; Richard Finch
- Producer: Erick Sermon

Keith Murray singles chronology
"The Most Beautifullest Thing in This World" (1994)	"Get Lifted" (1995)	"This That Hit" (1995)

Music video
- "Get Lifted" on YouTube

Professional ratings
Review scores
Source	Rating
AllMusic	3/5 stars

"Get Lifted" is a song by American rapper Keith Murray. It was released on January 27, 1995, through Jive Records as the second single off of Murray's debut studio album The Most Beautifullest Thing in This World. Written by Murray and Erick Sermon, it was produced by the latter, who also provided background vocals. The song utilizes a sample of "I Get Lifted" performed by George McCrae and its remixes contain a sample of "Close The Door" performed by Teddy Pendergrass. The single peaked at 71 on the Billboard Hot 100 and 7 on the Hot Rap Singles in the United States.

== Track listing ==
No.	Title	Writer(s)	Length
1.	"Get Lifted" (radio version)	Keith Murray; Erick Sermon; Harry Wayne Casey; Richard Finch	3:59
2.	"Get Lifted" (Erick Sermon's remix)	Murray; Sermon; Gamble and Huff	4:18
3.	"Get Lifted" (LP instrumental)	Murray; Sermon; Casey; Finch	4:03
4.	"Get Lifted" (LP version)	Murray; Sermon; Casey; Finch	4:03
5.	"Get Lifted" (remix instrumental)	Murray; Sermon; Gamble; Huff	4:18
6.	"Pay Per View" (featuring Passion, LBM, Kel-Vicious and Kiki Hitsville)	Murray; Passion Johnson; Raymond Jones; Kelly J. Brister; Sermon	3:00

== Charts ==
Chart (1995)	Peak position
UK Hip Hop/R&B (Official Charts) with "The Most Beautifullest Thing in This World"	21
US Billboard Hot 100	71
US Dance Singles Sales (Billboard)	4
US Hot R&B/Hip-Hop Songs (Billboard)	33
US Hot Rap Songs (Billboard)	7
