= Can't Wait =

Single by Redman

from the album Dare Iz a Darkside
- Released: February 7, 1995
- Recorded: 1994
- Genre: East Coast hip hop; hardcore hip hop
- Length: 3:43
- Label: Def Jam
- Songwriter(s): Reggie Noble; Erick Sermon; Rick James; Antonio Hardy
- Producer(s): Erick Sermon; Reggie Noble (co.)

Redman singles chronology
"Rockafella" (1994)	"Can't Wait" (1995)	"Where Am I?" (1995)

Music video
- "Can't Wait" on YouTube

"Can't Wait" is the second single released from Redman's second album, Dare Iz a Darkside. It is produced by Erick Sermon and Redman, and contains samples from "All Night Long" by Mary Jane Girls, "Caribbean Nights" by Bob James and "Just Rhymin' With Biz" by Big Daddy Kane and Biz Markie.

The song reached number five on Hot Dance Music/Maxi-Singles Sales charts, number eleven on the Hot Rap Singles chart, number sixty one on the Hot R&B/Hip-Hop Singles & Tracks chart and number ninety-four on the Billboard Hot 100 chart. It is the first of four Redman songs to reach the Billboard Hot 100 chart.

In a March 2012 interview with Complex, Erick Sermon mentioned producer Mike City used the production of Redman's "Can't Wait" as the inspiration behind two of his hits- "I Wish" by Carl Thomas as well as "Full Moon" by singer/actress Brandy.

== Single track list ==
=== A-side ===
1. Can't Wait (LP version) (3:43)
2. Can't Wait (clean version) (3:53)

=== B-side ===
1. A Million And 1 Buddah Spots (LP version) (3:23)
2. Can't Wait (instrumental) (3:40)
3. Can't Wait (Acapella) (3:50)

== Charts ==
Chart (1995)	Peak position
US Billboard Hot 100	94
US Hot R&B/Hip-Hop Songs (Billboard)	61
US Hot Rap Songs (Billboard)	11
US Dance Singles Sales (Billboard)	5
