= Made It Back =

Single by Beverley Knight

Single by Beverley Knight featuring Redman

from the album Prodigal Sista
- Released: May 1998
- Recorded: 1997–1998
- Genre: R&B; Soul
- Length: 4:08
- Label: Parlophone
- Songwriters: Knight, Drakes, Shorten, Noble
- Producer: Dj Dodge

Beverley Knight singles chronology
"Cast All Your Cares" (1997)	"Made It Back" (1998)	"Rewind (Find a Way)" (1998)

Redman singles chronology
"4, 3, 2, 1" (1997)	"Made It Back" (1998)	"Full Cooperation" (1998)

"Made It Back" is a song by Beverley Knight, released as the first single from her second studio album, Prodigal Sista. It was also the first single Knight released on EMI controlled Parlophone Records after she signed a four album deal with the label in 1997 after disagreements with her previous label, Dome Records. The release instantly proved that Knight had made the right decision after it entered the UK Singles Chart at #21 – her highest charting single up to that point. Featuring US rap star Redman, the song was nominated for Best Single at the 1998 MOBO Awards in London, which Knight lost out on to Another Level's "Freak Me". However, Knight went on to win Best R&B Act.

== Track list ==
CD:

1. "Made It Back" (featuring Redman)
2. "Made It Back" (C Swing Mix)
3. "Made It Back" (Brooklyn Funk Club Mix)
4. "Made It Back" (Without Rap)

The single also included an enhanced section featuring the video for Made It Back.

== Music video ==
The video for "Made It Back" was filmed in New York City and sees Knight walking through deserted streets. The deserted streets depict the lyrics "I made it back, from a place called nowhere". This version was directed by Matt Broadley.

== Charts ==
Chart	Peak Position
Europe (Eurochart Hot 100)	79
Scotland (Official Charts Company)	60
UK Singles (Official Charts Company)	21
UK R&B (Official Charts Company)	4

== Personnel ==
- Written by Knight, Drakes, Shorten, Noble
- Lyrics written by Beverley Knight
- Melody created by Beverley Knight
- Produced by Dodge
- All vocals performed and arranged by Beverley Knight
- Additional vocals provided by Redman
- Recorded at Inside Sound Studio, Roundhouse Recording Studios and Mirror Image West NYC Studios
- Engineered by Sheridan Tongue, Tommy Uzzo and Jon P.
- Mixed by Dodge and Jon P.

== Made It Back 99 ==
"Made It Back 99"

Single by Beverley Knight featuring Redman

from the album Prodigal Sista
- Released: April 1999
- Recorded: 1999
- Genre: R&B; pop
- Length: 3:39
- Label: Parlophone
- Songwriters: Knight, Drakes, Shorten, Noble
- Producers: TNT aka the don from definition of sound Mike Spencer

Beverley Knight singles chronology
"Sista Sista" (1998)	"Made It Back 99" (1999)	"Greatest Day" (1999)

Redman singles chronology
"Full Cooperation" (1998)	"'Made It Back" (1998)	"How Deep Is Your Love" (1998)

Audio sample
- Made It Back '99 (TNT Good Times No Rap): file; help

Alternative cover
- UK CD: 2 single cover

"Made It Back 99" is a remixed version of the first single from the Beverley Knight's second studio album, Prodigal Sista. The song, released in April 1999, was the first to be taken from a repackaged version of the album. Made It Back 99 contained the same lyrics and vocals of the original release, but instead featured a more funk/R&B induced production provided by TNT and Mike Spencer, who introduced a sample of Chic's "Good Times" into the song. The single became Knight's first top 20 single in the United Kingdom when it peaked at #19 upon its release. It was supported by a rereleased version of Prodigal Sista, which contained the single and two other remixes. A second promotional video was also created, but like the original, did not feature Redman.

=== Track list ===
CD 1:

1. "Made It Back '99" (featuring Redman) (TNT Good Times Mix)
2. "Think"
3. "Flavour of the Old School"

CD 2:

1. "Made It Back '99" (Featuring Redman & Specialist) (TNT Good Times 12" Mix)
2. "Made It Back '99" (TNT Good Times 7" Mix – video version, without rap)
3. "Made It Back '99" (Booker T Night Time Dub)
4. "Made It Back" (featuring Redman) (Original Album Version)

=== Charts ===
Chart	Peak Position
Europe (Eurochart Hot 100)	82
France (SNEP)	34
Scotland (Official Charts Company)	36
UK Singles (Official Charts Company)	19
UK R&B (Official Charts Company)	5

=== Music video ===
The video for "Made It Back 99" was filmed in an underground club, seemingly in a deserted warehouse with many extras dancing, creating a party atmosphere. This version was shot by Jake Nava.

=== Personnel ===
- Written by Knight, Drakes, Shorten, Noble
- Lyrics written by Beverley Knight
- Melody created by Beverley Knight
- Produced by TNT aka Definition of Sound and Mike Spencer
- All vocals performed and arranged by Beverley Knight
- Additional vocals provided by Redman
- Recorded at Inside Sound Studio, Roundhouse Studios and Mirror Image West NYC Studios
- Engineered by Sheridan Tongue, Tommy Uzzo and Jon P.
- Mixed by Dodge and Jon P.

"Made It Back 99" contains a sample of "Good Times", performed by Chic and written by Edwards & Rodgers (1979)

== See also ==
- Beverley Knight discography
