= Enigma (Keith Murray album) =

Studio album by Keith Murray
- Released: November 26, 1996
- Recorded: November 1995 – September 1996
- Studio: Mirror Image (Dix Hills, New York)
- Genre: East Coast hip hop
- Length: 49:42
- Label: Jive
- Producers: Erick Sermon (also exec.); Rod 'KP' Kirkpatrick; the Ummah; Ty Fyffe

Keith Murray chronology
The Most Beautifullest Thing in This World (1994)	Enigma (1996)	El Niño (1998)

Singles from Enigma
- 1. "The Rhyme" Released: October 21, 1996

Professional ratings
Review scores
Source	Rating
AllMusic	4/5 stars
RapReviews	8/10
The Source	3.5/5 stars

Enigma is the second solo studio album by American rapper Keith Murray. It was released on November 26, 1996, via Jive Records. The recording sessions took place at Mirror Image Recordings in Long Island. The album was produced by Erick Sermon, who also served as executive producer, Ty Fyffe, the Ummah, and Rod 'KP' Kirkpatrick. It features guest appearances from 50 Grand, Kel-Vicious, Erick Sermon, Busta Rhymes, Dave Hollister, Jamal, and Redman. The album peaked at number thirty-nine on the Billboard 200 and number six on the Top R&B/Hip-Hop Albums chart in the United States. Its lead single "The Rhyme" made it to number 59 on the Hot R&B/Hip-Hop Songs, number 12 on the Hot Rap Songs and number 3 on the Hot Dance Music/Maxi-Singles Sales charts.

"Whut's Happenin'" is not included on the Spotify release.

== Track listing ==
No.	Title	Writer(s)	Producer(s)	Length
1.	"Intro"	Erick Sermon		1:36
2.	"Call My Name"	Keith Murray; Sermon; Mike Hogan	Erick Sermon	3:42
3.	"Manifique" (Original Rules)	Murray; Sermon; Keith Crouch; Kevin T. Jones; Rahsaan Patterson	Erick Sermon	3:52
4.	"Whut's Happinin'"	Murray; Sermon; Marvin Gaye; Renaldo Benson	Erick Sermon	3:54
5.	"The Rhyme"	Murray; Sermon; Frankie Beverly	Erick Sermon	3:37
6.	"Dangerous Ground" (featuring 50 Grand)	Murray; Gerald Berlin; James Yancey	The Ummah	3:40
7.	"Rhymin' with Kel" (featuring Kel-Vicious)	Murray; Kelly J. Brister; Tyrone Fyffe; Sermon; Gil Karson	Sugarless; Erick Sermon (co.)	2:36
8.	"What a Feelin'"	Murray; Sermon; Fyffe	Erick Sermon; Sugarless	3:48
9.	"Hot to Def"	Murray; Sermon; Fyffe; Bruce Napier; Andrew Noland; Greg Webster; Walter Morrison; Marvin Pierce; Marshall Jones; Ralph Middlebrooks; Leroy Bonner	Erick Sermon; Sugarless	3:35
10.	"Yeah" (featuring Erick Sermon, Busta Rhymes, Jamal and Redman)	Murray; Sermon; Trevor Smith; Jamal Phillips; Reginald Noble; Fyffe	Sugarless; Erick Sermon (co.)	4:52
11.	"Love L.O.D." (featuring 50 Grand and Kel-Vicious)	Murray; Berlin; Brister; Rod Kirkpatrick; Sermon	Rod "K.P." Kirkpatrick; Erick Sermon (co.)	3:11
12.	"To My Mans" (featuring Dave Hollister)	Murray; Dave Hollister; Sermon	Erick Sermon	3:37
13.	"World Be Free"	Murray; Sermon	Erick Sermon	3:41
14.	"The Rhyme (Remix)"	Murray; Sermon; Beverly	The Ummah	4:01
Total length:				49:42

== Personnel ==
- Keith Omar Murray – main artist
- Gerald "50 Grand" Berlin – featured artist (tracks 6, 11)
- Kelly "Kel-Vicious" Brister – featured artist (tracks 7, 11)
- Erick Sermon – featured artist (track 10), backing vocals (tracks 8, 12), producer (tracks 2–5, 8, 9, 12, 13), co-producer (tracks 7, 10, 11), executive producer
- Jamal Phillips – featured artist (track 10)
- Reginald "Redman" Noble – featured artist (track 10)
- Trevor "Busta Rhymes" Smith Jr. – featured artist (track 10)
- Dave Hollister – featured artist (track 12)
- Evan "DJ EV" Hitch – scratches
- The Ummah – producer (tracks 6, 14)
- Tyrone "Sugarless" Fyffe – producer (tracks 7–10)
- Rodrick Kirkpatrick – producer (track 11)
- Troy Hightower – engineering, mixing
- Rick St. Hillaire – engineering, mixing, remixing
- Mike Hogan – engineering
- Tim Donovan – engineering assistant
- Mike Rew – engineering assistant
- Tony Dawsey – mastering
- Jackie Murphy – art direction, design
- Russell Ward – cover image
- Daniel Hastings – photography
- Tanisha Jones – stylist

== Charts ==
=== Weekly charts ===
Chart (1996)	Peak position
UK R&B Albums (Official Charts)	26
US Billboard 200	39
US Top R&B/Hip-Hop Albums (Billboard)	6

=== Year-end charts ===
Chart (1997)	Position
US Top R&B/Hip-Hop Albums (Billboard)	78
