= Double or Nothing (Erick Sermon album) =

Studio album by Erick Sermon
- Released: November 7, 1995
- Recorded: 1994–1995
- Genre: East Coast hip hop
- Length: 47:13
- Label: Rush Associated Labels; Def Jam
- Producer: Erick Sermon; Redman; Rockwilder; Rod 'KP' Kirkpatrick; Ty Fyffe

Erick Sermon chronology
No Pressure (1993)	Double or Nothing (1995)	Insomnia (1996)

Singles from Double or Nothing
- 1. "Bomdigi" Released: October 17, 1995; 2. "Welcome" Released: January 23, 1996

Professional ratings
Review scores
Source	Rating
AllMusic	4/5 stars
Entertainment Weekly	B−
Muzik	4/5 stars
RapReviews	8/10

Double or Nothing is the second solo album by the American rapper and record producer Erick Sermon. It was released on November 7, 1995, via Def Jam Recordings. The album was produced by Sermon, Redman, Rockwilder, Rod 'KP' Kirkpatrick, and Ty Fyffe. It features contributions from Keith Murray, Redman, Jazze Pha, Passion, and Roz. Double or Nothing spawned two singles: "Bomdigi" and "Welcome".

The album peaked at No. 35 on the Billboard 200 and at No. 6 on the Top R&B/Hip-Hop Albums chart in the United States.

The songs "Tell 'Em," "Boy Meets World" and "Focus" are not included on the Spotify edition.

== Track listing ==
No.	Title	Producer(s)	Length
1.	"Intro" (Skit)	Erick Sermon	1:01
2.	"Bomdigi"	Erick Sermon; Sugarless (co.)	3:34
3.	"Freak Out" (featuring Redman)	Rod 'KP' Kirkpatrick; Erick Sermon (co.)	3:07
4.	"In the Heat"	Erick Sermon; Sugarless (co.)	2:09
5.	"Tell 'Em" (featuring Roz & Keith Murray)	Erick Sermon; Rod 'KP' Kirkpatrick (co.)	2:35
6.	"In the Studio" (Skit)	Erick Sermon	1:01
7.	"Boy Meets World"	Rockwilder; Erick Sermon (co.)	3:16
8.	"Welcome" (featuring Keith Murray)	Rockwilder; Erick Sermon (co.)	3:56
9.	"Live in the Backyard" (Skit)	Erick Sermon	2:21
10.	"Set It Off" (featuring Keith Murray)	Erick Sermon	3:34
11.	"Focus"	Erick Sermon	3:53
12.	"Move On" (featuring Redman and Passion)	Erick Sermon; Sugarless (co.)	3:56
13.	"Smooth Thought" (Skit)	Erick Sermon	0:31
14.	"Do Your Thing"	Redman; Erick Sermon (co.)	3:35
15.	"Man Above"	Erick Sermon	4:01
16.	"The Message" (Skit)	Erick Sermon	0:49
17.	"Open Fire" (featuring Redman and Keith Murray)	Erick Sermon	3:54
Total length:			47:13

== Personnel ==
- Erick Sermon – main artist, producer (tracks: 1–2, 4–6, 9–13, 16–17), co-producer (tracks: 3, 7, 8, 14), executive producer
- Reginald Noble – featured artist (tracks: 3, 12, 17), producer (tracks: 14, 15)
- Keith Omar Murray – featured artist (tracks: 5, 8, 10, 17)
- Roslyn "Roz" Noble – featured artist (track 5)
- Passion Johnson – featured artist (track 12)
- Crystal Gamble – vocals (track 2)
- Dana Stinson – vocals (track 7), producer (tracks: 7, 8)
- Aaron Hall – vocals (track 8)
- Phalon Anton Alexander – vocals (tracks: 9, 15)
- Tyrone Fyffe – vocals (track 12), co-producer (tracks: 2, 4, 12)
- Rod 'KP' Kirkpatrick – producer (track 3), co-producer (track 5)
- Troy Hightower – engineering

== Chart history ==
Chart (1995)	Peak position
US Billboard 200	35
US Top R&B/Hip-Hop Albums (Billboard)	6
