= Incredible (Keith Murray song) =

Single by Keith Murray featuring LL Cool J

from the album It's a Beautiful Thing
- Released: September 15, 1998
- Recorded: 1998
- Studio: Mirror Image Recorders (Dix Hills, NY)
- Genre: Hip hop
- Length: 3:00
- Label: Jive
- Songwriters: Keith Murray; James Todd Smith; Erick Sermon; James Brown; Charles Bobbit; Fred Wesley
- Producer: Erick Sermon

Keith Murray singles chronology
| "Shorty (You Keep Playin' with My Mind)" (1998) | "Incredible" (1998) | "Fatty Girl" (2001) |

LL Cool J singles chronology
| "Candy" (1998) | "Incredible" (1998) | "Say What" (1999) |

Music video
- "Incredible" on YouTube

Professional ratings
Review scores
| Source | Rating |
|---|---|
| AllMusic | 1.5/5 stars |

"Incredible" is a song by American rappers Keith Murray and LL Cool J. It was released on September 15, 1998 through Jive Records as the only single from Murray's third studio album It's a Beautiful Thing. Recording sessions took place at Mirror Image Recorders in Dix Hills. Production was handled by Erick Sermon, who used a sample from James Brown's song "Sportin' Life". The single peaked at 70 on the Hot R&B/Hip-Hop Songs and 27 on the Hot Rap Songs in the United States.

== Music video ==
A music video directed by Diane Martel was released for the song. The music video, a parody of comics' Batman and Robin, starred Murray as the Robin-inspired "Lyrical Lexicon" and Redman as the Batman-inspired "Funk Doctor Spock". The two faced LL Cool J as the duo's archnemesis based on The Joker called "The Last Laugher", Erick Sermon as "The Green Eyed Bandit", Craig Mack as "Sinister James", and the Catwoman-styled character "Chickenhead".

== Samples ==
A sample of the song was used in Army of the Pharaohs's song "The Ultimatum" from the album The Unholy Terror.

== Track listing ==
| No. | Title | Length |
|---|---|---|
| 1. | "Incredible" (Clean Version) | 3:00 |
| 2. | "Incredible" (Instrumental) | 3:00 |
| 3. | "Incredible" (Album Version) | 3:00 |
| 4. | "Incredible" (Acapella) | 3:00 |

== Personnel ==
- Keith Omar Murray – vocals
- James Todd "LL Cool J" Smith – vocals
- Erick Sermon – producer
- Marc Berto – engineering, mixing
- Camillo Rodriguez – engineering assistant
- Dave O'Donnell – engineering assistant
- Jackie Murphy – art direction
- Jason Claiborne – design
- Michael Benabib – photography
- Damon "Smooth" Hart – management
- Rashad El-Amin – management

== Chart performance ==
| Chart (1998) | Peak position |
|---|---|
| UK Singles (Official Charts) | 52 |
| UK Dance (Official Charts) | 14 |
| UK Hip Hop/R&B (Official Charts) | 8 |
| UK Indie (Official Charts) | 13 |
| US Hot R&B/Hip-Hop Songs (Billboard) | 70 |
| US Hot Rap Songs (Billboard) | 27 |
