= Rockafella (song) =

Single by Redman

from the album Dare Iz a Darkside
- Released: September 29, 1994
- Genre: Hip hop
- Length: 4:43
- Label: Rush
- Songwriter(s): Reginald Noble; George Clinton Jr.; Bernard G. Worrell; William Collins; Leon Haywood
- Producer(s): Redman

Redman singles chronology
"Tonight's da Night" (1993)	"Rockafella" (1994)	"Can't Wait" (1994)

Music video
- "Rockafella" on YouTube

"Rockafella" is a hip hop song written and performed by American rapper Redman. It was released in 1994 via Rush Associated Labels as the lead single from the artist's second studio album Dare Iz a Darkside. Produced by Redman himself, it contains samples from Leon Haywood's "I Want'a Do Something Freaky to You" and Parliament's "Flashlight". The official remix version was done by Erick Sermon.

The song is dedicated to the memory of Brooklyn rapper Rockafella.

== Track listing ==
No.	Title	Writer(s)	Producer(s)	Length
1.	"Rockafella" (LP Version)	Reginald Noble; George Clinton Jr.; Bernard G. Worrell; William Collins; Leon Haywood	Redman	4:43
2.	"Rockafella" (LP Instrumental)	Noble; Clinton Jr.; Worrell; Collins; Haywood	Redman	4:01
3.	"Rockafella" (Remix Version)	Noble; Erick Sermon; Clinton Jr.; Worrell; Collins; Haywood	Erick Sermon	4:43
4.	"Rockafella" (Remix Instrumental)	Noble; Sermon; Clinton Jr.; Worrell; Collins; Haywood	Erick Sermon	4:44

== Charts ==
Chart (1994)	Peak position
US Hot R&B/Hip-Hop Songs (Billboard)	62
US Hot Rap Songs (Billboard)	10
US Dance Singles Sales (Billboard)	3
