= It's a Beautiful Thing (album) =

Studio album by Keith Murray
- Released: January 12, 1999
- Recorded: 1997–1998
- Studio: Mirror Image (Dix Hills, New York)
- Genre: East Coast hip hop
- Length: 51:50
- Label: Jive
- Producer: Erick Sermon (also exec.)

Keith Murray chronology
El Niño (1998)	It's a Beautiful Thing (1999)	He's Keith Murray (2003)

Singles from It's a Beautiful Thing
- 1. "Incredible" Released: September 15, 1998

Professional ratings
Review scores
Source	Rating
AllMusic	3/5 stars
The Source	3.5/5 stars

It's a Beautiful Thing is the third solo studio album by American rapper Keith Murray. It was released on January 12, 1999, via Jive Records, making it his final record for the label. The recording sessions took place at Mirror Image Recording Studios in Dix Hills, New York. The album was produced by Erick Sermon, who also served as executive producer. It features guest appearances from Déjà Vu, Canibus, Erick Sermon, LL Cool J, Redman, and Too $hort. The album peaked at number thirty-nine on the Billboard 200 and number nine on the Top R&B/Hip-Hop Albums chart in the US. Its single "Incredible" reached number 70 on the Hot R&B/Hip-Hop Songs and number 36 on the Hot Rap Songs.

The recording of the album began during the difficult times of Murray's legal and financial troubles, along with his desire to leave the label. However, the album was unfinished when Murray went into incarceration, with the label deciding to complete and release the album despite Murray's disapproval. AllMusic's Stephen Thomas Erlewine considered the album to be a rather indistinctive one in Murray's discography, but did state that "there's enough to make It's a Beautiful Thing a reasonably entertaining listen, even if they aren't enough to make it memorable".

== Track listing ==
No.	Title	Writer(s)	Length
1.	"Intro"	Erick Sermon; Ryo Kawasaki	0:53
2.	"When I Rap"	Keith Murray; Sermon; James Todd Smith; Clifford Smith; Earl Simmons; Germaine Williams	3:21
3.	"Incredible" (featuring LL Cool J)	Murray; J.T. Smith; Sermon; James Brown; Charles Bobbit; Fred Wesley	3:03
4.	"Some Shit" (featuring Canibus and Déjà Vu)	Murray; Williams; D. Everett; Sermon; Ennio Morricone	3:14
5.	"Bodega Skit"	Murray; Sermon	0:40
6.	"Slap Somebody"	Murray; Sermon	3:57
7.	"Secret Indictment"	Murray; Sermon; G. Raeford	3:41
8.	"Radio"	Murray; Sermon; Douglas Davis; G. Griffin; Aaron Hall; Timmy Gatling; El DeBarge; William DeBarge; Etterlene Jordan	3:50
9.	"Intersection"	Murray; Sermon; Parrish J. Smith	3:35
10.	"Shut the Fuck Up"	Murray; Sermon	2:15
11.	"Interlude"	Murray	0:36
12.	"Media"	Murray; Sermon; Herbert Hancock; Reginald Noble; Harold Ousley	3:30
13.	"Life on the Street"	Will Jennings; Joe Sample	4:04
14.	"Ride wit Us" (featuring Erick Sermon, Redman and Too $hort)	Murray; Sermon; Noble; Todd Shaw	3:51
15.	"Jungle Boogie"	Ronald Bell; Claydes Charles Smith; Robert Spike Mickens; Donald Boyce; Rick Westfield; Dennis Thomas; Robert Bell; George Brown	0:56
16.	"High as Hell"	Murray; Sermon; Ray Jackson	3:22
17.	"Bad Day"	Murray; Sermon; Ronald Isley; Ernie Isley; Rudolph Isley; Marvin Isley; O'Kelly Isley Jr.; Chris Jasper	3:55
18.	"A Message from Keith"	Murray	2:05
19.	"My Life" (featuring Déjà Vu)	Murray; Everett; Sermon; Eddie Holland; Lamont Dozier; Brian Holland	3:45
Total length:			51:50

== Personnel ==
- Keith Omar Murray – vocals
- James Todd "LL Cool J" Smith – vocals (track 3)
- D. "Déjà Vu" Everett – vocals (tracks 4, 19)
- Germaine "Canibus" Williams – vocals (track 4)
- Erick Sermon – vocals (track 14), producer, executive producer
- Reginald "Redman" Noble – vocals (track 14)
- Todd "Too $hort" Shaw – vocals (track 14)
- Chaz Harper – digital editing
- Mark Berto – recording, mixing
- Troy Hightower – recording, mixing
- Ivan 'Doc' Rodriguez – mixing
- Camillo Rodriguez – assistant engineering
- Dave O'Donnell – assistant engineering
- Tony Dawsey – mastering
- Chris Tricarico – project coordination
- Damon "Smooth" Hart – management
- Rashad El-Amin – management

== Charts ==
Chart (1999)	Peak position
UK Independent Albums (OCC)	32
UK R&B Albums (OCC)	24
US Billboard 200	39
US Top R&B/Hip-Hop Albums (Billboard)	9
