= Prodigal Sista =

Studio album by Beverley Knight
- Released: 17 August 1998
- Genre: R&B; soul; neo soul
- Length: 54:23
- Label: Parlophone
- Producer: 2B3; Ayatollah; Definition of Sound; Dodge; Don-E; Carl McIntosh; Mike Spencer; Hawk Wolinski

Beverley Knight chronology
The B-Funk (1995)	Prodigal Sista (1998)	Who I Am (2002)

Singles from Prodigal Sista
- 1. "Made It Back" Released: 18 May 1998; 2. "Rewind (Find a Way)" Released: 10 August 1998; 3. "Sista Sista" Released: 2 November 1998; 4. "Made It Back 99" Released: 5 April 1999; 5. "Greatest Day" Released: 5 July 1999; 6. "Sista Sista (Re-Release)" Released: 22 November 1999

Prodigal Sista is the second studio album by British R&B singer-songwriter Beverley Knight. It was released by Parlophone on 17 August 1998 in the United Kingdom. The album was the first to be released by Knight under her new contract with label, with whom she had signed a four album deal with in 1997 after leaving her previous label, Dome Records. The lyrics on the album were written entirely by Knight (with the exception of "Sista Sista" which was co-written with Hawk Wolinski), as was the creation of melodies and vocal arrangements.

== Reception ==
Professional ratings
Review scores
Source	Rating
Q	4/5 stars
The Independent	(Positive)

The critical acclaim of the album proved to be widespread, with Q magazine calling the album "a triumph not only of Knight’s musical vision but also of the strength in her character" and The Times remarking "Prodigal Sista is a joy to hear – her vocal and intricate self devised and performed harmonies can make you catch your breath in wonderment". The success of the album was solidified at the 1999 MOBO Awards in London where Knight was named Best R&B Act and Prodigal Sista beat off competition from FanMail (TLC) and The Miseducation of Lauryn Hill (Lauryn Hill) to be named Best Album.

== Chart performance ==
The success of the album proved to be much greater than her debut, The B-Funk, which peaked at #145 in Britain. Prodigal Sista peaked at #42 and was awarded a Gold Disk by the BPI for sales of over 100,000 in Britain.

== Track listing ==
Prodigal Sista – Standard edition
No.	Title	Writer(s)	Producer(s)	Length
1.	"Intro (Good Morning World)"			0:29
2.	"Made It Back" (featuring Redman)	Knight; Nile Rodgers; Bernard Edwards; Jonathan Shorten; Reggie Noble; Roger Drakes	Dodge	4:08
3.	"Rewind (Find a Way)"	Knight; Pule Pheto; Neville Thomas	2B3 Productions	4:28
4.	"Damn"	Knight; Pheto; Thomas	2B3 Productions	4:52
5.	"A.W.O.L."	Knight; Carl McIntosh	McIntosh	4:31
6.	"Sista Sista"	Knight; Hawk Wolinski; Rob Gammons	Wolinski; Definition of Sound	4:43
7.	"Strong Hand"	Knight; Lamont Dorrell	Ayatollah; McIntosh	3:20
8.	"Greatest Day"	Knight; Mark Birts; Terry Price; Nicholas Martinelli; Pheto; Thomas	Mike Spencer	4:16
9.	"That's Alright"	Knight; Pheto; Thomas	2B3 Productions	4:19
10.	"Tomorrow"	Knight; Donald McLean	Wolinski; Don-E	4:42
11.	"Send Me, Move Me, Love Me"	Knight; Pheto; Thomas	2B3 Productions	5:05
12.	"The Need of You"	Knight; Carl McIntosh	Dodge	3:45
13.	"Good Morning World"	Knight; Sacha Skarbek	Dodge	5:43
Total length:				54:23

Re-Release Bonus Tracks
No.	Title	Length
14.	"Made It Back 99" (Good Times Mix feat. Redman)	3:39
15.	"A.W.O.L." (Jus Bounce Mix)	4:07
16.	"Greatest Day" (Classic Mix)	4:15
Total length:		66:24

== Charts ==
Chart (1998)	Peak position
UK Albums (OCC)	42
UK R&B Albums (OCC)	6

== Certifications ==
Region	Certification	Certified units/sales
United Kingdom (BPI)	Gold	100,000^{^}
^{^} Shipments figures based on certification alone.
