= The Most Beautifullest Thing in This World (song) =

Single by Keith Murray

from the album The Most Beautifullest Thing in This World
- B-side: "Herb Is Pumpin'"
- Released: October 10, 1994
- Recorded: 1993
- Genre: Hip hop
- Length: 3:47
- Label: Jive
- Songwriters: Keith Murray; Erick Sermon; Chris Jasper; Ronald Isley; O'Kelly Isley; Rudolph Isley; Marvin Isley; Ernest Isley
- Producer: Erick Sermon

Keith Murray singles chronology
"The Most Beautifullest Thing in This World" (1994)	"Get Lifted" (1995)

Music video
- "The Most Beautifullest Thing in This World" on YouTube

Professional ratings
Review scores
Source	Rating
AllMusic	3/5 stars

"The Most Beautifullest Thing in This World" is a song by American rapper Keith Murray. It was released on October 10, 1994, through Jive Records as the lead single from Murray's debut studio album The Most Beautifullest Thing in This World. Written by Murray and Erick Sermon, it was produced by the latter, who also provided background vocals. The song utilizes samples of the 1983 hit record "Between the Sheets" originally performed by The Isley Brothers, "Bootsy Gets Live" by Bootsy Collins and "Slow Down" by Brand Nubian.

The song was Murray's most successful single to date, peaking at No. 50 on the Billboard Hot 100 and number three on the Hot Rap Singles chart.

The song was later sampled in Jay-Z's song "Glory".

== Track listing ==
No.	Title	Length
1.	"The Most Beautifullest Thing in This World" (LP version)
2.	"The Most Beautifullest Thing in This World (Green-Eyed remix)" (radio version)
3.	"The Most Beautifullest Thing in This World" (Sax remix)
4.	"Herb Is Pumpin'" (featuring Kiki Hitsville)

== Personnel ==
- Keith Omar Murray – vocals
- Erick Sermon – background vocals (tracks 1–3), producer, re-mixing (track 2)
- Sylvester Jordan – re-mixing (track 3)
- Kiki Hitsville – vocals (track 4)
- Tony Dawsey – mastering

== Chart performance ==
=== Weekly charts ===
Chart (1994)	Peak position
US Billboard Hot 100	50
US Hot R&B/Hip-Hop Songs (Billboard)	19
US Hot Rap Songs (Billboard)	3
US Maxi-Singles Sales (Billboard)	5

Chart (1995)	Peak position
UK Hip Hop/R&B (OCC) as "Get Lifted/Most Beautifullest Thing in This World"	21

=== Year-end charts ===
Chart (1995)	Position
US Hot R&B/Hip-Hop Songs (Billboard)	100
