= The Most Beautifullest Thing in This World =

Studio album by Keith Murray
- Released: November 8, 1994
- Recorded: November 1993 – August 1994
- Studios: Rockin' Reel; The Music Palace
- Genre: East Coast hip hop
- Length: 43:35
- Label: Jive
- Producers: Erick Sermon (also exec.); Busta Rhymes; Redman; Rod 'KP' Kirkpatrick

Keith Murray chronology
The Most Beautifullest Thing in This World (1994)	Enigma (1996)

Singles from The Most Beautifullest Thing in This World
- 1. "The Most Beautifullest Thing in This World" Released: October 10, 1994; 2. "Get Lifted" Released: January 27, 1995

The Most Beautifullest Thing in This World is the debut solo studio album by American rapper Keith Murray. It was released November 8, 1994, via Jive Records. The recording sessions took place at Rockin' Reel Studios in East Northport, New York and at The Music Palace in West Hempstead, New York. The album was produced by Erick Sermon, who also served as executive producer, Redman, Rod "KP" Kirkpatrick and Busta Rhymes. It features guest appearances from Erick Sermon, Redman, Hurricane Gee, Jamal and Paul Hightower.

The album peaked at number thirty-four on the US Billboard 200 chart and number five on the Top R&B/Hip-Hop Albums chart. It was certified gold in sales by the Recording Industry Association of America on August 4, 1995, after sales exceeding 500,000 copies in the United States.

== Critical reception ==
Professional ratings
Review scores
Source	Rating
AllMusic	4/5 stars
The Source	4/5 stars

Spin called Murray "an MC with raw energy" but noted that "often the tracks fall way behind Keith's bionic skill." Trouser Press wrote that "Murray keeps his clever rhymes moving, dropping culture references and his 'sychosymatic' lingo."

== Track listing ==
No.	Title	Writer(s)	Producer(s)	Length
1.	"Live from New York"	Erick Sermon	Erick Sermon	1:20
2.	"Sychosymatic"	Keith Murray; Sermon; Beresford Romeo; Simon Law; Caron Wheeler	Sermon	2:57
3.	"Dip Dip Di"	Murray; Sermon; Rod Kirkpatrick	Sermon; Rod 'KP' Kirkpatrick	3:14
4.	"The Most Beautifullest Thing in This World"	Murray; Sermon; Chris Jasper; Ernie Isley; Marvin Isley; Rudolph Bernard Isley; O'Kelly Isley; Ronald Isley; William Collins; George Clinton, Jr.; M. Parker	Sermon	3:47
5.	"Herb Is Pumpin'"	Murray; Sermon	Sermon	2:28
6.	"Sychoward"	Sermon	Sermon	0:37
7.	"Straight Loonie" (featuring Jamal and Erick Sermon)	Murray; Jamal Phillips; Sermon; Kirkpatrick; Trevor Smith	Sermon; Kirkpatrick; Busta Rhymes	3:20
8.	"Danger"	Murray; Sermon; Roger Troutman; Larry Troutman	Sermon	3:35
9.	"Get Lifted"	Murray; Sermon; Harry Wayne Casey; Richard Finch	Sermon	4:02
10.	"How's That" (featuring Erick Sermon and Redman)	Murray; Sermon; Reginald Noble	Sermon	3:05
11.	"The Chase"	Sermon	Sermon	0:45
12.	"Take It to the Streetz" (featuring Ron Jay and 50 Grand)	Murray; R. Joseph; Gerald Berlin; Sermon	Sermon	3:56
13.	"Bom Bom Zee" (featuring Paul Hightower and Hurricane G.)	Murray; Gloria Rodríguez; Sermon; Barrett Strong; Norman Whitfield	Sermon	2:16
14.	"Countdown"	Sermon	Sermon	0:23
15.	"Escapism"	Murray; Noble; Bruce Napier; Andrew Noland; Greg Webster; Walter Morrison; Marvin Pierce; Marshall Jones; Ralph Middlebrooks; Leroy Bonner	Redman	4:02
16.	"The Most Beautifullest Thing in This World (Green-Eyed Remix)"	Murray; Sermon; Collins; Clinton, Jr.; Parker	Sermon	3:48
Total length:				43:35

== Personnel ==
- Keith Murray – main artist
- Erick Sermon – featured artist (tracks 7, 10), producer (tracks 1–14, 16), executive producer, re-mixing (track 16)
- Jamal Phillips – featured artist (track 7)
- Reginald "Redman" Noble – featured artist (track 10), producer (track 15)
- Gloria "Hurricane G" Rodríguez – featured artist (track 13)
- Paul Hightower – featured artist (track 13)
- Rod 'KP' Kirkpatrick – producer (tracks 3, 7)
- Trevor "Busta Rhymes" Smith Jr. – producer (track 7)
- Bob Fudjinski – recording (tracks 1–7, 10–16), mixing (tracks 1–7, 9–16)
- Dave Greenberg – recording (tracks 4, 8, 9, 16), mixing (track 8)
- Tony Dawsey – mastering
- Daniel Hastings – design, photography
- Cartel – design, photography

== Charts ==
=== Weekly charts ===
Chart (1994)	Peak position
US Billboard 200	34
US Top R&B/Hip-Hop Albums (Billboard)	5

=== Year-end charts ===
Chart (1995)	Position
US Top R&B/Hip-Hop Albums (Billboard)	50

== Certifications ==
Region	Certification	Certified units/sales
United States (RIAA)	Gold	500,000^{^}
^{^} Shipments figures based on certification alone.
