= Yeah Yeah U Know It =

Single by Def Squad

from the album He's Keith Murray
- Released: January 28, 2003
- Recorded: 2002
- Studio: Mirror Image (New York, NY)
- Genre: Hip hop
- Length: 4:12
- Label: Def Jam
- Songwriters: Keith Murray; Erick Sermon; Reginald Noble; Justin Smith
- Producer: Just Blaze

Keith Murray singles chronology
"Fatty Girl" (2001)	"Yeah Yeah U Know It" (2003)	"Candi Bar" (2003)

Redman singles chronology
"Ride" (2003)	"Yeah Yeah U Know It" (2003)	"Put It Down" (2007)

Erick Sermon singles chronology
"Love Iz" (2002)	"Yeah Yeah U Know It" (2003)	"Relentless/I'm Not Him" (2004)

Music video
- "Yeah Yeah U Know It" on YouTube

"Yeah Yeah U Know It" is a song written and performed by American hip hop group Def Squad. It was released on January 28, 2003 through Def Jam Recordings as the lead single from Keith Murray's fourth solo studio album He's Keith Murray. Production was handled by Just Blaze. The song peaked at number 99 on the Billboard Hot 100 and number 50 on the Hot R&B/Hip-Hop Songs in the United States.

"Yeah Yeah U Know It" has been described by Murray as an "old-school hip-hop song".

== Track listing ==
12" vinyl
No.	Title	Length
1.	"Yeah Yeah U Know It" (Radio)
2.	"Yeah Yeah U Know It" (LP Version)
3.	"Yeah Yeah U Know It" (Instrumental)
4.	"Yeah Yeah U Know It" (Acapella)

CD Maxi-single
No.	Title	Writer(s)	Producer(s)	Length
1.	"Yeah Yeah U Know It" (featuring Def Squad)	Keith Murray; Erick Sermon; Reginald Noble; Justin Smith	Just Blaze	4:12
2.	"Fatty Girl" (featuring Ludacris and LL Cool J)	Murray; Christopher Bridges; James Todd Smith; Jean-Claude Olivier; Samuel Barnes; Pharrell Williams	Poke & Tone	3:55
3.	"Special Delivery (Remix)" (featuring Ghostface Killah, G. Dep and Craig Mack)	Murray; Dennis Coles; Trevell Coleman; Craig Mack; Harve Pierre; Lamont Porter	EZ Elpee	4:39
Total length:				12:46

== Charts ==
Chart (2003)	Peak position
US Billboard Hot 100	99
US Hot R&B/Hip-Hop Songs (Billboard)	50
US R&B/Hip-Hop Airplay (Billboard)	51
US Hot R&B/Hip-Hop Singles Sales (Billboard)	11
