= El Niño (Def Squad album) =

Studio album by Def Squad
- Released: June 30, 1998
- Recorded: 1997–1998
- Studio: Mirror Image Recordings (Dix Hills, New York)
- Genre: Hip-hop
- Length: 50:42
- Label: Def Squad; Jive; Def Jam
- Producer: Erick Sermon (also exec.); Reggie Noble (also exec.)

Erick Sermon chronology
Insomnia (1996)	El Niño (1998)	Erick Onasis (2000)

Redman chronology
Muddy Waters (1996)	El Niño (1998)	Doc's da Name 2000 (1998)

Keith Murray chronology
Enigma (1996)	El Niño (1998)	It's a Beautiful Thing (1999)

Singles from El Niño
- 1. "Full Cooperation" Released: April 14, 1998

El Niño is the only studio album by American hip-hop group Def Squad, composed of rappers Redman, Erick Sermon and Keith Murray. It was released on June 30, 1998, via Def Squad Records, Def Jam Recordings and Jive Records. The recording sessions took place at Mirror Image Recordings in Dix Hills, New York. The album was produced by Erick Sermon and Redman. It features guest appearances from Biz Markie, Mally G, Too $hort, and the Drama Squad.

The album reached number two on the Billboard 200 and number-one spot on the Top R&B/Hip-Hop Albums in the United States. It was certified Gold by the Recording Industry Association of America on July 29, 1998. Its lead single, "Full Cooperation", peaked at No. 51 on the Hot R&B/Hip-Hop Songs, at No. 11 on the Hot Canadian Digital Song Sales, at No. 63 on the R&B/Hip-Hop Airplay. The song "Countdown" was released as promotional single. The song "Ride Wit Us" later appeared on Keith Murray's third album It's a Beautiful Thing.

== Critical reception ==
Professional ratings
Review scores
Source	Rating
AllMusic	3/5 stars
Robert Christgau	(choice cut)
Los Angeles Times	3/4 stars
Muzik	3/5 stars
The Source	4/5 stars

The Village Voice praised Sermon's production, but noted that it's not enough "to mask the taste of violent skits, scandalous bitches, unrepentant baby fathers, automatic weapons, and other unhealthy canned stuff."

== Track listing ==
No.	Title	Writer(s)	Producer(s)	Length
1.	"Shower" (Intro)	R. Noble	Redman	1:38
2.	"Check N' Me Out"	R. Noble; E. Sermon; K. Murray; N. Whitfield	Erick Sermon	3:54
3.	"Countdown" (featuring Jamal)	R. Noble; E. Sermon; K. Murray; J. Phillips; C. Siffre	Erick Sermon	3:57
4.	"Full Cooperation"	R. Noble; E. Sermon; K. Murray; H. Ousley	Erick Sermon	3:48
5.	"Ride wit Us" (featuring Too $hort)	R. Noble; E. Sermon; K. Murray; T. Shaw	Erick Sermon	3:38
6.	"Lay 'Em Down" (Skit)	R. Noble	Redman	1:06
7.	"Rhymin' wit' Biz" (featuring Biz Markie)	R. Noble; E. Sermon; K. Murray; A. Hardy; M. Williams	Erick Sermon	3:42
8.	"The Game" (Freestyle)	R. Noble; E. Sermon; K. Murray; K. Walker; J. Moore	Erick Sermon	2:40
9.	"World Announcement" (Skit)	R. Noble	Redman	1:28
10.	"Can U Dig It?"	R. Noble; E. Sermon; K. Murray; W. Squier	Erick Sermon	3:16
11.	"You Do, I Do"	R. Noble; E. Sermon; K. Murray	Redman	4:07
12.	"Y'all Niggas Ain't Ready"	R. Noble; E. Sermon; K. Murray	Erick Sermon	2:43
13.	"Say Word!"	R. Noble; E. Sermon; K. Murray; M. Ragin	Erick Sermon	3:38
14.	"No Guest List"	R. Noble; E. Sermon; K. Murray; E. Barrier; W. Griffin	Erick Sermon	3:27
15.	"Babies Father Committee" (Skit)	R. Noble	Redman	0:55
16.	"Def Squad Delite"	R. Noble; E. Sermon; K. Murray; N. Rodgers	Erick Sermon	6:45
Total length:				50:42

== Personnel ==
- Erick Sermon – vocals, producer (tracks: 2–5, 7–8, 10, 12–14, 16), executive producer
- Reginald Noble – vocals, producer (tracks: 1, 6, 9, 11, 15), executive producer
- Keith Murray – vocals, executive producer
- Jamal C. Phillips – vocals (track 3)
- Todd Anthony Shaw – vocals (track 5)
- Marcel Theo Hall – vocals (track 7)
- Nasty Nadj – vocals (tracks: 1, 6, 9, 15)
- TE TE – vocals (tracks: 1, 6, 9, 15)
- Dave Rockin' Reel – vocals (tracks: 1, 6, 9, 15)
- Moe Green – vocals (tracks: 1, 6, 9, 15)
- Miguel – vocals (tracks: 1, 6, 9, 15)
- Nikki D. – vocals (tracks: 1, 6, 9, 15)
- Kevin Liles – A&R, co-executive producer
- Bernard Alexander – co-executive producer
- Tony Dawsey – mastering
- Chris Tricarico – coordinator
- Wayne Van Acker – artwork
- Jonathan Mannion – photography
- The Drawing Board – art direction, design

== Charts ==
=== Weekly charts ===
Chart (1998)	Peak position
US Billboard 200	2
US Top R&B/Hip-Hop Albums (Billboard)	1

=== Year-end charts ===
Chart (1998)	Position
US Billboard 200	186
US Top R&B/Hip-Hop Albums (Billboard)	58

== Certifications ==
Region	Certification	Certified units/sales
United States (RIAA)	Gold	500,000^{^}
^{^} Shipments figures based on certification alone.

== See also ==
- List of Billboard number-one R&B albums of 1998
