= He's Keith Murray =

Studio album by Keith Murray
- Released: April 29, 2003
- Recorded: 2002–2003
- Studio: Fox Hole; Mirror Image (Dix Hills, New York); The Music Grinder (Los Angeles); L.I.T.E. (Long Island); Patchwerk (Atlanta); Bearsville (Bearsville, New York)
- Genre: East Coast hip hop
- Length: 51:25
- Label: Def Squad; L.O.D.; Def Jam
- Producer: DJ Clark Kent; DJ Khalil; Erick Sermon; Jamie Foxx; Jazze Pha; Just Blaze; Keith Murray; Omen; Qur'an Goodman; Ruggedness; Trackmasters; Pete Rock

Keith Murray chronology
The Most Beautifullest Hits (1999)	He's Keith Murray (2003)	Rap-Murr-Phobia (The Fear of Real Hip-Hop) (2007)

Singles from He's Keith Murray
- 1. "Yeah Yeah U Know It" Released: January 28, 2003

Professional ratings
Review scores
Source	Rating
AllHipHop	3.5/5 stars
AllMusic	2.5/5 stars
HipHopDX	3/5
RapReviews	7.5/10
Vibe	3/5 marks

He's Keith Murray is the fourth solo studio album by American rapper Keith Murray. It was released on April 29, 2003, through Erick Sermon's Def Squad Records and Def Jam Recordings, making it his only studio album for the latter label. The recording sessions took place at Fox Hole Studios, Mirror Image in New York City, The Music Grinder in Los Angeles, L.I.T.E. Studios in Long Island, Patchwerk Studios in Atlanta, and Bearsville Sound Studios in Bearsville, New York. The album was produced by Erick Sermon, Jamie Foxx, DJ Clark Kent, DJ Khalil, Jazze Pha, Just Blaze, Keith Murray, Omen, Poke and Tone, Qur'an Goodman, Ruggedness, and Pete Rock. It features guest appearances from Def Squad, Jamie Foxx, Busta Rhymes, Joe Hooker, and Kel-Vicious.

The album peaked at number 40 on the Billboard 200 and number 11 on the Top R&B/Hip-Hop Albums in the United States. Its lead single "Yeah Yeah U Know It" made it to number 99 on the Billboard Hot 100 and number 50 on the Hot R&B/Hip-Hop Songs.

== Track listing ==
No.	Title	Writer(s)	Producer(s)	Length
1.	"Da Intro (Skit)" (featuring Jamie Foxx)	Eric Marlon Bishop	Jamie Foxx	0:15
2.	"The Carnage" (featuring Joe Hooker)	Keith Murray; Harve Pierre; Melvin Carter	Ruggedness	4:14
3.	"Oh My Goodness"	Murray; Qur'an Goodman	Qur'an Goodman	4:26
4.	"Yeah Yeah U Know It" (featuring Def Squad)	Murray; Reginald Noble; Erick Sermon; Justin Smith	Just Blaze	4:10
5.	"Star (Skit)" (featuring Jamie Foxx)	Bishop	Jamie Foxx	0:38
6.	"Candi Bar"	Murray; Khalil Abdul-Rahman; Patti Austin	DJ Khalil	3:45
7.	"Christina"	Murray; Rodolfo Franklin; Dino Fekaris; Nick Zesses; G. Alexander; J. Baker	DJ Clark Kent	4:24
8.	"Sucka Free (Skit)" (featuring Jamie Foxx)	Bishop	Jamie Foxx	0:48
9.	"Sucka Free"	Murray; Sermon	Erick Sermon	4:01
10.	"Say Whaatt" (featuring Redman)	Murray; Noble; Phalon Alexander	Jazze Pha	4:00
11.	"Da Ba Dunk Song"	Murray; Jean-Claude Olivier; Samuel Barnes	Poke & Tone	3:00
12.	"B.C. (Skit)" (featuring Jamie Foxx)	Bishop	Jamie Foxx	0:52
13.	"Swagger Back"	Murray; Sidney Brown; T. Rivelli	Omen	3:16
14.	"On Smash" (featuring Busta Rhymes and Kel-Vicious)	Murray; Trevor Smith; Kelly J. Brister; Sermon	Erick Sermon	4:24
15.	"Say Goodnite (Skit)"	Murray; M. Brown	Keith Murray	0:58
16.	"Say Goodnite"	Murray; Sermon; Peter Phillips; Tracy Curry; Leon Sylvers; Ricky Walters; Douglas Davis	Erick Sermon; Pete Rock (co.)	4:15
17.	"Child of the Streets (Man Child)"	Murray; Sermon; Sam Dees; David Camon	Erick Sermon; Keith Murray (co.)	3:59
Total length:				51:25

Sample credits

- Track 6 contains an interpolation from the composition "Havana Candy" written by Patrica Austin
- Track 7 contains a sample from "Mother Nature" by the Temptations
- Track 16 contains samples from "It's Funky Enough" by the D.O.C. and samples from "The Show" by Doug E. Fresh
- Track 17 contains an interpolation of "Child of the Streets" written by Sam Dees and David Camon

== Charts ==
Chart (2003)	Peak position
French Albums (SNEP)	107
UK R&B Albums (OCC)	34
US Billboard 200	40
US Top R&B/Hip-Hop Albums (Billboard)	11
