= No Pressure (Erick Sermon album) =

Studio album by Erick Sermon
- Released: October 19, 1993
- Recorded: 1992–1993
- Genre: Hip hop
- Length: 54:23
- Labels: Rush Associated Labels; Chaos; Def Jam
- Producers: Erick Sermon; Brent Tucker; Colin Wolfe

Erick Sermon chronology
No Pressure (1993)	Double or Nothing (1995)

Singles from No Pressure
- 1. "Hittin' Switches" Released: May 4, 1993; 2. "Stay Real" Released: September 7, 1993

No Pressure is the debut solo studio album by the American rapper and record producer Erick Sermon. It was released on October 19, 1993, via Def Jam Recordings. The album was produced mainly by Sermon, who also served as executive producer. It features guest appearances from Ice Cube, Joe Sinistr, Kam, Keith Murray, Redman, and Shadz of Lingo. The album made it to No. 16 on the Billboard 200 chart and No. 2 on the Top R&B/Hip-Hop Albums chart in the United States.

The album spawned two singles: "Hittin' Switches" and "Stay Real".

== Critical reception ==
Professional ratings
Review scores
Source	Rating
AllMusic	4/5 stars
Entertainment Weekly	A−
RapReviews	7.5/10
The Source	4/5 stars

The Baltimore Sun wrote that "as much as Sermon maintains the old flavor, these jams never quite come across as deja-funk; not only are the loops heavier than they used to be, but there's a layer of dissonance in there that pushes these tracks away from the usual bass-driven grooves and toward something harder and funkier."

== Track listing ==
No.	Title	Writer(s)	Producer(s)	Length
1.	"Intro"			0:34
2.	"Payback II" (featuring Joe Sinistr)	Erick Sermon	Erick Sermon	3:58
3.	"Stay Real"	Sermon; Roger Troutman; Larry Troutman	Erick Sermon	3:55
4.	"Imma Gitz Mine"	Sermon	Erick Sermon	3:31
5.	"Hostile" (featuring Keith Murray)	Sermon	Erick Sermon	3:38
6.	"Do It Up"	Sermon	Erick Sermon	4:00
7.	"Safe Sex"	Sermon; James Brown; Fred Wesley; John Starks; R. Troutman; L. Troutman	Erick Sermon	3:43
8.	"Hittin' Switches"	Sermon	Erick Sermon	3:55
9.	"Intro"			0:10
10.	"Erick Sermon"	Sermon; Dwight Myers; Marcel Hall; Marlon Williams	Erick Sermon	3:18
11.	"The Hype"	Sermon; Teena Marie Brockert; Allen McGrier	Erick Sermon	4:04
12.	"Lil Crazy" (featuring Shadz of Lingo)	Sermon	Erick Sermon	4:23
13.	"The Ill Shit" (featuring Kam & Ice Cube)	Sermon; R. Troutman; L. Troutman	Erick Sermon	3:25
14.	"Swing It Over Here" (featuring Redman & Keith Murray)	Sermon	Erick Sermon	2:53
15.	"Interview"	Sermon	Erick Sermon	1:24
16.	"All in the Mind" (featuring Soup)	Sermon	Erick Sermon; Colin Wolfe (co.)	3:37
17.	"Female Species" (Bonus Track)	Sermon	Brent Tucker; Erick Sermon (co.)	3:55
Total length:				54:23

Sample credits

- "Stay Real" and "Safe Sex" contain samples from "Dance Floor" by Zapp, written by Roger Troutman and Larry Troutman.
- "Safe Sex" contains elements from "The Payback" by James Brown, written by Brown, Fred Wesley, and John Starks.
- "Erick Sermon" contains elements from "We Write the Songs" by Biz Markie & Heavy D, written by Dwight Myers, Marcel Hall, and Marlon Williams.
- "The Hype" contains samples from "Square Biz" by Teena Marie, written by Teena Marie Brockert and Allen McGrier.
- "The Ill Shit" contains samples from "I Can Make You Dance" by Zapp, written by Roger Troutman and Larry Troutman.

== Personnel ==
- Erick Sermon – main artist, producer (tracks: 2–8, 10–16), co-producer (track 17), executive producer
- Joe Sinistr – featured artist (track 2)
- Jeffrey Stewart – featured artist & arranger (track 5)
- Keith Omar Murray – featured artist (tracks: 5, 14)
- Shadz of Lingo – featured artist (track 12)
- Craig A. Miller – featured artist (track 13)
- O'Shea Jackson Sr. – featured artist (track 13)
- Reginald Noble – featured artist (track 14)
- Debra Killings – vocals (track 7)
- Derrick Culbreath – vocals (track 11)
- Michael J. Morgan "Soup" – vocals (track 16)
- Brent Tucker – producer (track 17)
- Colin Wolfe – co-producer (track 16)
- Robert David Greenberg – engineering (tracks: 2, 5, 14, 15)
- George "Catfish" Pappas – engineering (tracks: 3, 4, 6, 16), mixing (tracks: 7, 10)
- Darin Prindle – engineering (tracks: 7, 8, 10–12, 17)
- Tony Dawsey – mastering
- Danny Clinch – photography

== Charts ==
Chart (1993)	Peak position
US Billboard 200	16
US Top R&B/Hip-Hop Albums (Billboard)	2
