= Jamal (rapper) =

American rapper (born 1979)

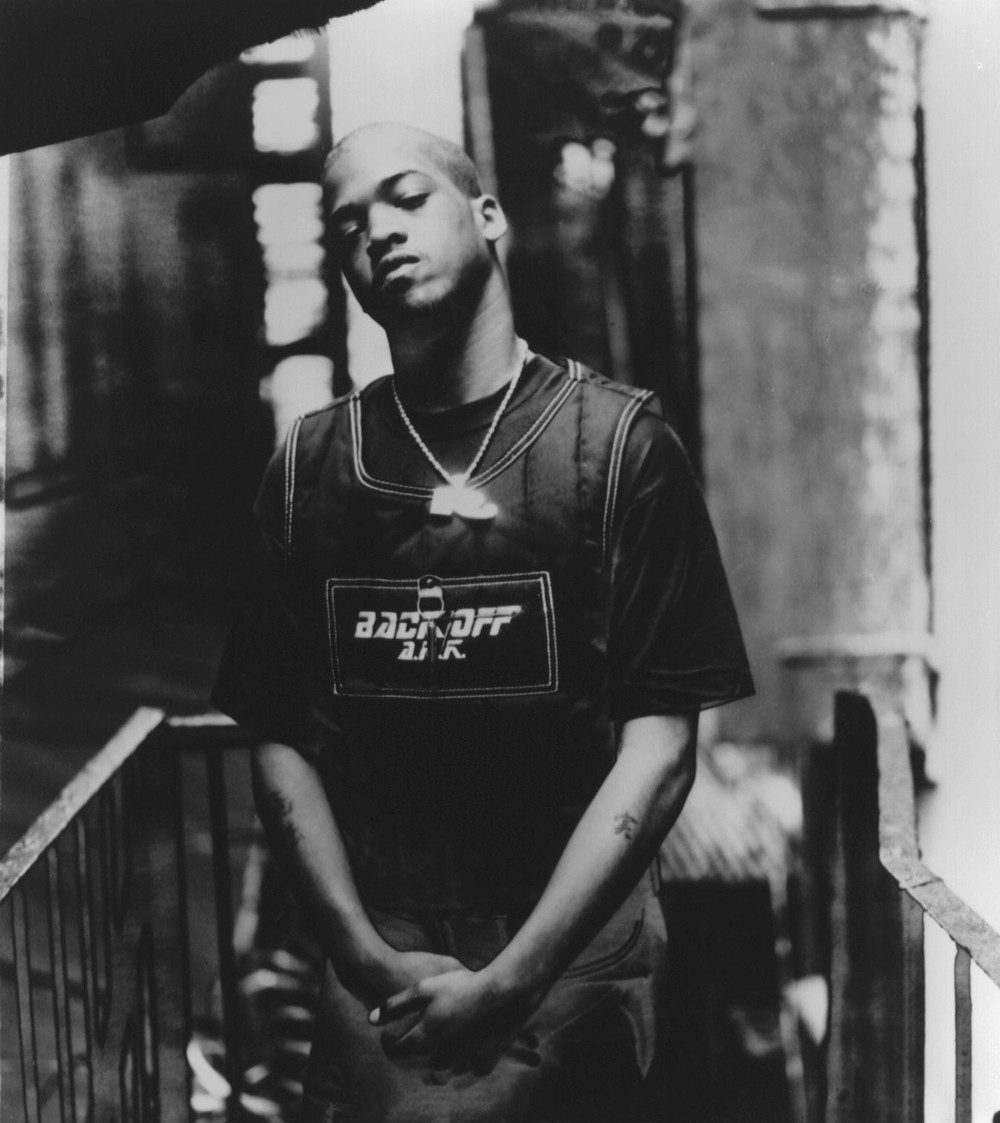

Background information
- Also known as: Mally G
- Born: Jamal Phillips; April 26, 1979 (age 47)
- Origin: Philadelphia, Pennsylvania, U.S.
- Genres: Hip hop
- Occupations: Rapper; record producer
- Years active: 1992–present
- Labels: Rowdy; Smoke-a-Lot
- Formerly of: Illegal

Jamal Phillips (born April 26, 1979), known professionally mononymously as Jamal and formerly as Mally G, is an American rapper and record producer. He started his career as one-half of rap duo Illegal, the rap act formed by Dallas Austin in the early 1990s. He is a current member of Def Squad.

== Discography ==
=== Studio albums ===
List of studio albums, with selected chart positions
Title	Album details	Peak chart positions	
Title	Album details	US	US R&B
Last Chance, No Breaks	Released: October 10, 1995; Label: Rowdy; Formats: CD, LP, cassette	198	37

=== Collaborative albums ===
List of collaborative studio albums, with selected chart positions
Title	Album details	Peak chart positions	
Title	Album details	US	US R&B
The Untold Truth (as part of Illegal)	Released: August 24, 1993; Label: Rowdy; Formats: CD, LP, cassette	119	19

=== Singles ===
Title	Release	Peak chart positions		Album
Title	Release	US R&B	US Rap	Album
"Fades Em All"	1995	59	9	Last Chance, No Breaks
"Keep It Real"	1996	76	17	Last Chance, No Breaks

=== Assorted Features ===
Year	Title	Album	Artist
1994	Straight Loonie	The Most Beautifulest Thing in This World...	Keith Murray
1995	The Points	Panther (soundtrack)	Various
1995	Thangs Change	Cocktails	Too Short, Illegal, Baby D
1995	Realm of Junior M.A.F.I.A	Conspriracy	Junior Mafia
1996	Flipmode Squad Meets Def Squad	The Coming	Busta Rhymes, Keith Murray, Rampage, Redman, Lord Have Mercy
1996	"Cleverness	To da Beat Y'all	MC Breed, Passion, Chuck Nyce
1996	Beez Like That (Sometimes)	Erick Sermon Presets Insomnia	Calif
1996	Yeah	Enigma	Keith Murray, Def Squad, Busta Rhymes
1996	Da Ill Out	Muddy Waters	Redman
1997	There's Not a Problem My Squad Can't Fix	When Disaster Strikes	Busta Rhymes
1998	Countdown	El Nino	Def Squad
1998	I Ain't Gonna Forget This	Nationwide: Independence Day	Badwayz
