= Tony Dawsey =

Mastering engineer

Tony Dawsey is an American mastering engineer at Masterdisk in New York City. He has been active since 1980.

His credits include artists such as Jay-Z, Akon, Whitney Houston, DMX, Kid Rock, Gang Starr, Redman, Ghostface Killah, Moby, Nine Inch Nails, J. (Jaye Muller), Ronny Jordan, and King's X.

Dawsey grew up in Spanish Harlem in New York City. He got a job at Masterdisk in the mail room and making cassettes in 1980. While at Masterdisk, he learned to be a mastering engineer and has since been an extremely notable mastering engineer in the industry, particularly well known for his work with Hip-Hop. He mastered his first #1, multi-platinum album in 1987, which was the soundtrack to the film La Bamba.
