= Def Squad =

American hip hop group

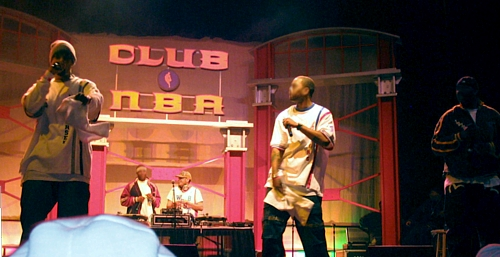
- Def Squad members Redman (left) and Erick Sermon performing at the 2004 NBA All-Star Jam Session in Los Angeles

Background information
- Origin: Long Island, New York, U.S.
- Genre: Hip hop
- Years active: 1993–present
- Labels: Def Jam; DreamWorks; Universal Motown Republic Group
- Spinoffs: Method Man & Redman
- Spinoff of: Hit Squad
- Members: Keith Murray; Redman; Erick Sermon; Jamal
- Past members: Hurricane G (deceased)

Def Squad is an American rap supergroup consisting of Erick Sermon, Redman, Keith Murray, Hurricane G, and Jamal. Before officially forming as a group to release an album in 1998, they had each been featured on tracks by each other. The Def Squad was formed following the disbandment of the Hit Squad, who broke up after the struggles between EPMD members Erick Sermon and Parrish Smith.

They are known for their remake of "Rapper's Delight" by Sugarhill Gang.

The Squad continued to record on each other's solo albums.

== Discography ==
Album information
El Niño
- Released: June 30, 1998
- Billboard 200 chart position: #2
- R&B/Hip-Hop chart position: #1
- Last RIAA Certification: Gold
- Singles: "Full Cooperation"
