= 3 Joints =

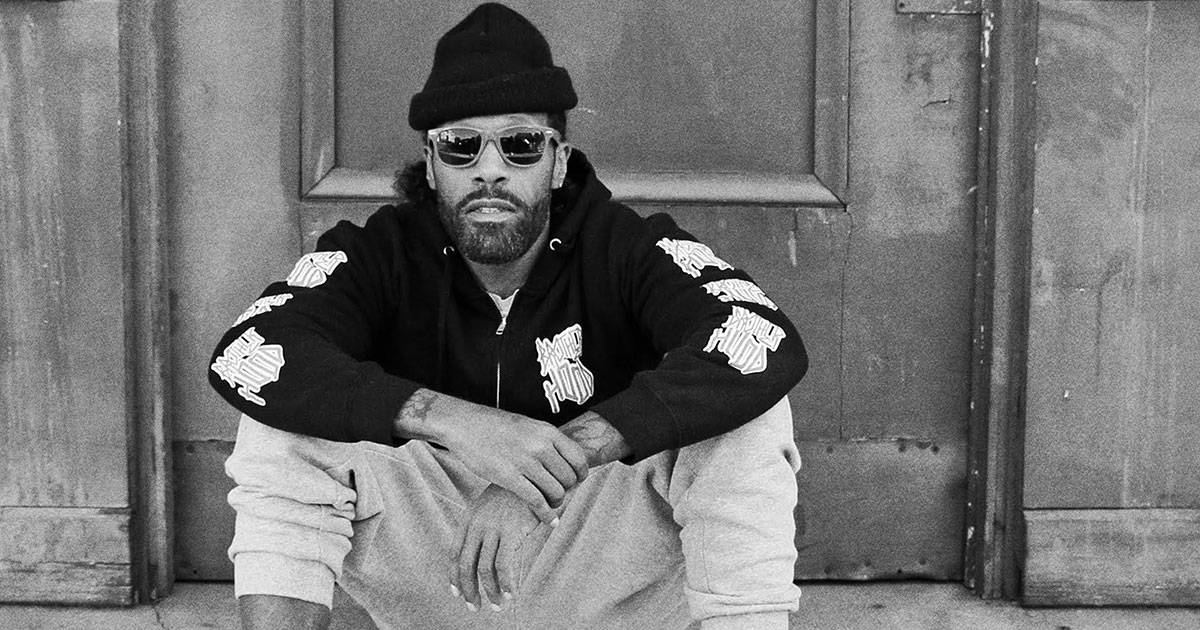

EP by Redman
- Released: January 10, 2020
- Genre: Hip hop
- Label: Gilla House, Riveting Music
- Producer: Redman

Redman chronology
Mudface (2015)	3 Joints (2020)	Muddy Waters Too (2024)

3 Joints is a three-track extended play (EP) by American rapper Redman, released on January 10, 2020, through Riveting Music and Gilla House. The EP serves as a precursor to his long-awaited album Muddy Waters Too, providing fans with a brief but energetic collection of tracks after a five-year gap since his previous project, Mudface (2015).

== Background ==
Following the release of Mudface, Redman took a hiatus from solo projects. In early 2020, he released 3 Joints without prior promotion. The EP's title refers to its structure: three full-length tracks intended to remind fans of his lyrical agility and trademark humor.

== Critical reception ==
3 Joints received generally favorable reviews. HipHopDX described the EP as a "solid contact high," noting that while it didn't reinvent Redman's style, it effectively delivered the gritty, humorous tone fans expect. In contrast, RapReviews called the EP a "tease," suggesting it may have been a way to capitalize on the success of the single "Slap Da Shit Outcha" without delivering a full-length album.

== Track listing ==
1. "It's a Banguh"
2. "Slap Da Shit Outcha"
3. "Zugga"

== Personnel ==
- Redman – vocals, executive producer
- Josh Gannet – mixing and mastering engineer
