= Ulla Jones =

Swedish model, actress, artist, and entertainer (born 1946)

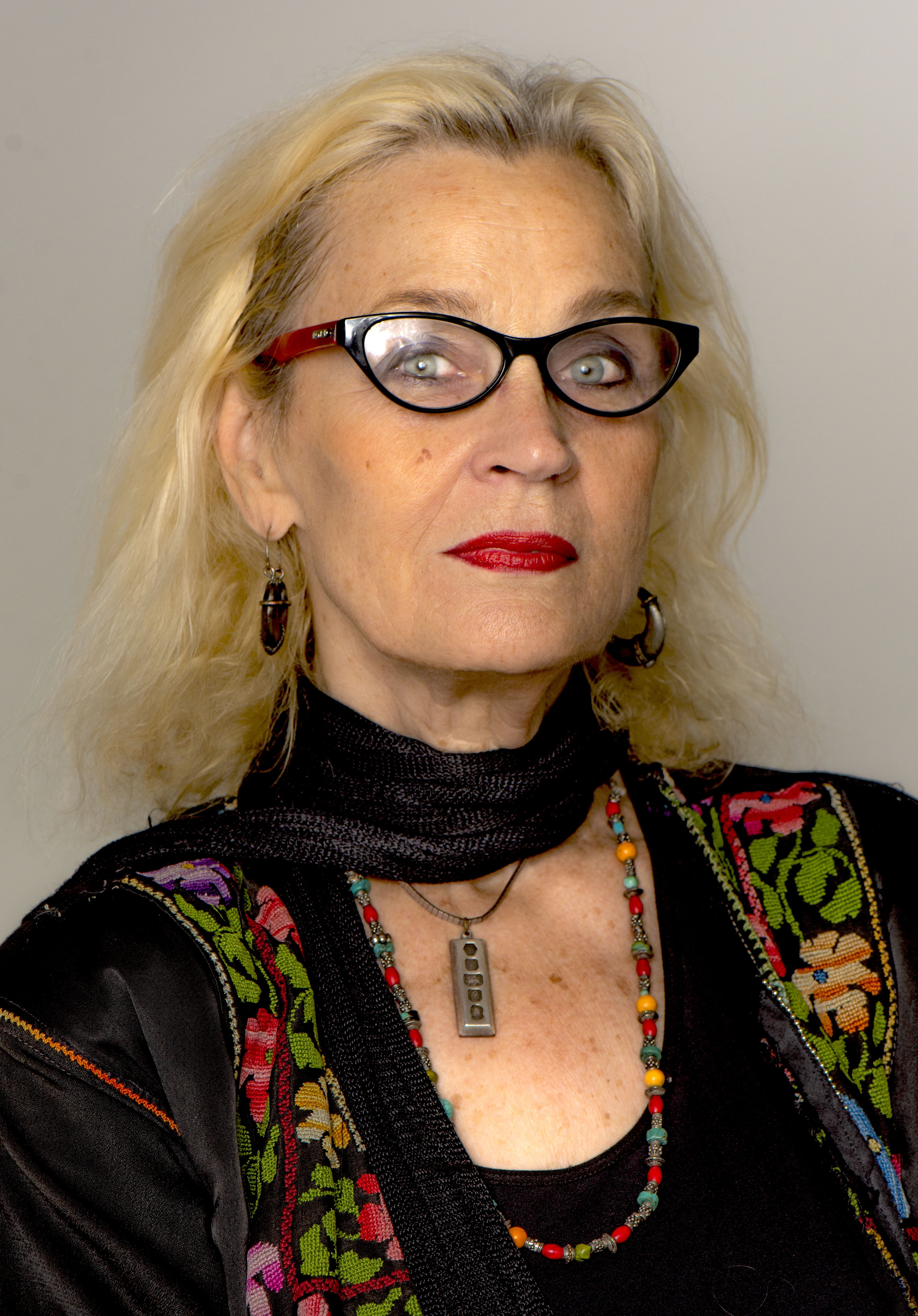
- Ulla Andersson in 2018
- Born: Ulla Agneta Andersson; 18 June 1946 (age 80); Stockholm, Sweden
- Occupations: Model, actress, singer-songwriter, author, artist, makeup artist, photographer
- Agent: Ford Models
- Known for: Modeling
- Spouse: Quincy Jones (m. 1967; div. 1974)
- Children: 2, including Quincy III

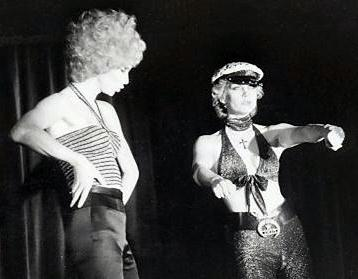
Jones (right) and Christer Lindarw at their stage debut in 1976

Ulla Agneta Jones (née Andersson; born 18 June 1946) is a Swedish actress, singer-songwriter, photographer, and retired model. From 1967 to 1974, she was married to music producer Quincy Jones and is the mother of Quincy Jones III.

== Career ==
=== Model and acting ===
Andersson was a highly sought-after fashion model, who also acted in small roles in Hollywood films. She appeared on numerous magazine covers during the 1960s, before she retired from the Ford Modeling Agency.

In January 1976, after moving back to Sweden, Ulla Jones was cast in a Stockholm production of Wild Side Story, with her performance being singled out for notice in major press.

=== Singer/Songwriter ===
In January 1979, Jones began recording her debut album. Jones worked with a handful of musicians including producers Björn J:son Lindh and Lars Samuelson. She released her debut album No Time No Space No Age No Race That's Nifty! with twelve tracks, all but one written by her, in a mixture of various musical genres including pop, folk, country, and world.

The album remains her only record to date, although she has written songs recorded by other singers, and released the single "Dirty Angels" in 1984.

== Personal life ==
Andersson was married to American music producer Quincy Jones, with whom she had two children, one of whom is Quincy Jones III. After seven years together, the couple formally separated in March 1972 and Jones returned to Sweden with their children. The pair divorced in 1974, and Quincy Jones promptly married actress Peggy Lipton.

In 2001, Andersson released an autobiography called Red Carpet Blues: Inside of an Outsider.

In her book, Jones called herself Ulla Andesong (Swedish for "spirit song").

== Filmography ==
Year	Title	Role	Notes
1963	To Bed or Not to Bed	—N/a	
1973	Luftburen	Mrs. Stroll	
1987	"The King of Kungsan”	–	Served as makeup artist

== Stage ==
Year	Title	Role
January 1976	Wild Side Story	Betty-Sue

== Discography ==
=== Studio albums ===
Title	Details
No Time No Space No Age No Race That's Nifty!	Release date: 1979; Label: Four Leaf Clover Records; Formats: Digital download

=== Singles ===
Year	Title	Album
1984	"Dirty Angeles/Some People Like Blood"	Non-album single

=== Writing and arrangement ===
Year	Title	Artist	Album	Notes
1980	"Ditt Horn Är Min Passion (I Love a Rainy Night)"	Maritza Horn	Celluloid	Songwriter, additional vocals
1980	"Tänk Om..."	Maritza Horn	Celluloid	Songwriter, additional vocals
1980	"Mörkblå Är Natten"	Maritza Horn	Celluloid	Songwriter, additional vocals
1980	"Med Vind Under Vingen (Life Is A Process)"	Maritza Horn	Celluloid	Songwriter, additional vocals
1985	"May The Whisper"	Greta & Malou	Greta & Malou	Co-writer

== Bibliography ==
- Andersson, Ulla. Red Carpet Blues.
- Jones, Quincy. Q: The Autobiography of Quincy Jones, 2001.
