= Pick It Up (Redman song) =

Single by Redman

from the album Muddy Waters
- B-side: "Yesh Yesh Y'all"
- Released: May 13, 1997
- Genre: Hip hop; East Coast hip hop
- Length: 3:59
- Label: Def Jam
- Songwriters: Reggie Noble; Erick Sermon
- Producer: Erick Sermon

Redman singles chronology
"Whateva Man" (1997)	"Pick It Up" (1997)	"Lose My Cool" (1997)

Music video
- "Pick It Up" on YouTube

"Pick It Up" is a song by American rapper Redman recorded for his third album Muddy Waters (1996). The song was released as the third and final single for the album on May 13, 1997.

== Track listing ==
12" vinyl

1. "Pick It Up" (radio) – 3:55
2. "Pick It Up" (LP version) – 3:59
3. "Pick It Up" (instrumental) – 3:59
4. "Yesh Yesh Y'all" (radio) – 3:55
5. "Yesh Yesh Y'all" (instrumental) – 3:59

== Charts ==
Chart (1997)	Peak position
US Hot R&B/Hip-Hop Songs (Billboard)	69
US Hot Rap Songs (Billboard)	32
US Dance Club Songs (Billboard)	10
