= Wild Side Story =

Parody musical

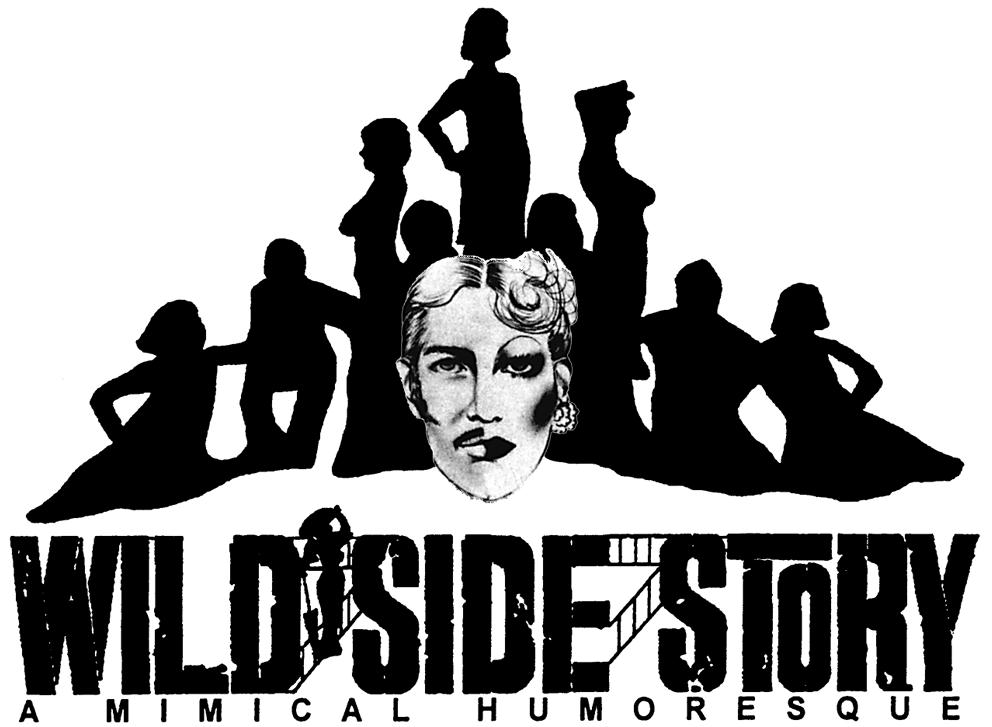
- 2001 logo with silhouette from 1973 and drawing by Christer Lindarw from 1976

Wild Side Story is a parody musical that originated in 1973 as a drag show on the gay scene of Miami Beach, soon developed there into an underground happening for mixed audiences, and up until 2004 was performed hundreds of times in Florida, Sweden, California and Spain.

== Background ==
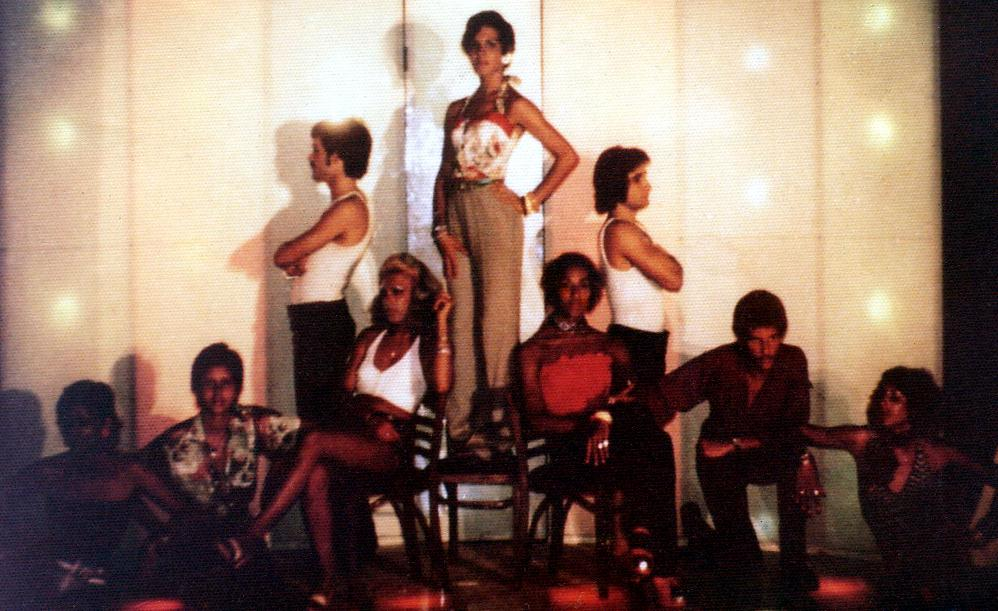
The first Wild Side Story cast at Ambassadors III 1973

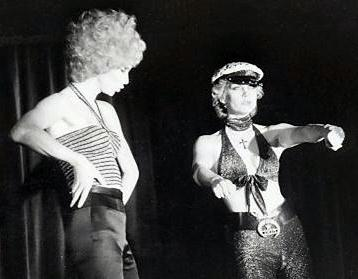
Christer Lindarw and Ulla Jones in Leader of the Pack in Stockholm 1976

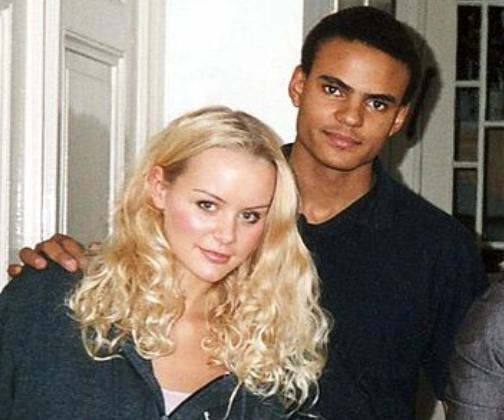
Helena Mattsson and Mohombi Moupondo after a Wild Side Story rehearsal in 2002

Descending from a musical family, Swedish-American producer, author and entertainment director Lars Jacob (stage name of Lars-Erik Jacob Truedson Demitz) went to Florida at the age of 22 to work as a desk clerk at the Doral Hotel, and there part-time also continued his recent Swedish career as a disc jockey. With Logan Carter and a handful of young Cuban refugees who were doing drag in Miami Beach, he created a stage show which did a campy parody of West Side Story, but also included independent material. Wild Side Story first opened officially at the Ambassadors III on August 8, 1973, and by 1974 moved down 22nd Street to Larry Boxx's new Stonewall of Miami Beach; the Florida performances starred Rena Del Rio (Rene Zequeira).

In 1975 Lars Jacob went back to Sweden and produced shows for one of the earliest Stockholm nightclubs Alexandra's, thus introducing drag shows to Sweden. In 1976 he brought his Wild Side Story to the stage there with local people, since a European tour, which Danny La Rue had tried to help him set up, had failed to materialize with the Florida cast because of their refugee status. A few months later he went back to the United States and a front desk job at The Beverly Hills Hotel. On the side he again built up an underground ensemble which intermittently played Wild Side Story, with a few adjustments to Californian culture, at alternating venues from 1977 until the beginning of the 1980s, most prominently at Osko's. In 1976 his basic plot of Wild Side Story had been registered with the Writers Guild of America West by Jacob and business partner Richard Max Mersky of Mimical Productions, and in California they called their show a mimical lampoon. A young Ritch M. Esra was their stage manager.

Until 2004 the show was performed more than 500 times in Florida, Stockholm, Los Angeles and Spain, since 1997 called a mimical humoresque. In Stockholm it ran the longest at Lino Ajello's comedy nightclub Camarillo for the whole summer of 1997. On its 40th anniversary in 2013 all of Wild Side Story was played twice again in a 17th-century cellar cave dedicated to Michelangelo's David in the Old Town of Stockholm.

== Method ==
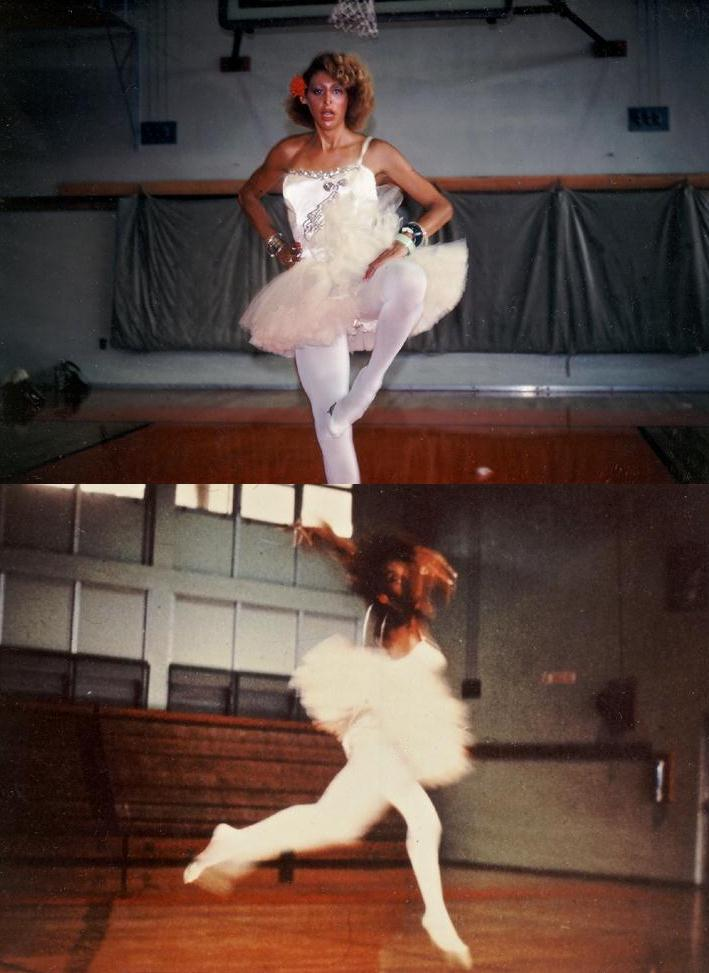
Two of the slides used to introduce The Dance at the Gym since 1974

In the beginning all the songs were performed to playback recordings; later individual combinations of playback, live singing and sound recordings were arranged. That is to say that practically throughout the one-hour show, the cast carried out its roles by lip synching to pre-recorded songs. An overdone type of lip and tongue movement enhanced the cast's satirical treatment of the original recordings used, and of the plot.

The actors were usually young amateurs from the respective local scenes, who made their stage debuts, such as designer Christer Lindarw, model Jimmie Kersmo, male nurse Roger Jönsson, drama college graduates Helena Mattsson, Mohombi Moupondo and Patrik Hont, as well as percussionist Alfredo Chacón and eventual Counter Strike champion Miguel Bonett. Lars Jacob and his Californian production assistant Rosalie De La Torre have both been given credit for discovering Lindarw, who soon became a big star in Sweden. In Los Angeles and in later Swedish productions the piece was played by professional cast members such as Ulla Jones and Pontus Platin and with enhanced scenography and technology.

Three of the nine roles call for male actors to play exaggerated drag queens, and since 1976 three of the roles are also cast with three real women, one of whom plays a drag king. Suddenly when an audience is getting used to the constant lip synching, the character Tony breaks out into a live satire on the Maria song, called Maria in Tony's Thoughts. Show-goers are also taken by surprise with a staged technical failure where one of the actresses stomps her foot and begins swearing out loud till her number just as unexpectedly resumes.

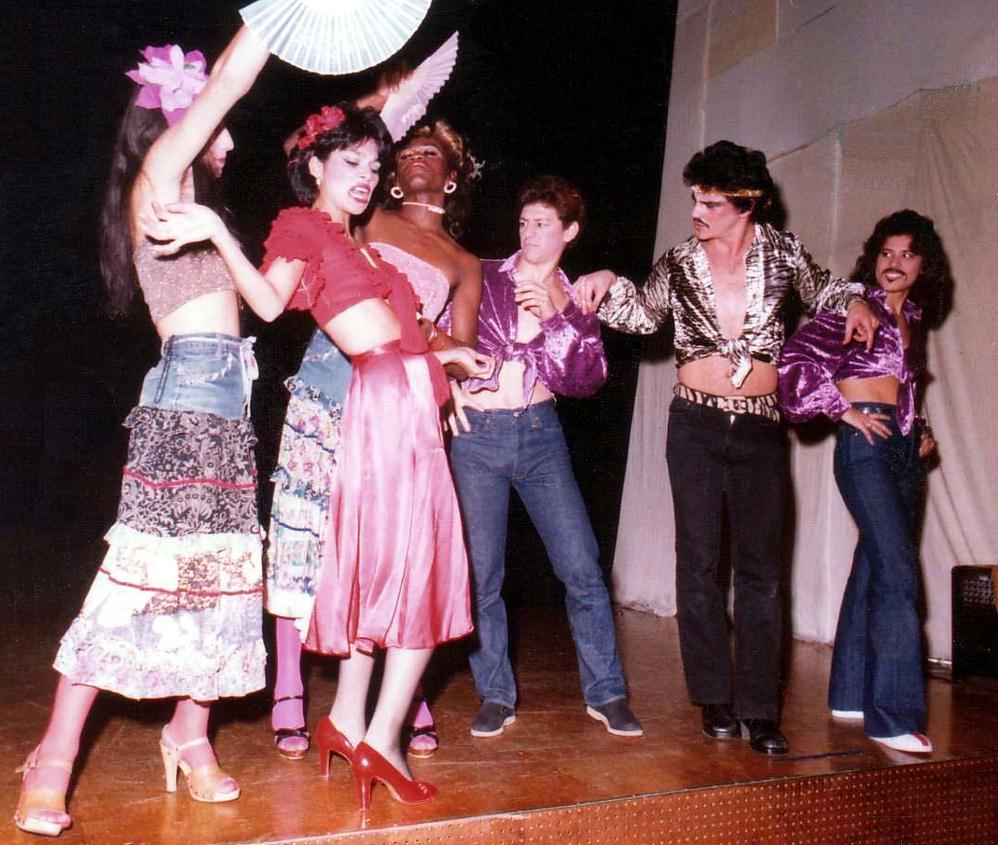
Steve Vigil as Bernardo and other cast members in America, Los Angeles 1977

A few more effects, such as loud foot drumming in America, strobe lighting to slow motion movement and live screams in the catastrophic street Rumble – and intermittent projection of slide photos (some taken in ballet tutus in the gymnasium of Miami Beach High School) and Super 8 film, have completed the multimedia experience. Recorded narration was added in Los Angeles in 1977 to help audiences grasp plot continuity.

Costumes especially designed and created in 1976 by Maria Knutsson of Sweden's popular Gul & Blå boutiques have continued to be used since then, and the same body language that the director found in the young Cubans already in 1972 has also been preserved to a large extent.

== Parody features ==
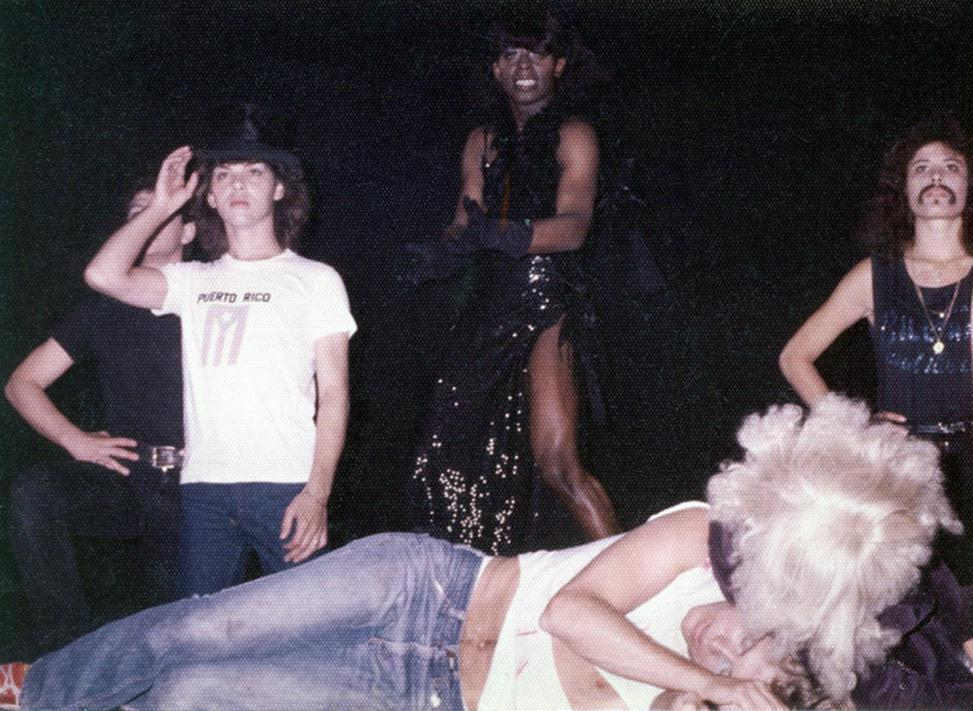
Somewhere 1979 at Osko's in Los Angeles: Consuelo there was Eddy Hampton Armani who would become Tina Turner's unauthorized biographer

With about half the music from the classic musical West Side Story, in several versions including instrumentals and comedy renditions, of course that musical is parodied, especially its suicidal Romeo and Juliet theme.

Other songs are included with Bette Midler, La Lupe, Elvis Presley, Marilyn Monroe, Lou Reed, Alma Cogan (material provided by Adam Faith), Patti Page and Peggy Lee, as well as spicy comments from old Mae West movie scenes, all creating vital parts of the lampoon. In the finale, a Las Vegas performance by Diana Ross of Somewhere comes up, where she quotes "Doctor Martin Luther King" and his dream, while slot machines are making huge money for the hotel. School dancing, sexual and other stereotypes, senseless violence, lovesick carelessness causing blond drunkenness, hippie hypocrisy and the type of comedy of errors reminiscent of Oscar Wilde are also parodied. Pick-pockets, male and female chauvinist pigs, obstructive false eyelashes, mistaken murder and misplaced false boobs are additional spoofed elements.

== Plot ==
The central character José Maria González dresses up so cleverly as a woman, to try to get a job in a drag show, that Tony falls indiscriminately in love, which leads to the main comedy confusion in the plot, and an opening for the cast to parody Romeo and Juliet.

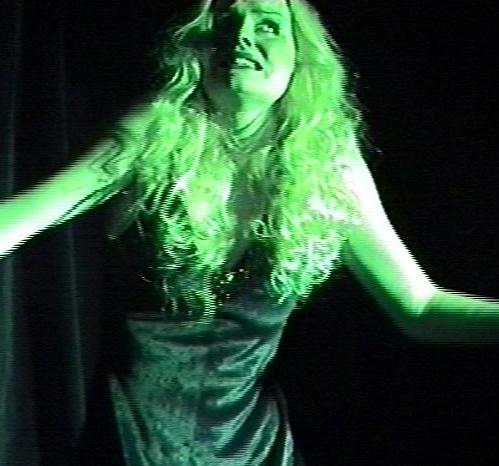
Helena Mattsson's Angst as a deserted Betty-Sue in You Don't Know What Love Is 2003

Competing for that work, and creating a side plot, are two Puerto Rican drag queens Consuelo and Obvióla who make the misunderstood star's life in New York even more miserable, doing A Problem Like Maria in stolen nuns' habits, while Tony stumbles through the streets and sings (even in Spanish or Swedish or German when called for): "Maria, I would never have known or guessed it, but she really is rather flat-chested …".

Mimed Sondheim lyrics are re-performed with new meaning when Maria feels "pretty and witty and gay" and "hardly can believe I'm real" or an infuriated Anita (to a Carol Burnett version) shouts "stick to your own kind!". A reinterpretation of the Tonight song has Tony torn between self-destructive love pangs and ensuing anatomical suspicion, while Maria to the audience begins to regret causing so much trouble, just to find employment, and finally removes his girl clothes and make-up. Shirley Bassey supplies the lyric in the drag show favorite This Is My Life. In Wild Side Story the singer's famous female voice gradually becomes secondary to an increasingly reclaimed masculinity performed by the actor.

Bernardo, Tony and his girlfriend Betty-Sue (a character designed specially for this show) have been killed but come to life at the end once a Soul Goddess, to a Diana Ross song, summons Dr. King's spirit.

== Reception ==
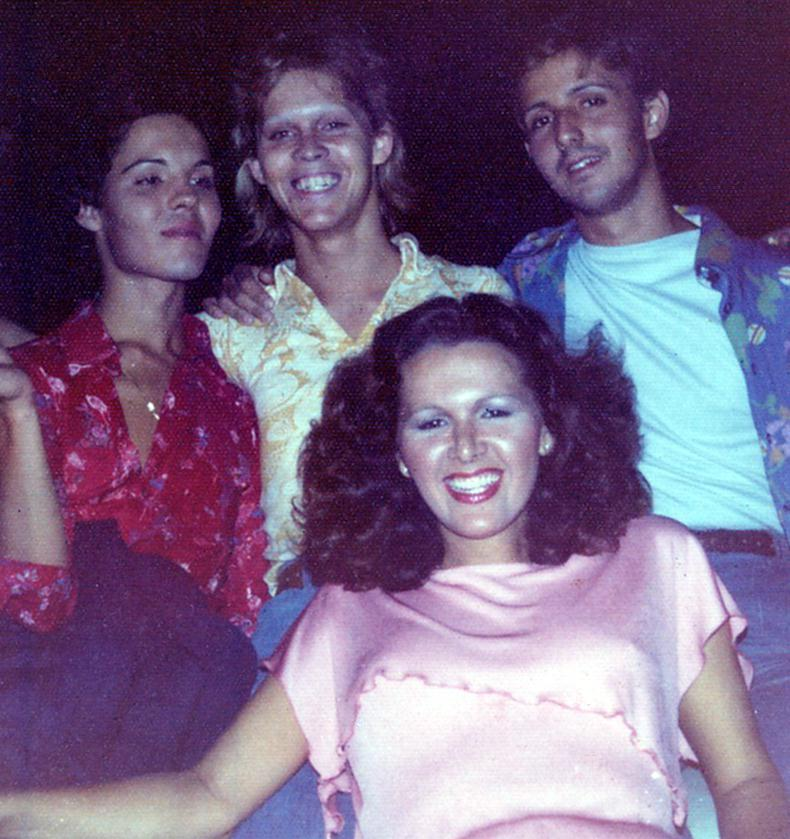
1974 cast members Rena Del Rio, Logan Carter, Peaches Del Monte and Tony Del Valle on tour in Tampa

A 1974 The Miami Magazine cover story describes two of the male Cuban actors as "women who look like women and smell like women and wear frills and satin and ruffles and lace … featuring two such dedicated lovelies modeling the latest in feminine fashions for real women". The show was deemed "a smash hit … Florida's great names in female impersonation acted out their bizarre rolls in this bizarre story so the audiences screamed".

In Stockholm, in the autumn of 1975, Lars Jacob, with Anders Eljas as his debut bandleader and Graham Tainton as his choreographer, had already done well in his first cabaret AlexCab, where drag numbers of an American type were performed for the first time in Sweden. Respected critic Sten Hedman in 1976 called Jacob's next production Wild Side Story the "best show in town … decadent, fun, exciting, talented", with the soon famous Christer Lindarw, playing Obvióla, named as the best in the show. Writers at major newspapers like Dagens Nyheter and Svenska Dagbladet struggled to decide whether to praise or bash such a totally new phenomenon as Wild Side Story, and their reviews came out perplexed. The latter singled out Steve Vigil in the leading role, as well as Ulla Jones as Betty-Sue and Agneta Lindén as Anita, for charisma and know-how. Vigil had seen Wild Side Story in Florida as early as 1974 and went on after Stockholm to play Bernardo in the California production 1977–1980.

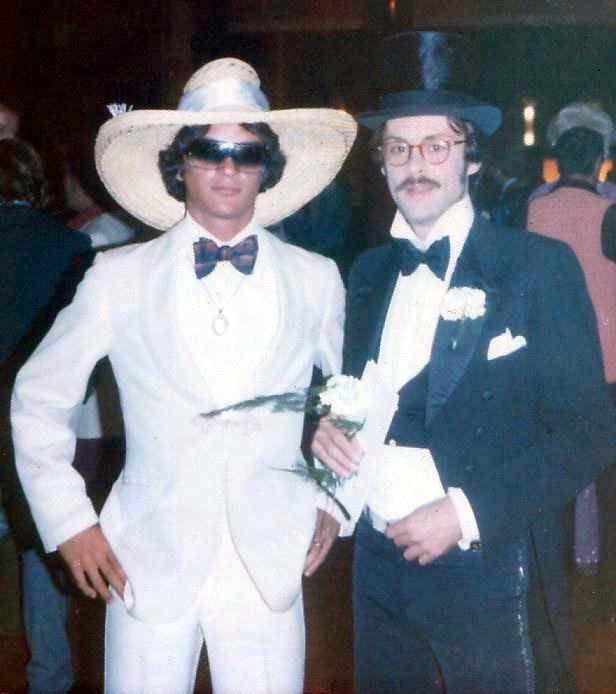
Steve Vigil and Lars Jacob at the Miss David Pageant in Florida in 1974.

A few years later in Los Angeles, journalist Michael Kearns headlined his review with Wild Side Story as "the talk of the town", mentioned celebrities in the audience (such as Lehman Engel and Boz Scaggs) and added "the most unusual thing you've ever seen", while a local gay magazine called it a "fun, campy evening's entertainment" and "the cast is lively and Jacob's direction is fast paced … a dashing Tony … beautiful, touching, tender Maria …" and the two drag queens "the riotous part of the show".

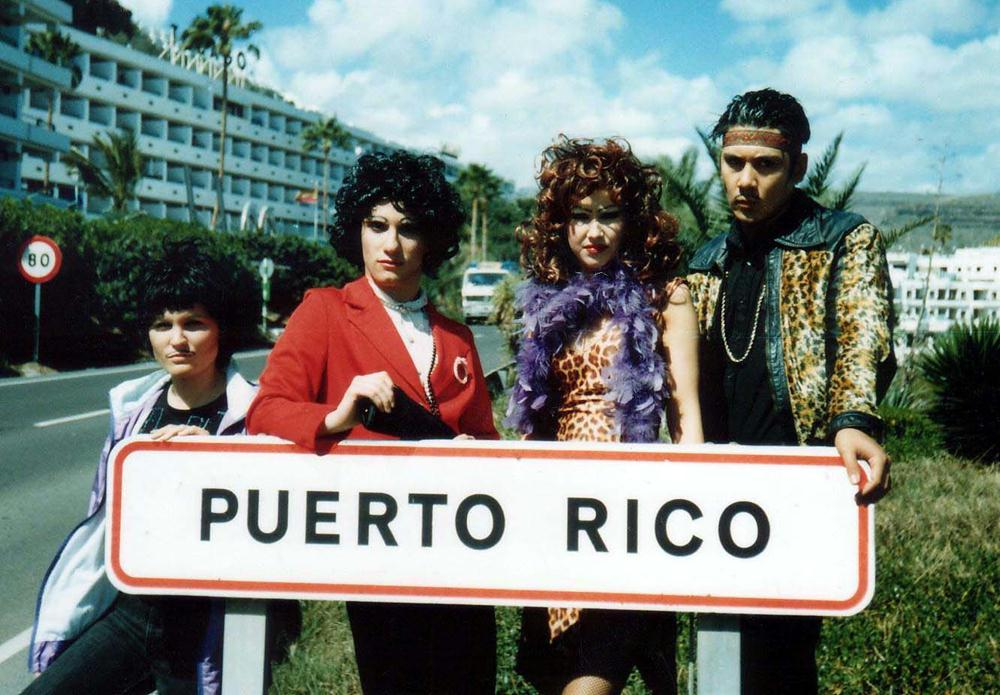
Cast members in Puerto Rico de Gran Canaria in Spain in 2000

In 1997, again in Stockholm, reviewers made comments like "a completely wild evening" and "a hilarious parody, an inspiring show of ingenuity, an alternative hysterical", and in Spain in 2000 the show's and its director's histories were highlighted advantageously. Later that year another Stockholm writer for the first time called Wild Side Story a "cult show". In 2003 and 2004 the capital city's tourism people in their magazine called the piece "a cult classic … wonderful evening of singing, dancing and music in a fast-paced parody", with "laughter, fun, pantomime, dancing and music, Wild Side Story pokes fun at the foibles of human behavior and much more". In 2003 the drag queens were noted by Sweden's leading gay publication as played by "rather beefy guys with hairy armpits".

== Core themes ==
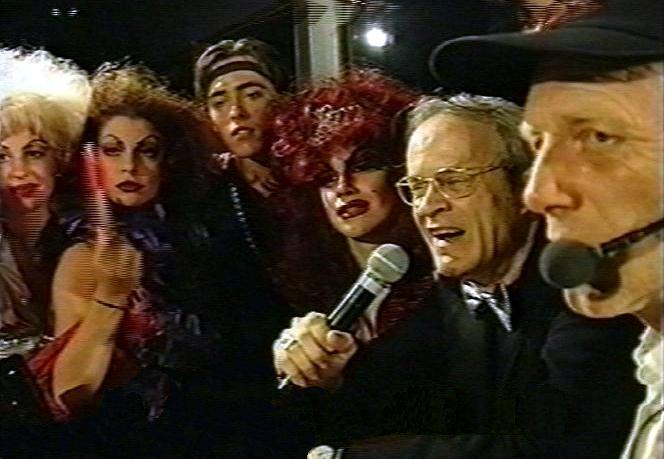
Lars Jacob with 1997 cast members at the end of a TV interview conducted by Gert Fylking

Lars Jacob has been interviewed on television in Sweden about Wild Side Story. In a live broadcast for the public access station Öppna Kanalen in 1997 he said: "Since I was 13-14 years old I've always found it so confusing with all the sexual hypocrisy we have in society, and religious hypocrisy and political hypocrisy, so I'm an anti-hypocrisy fanatic – that's the only thing I'm fanatic about, being against hypocrisy – so that makes it great fun to joke around with double standards and the over-romantization of society, which means that young people hardly have a chance to make it, with all this propaganda we have for romance."

Again in 2000 he appeared as the director of Wild Side Story on Channel 3 in four segments of a popular TV series by Strix (Baren), where he said "there's nothing really lewd in the show, but there's a lot of fun poked at sexuality and romance and True Love and all that", and speaking of yet another brave cast of his, "I think it's great with people who dare, and people who make something special out of life, not like Princess Madeleine like 'I want to live a regular life' – huh? My God! She belongs to five of the most unusual families in the world, this girl, and the poor thing is forced to say things like 'I want to live a regular life'!".
