= Muddy Waters (album) =

Studio album by Redman
- Released: December 10, 1996
- Recorded: 1995–1996
- Studio: Rockin' Reel Recording Studios (New York, NY); Mirror Image Studios (New York, NY)
- Genre: East Coast hip-hop
- Length: 1:07:17
- Label: Def Squad; Def Jam
- Producer: Erick Sermon; Jerry Wonda; Pras; Redman; Rockwilder; Ty Fyffe

Redman chronology
Dare Iz a Darkside (1994)	Muddy Waters (1996)	El Niño (1998)

Singles from Muddy Waters
- 1. "It's Like That (My Big Brother)" Released: 1996; 2. "Whateva Man" Released: January 28, 1997; 3. "Pick It Up" Released: May 13, 1997; 4. "Smoke Buddah" Released: 1997

Muddy Waters is the third studio album by American rapper Redman. It was released on December 10, 1996, through Def Squad Records and Def Jam Recordings. The recording sessions took place at Mirror Image and Rockin' Reel Recording Studios in New York City. The album was produced by Erick Sermon, who also served as executive producer, Rockwilder, Jerry Duplessis, Pras, Ty Fyffe, and Redman. It features guest appearances from Erick Sermon, Jamal, Keith Murray, K-Solo, Method Man, Napalm, and Rockwilder. The album debuted at number 12 on the Billboard 200 and topped the Top R&B/Hip-Hop Albums chart in the United States. It was certified Gold by the Recording Industry Association of America on February 12, 1997, for exceeding shipments of 500,000 copies. The album spawned three charted singles: "It's Like That (My Big Brother)", "Whateva Man" and "Pick It Up" and a promotional single "Smoke Buddah".

On December 24, 2024, Redman released a sequel to the album under the title Muddy Waters Too.

== Critical reception ==
Professional ratings
Review scores
Source	Rating
AllMusic	4/5 stars
The Encyclopedia of Popular Music	4/5 stars
Muzik	8/10
Q	3/5 stars
RapReviews	10/10
The Source	4/5 stars

Muddy Waters was met with generally favourable reviews from music critics. Steve Huey of AllMusic, though critical of the album's numerous interludes, stated that "lyrically, Redman is as strong as ever", and of the overall work, remarked that "Muddy Waters solidifies Redman's growing reputation as one of the most consistent rappers of the '90s".

Redman has stated that he had planned on releasing a sequel to the album entitled Muddy Waters 2, considering it is his most classic work. The album was ultimately released on December 24, 2024, styled as Muddy Waters Too.

== Commercial performance ==
In the United States, the album debuted at number 12 on the Billboard 200 on the week of December 28, 1996, and stayed on the chart for 17 weeks. On the Billboard Top R&B/Hip-Hop Albums chart, Muddy Waters repeated the success of his predecessor, Dare Iz a Darkside, also debuting at number-one. On February 12, 1997, the album received gold status from the RIAA for selling half a million units. As of October 2009, the album has 767,000 copies sold in the US alone.

The album's lead single, a reunion duet with former Hit Squad group-mate K-Solo "It's Like That", peaked at number 95 on the Billboard Hot 100. A follow-up single from the album, "Whateva Man", reached number 42 on the same chart. The third and final single off of the project, "Pick It Up", did not made it to the Hot 100, however, it found mild success on R&B/Hip-Hop and Rap Songs charts.

In the United Kingdom, the album managed to debut only on the Hip Hop and R&B Albums Chart at number 27. The album repeated its success twice, again climbing to the 27th spot on this chart in the weeks ending January 25 and February 1, 1997. None of its singles went charted.

The album debuted in Germany at number 100 on the chart in the week of February 10, 1997, becoming the rapper's first album to break through in the country.

== Track listing ==
No.	Title	Writer(s)	Producer(s)	Length
1.	"Intro"	Reggie Noble	Redman	2:17
2.	"Iz He 4 Real"	Noble; Erick Sermon; Jack McNair; Jahmal Bush; Dashawn Yates; Sean Price; Barret Powell; Paul Hendricks	Erick Sermon; Redman	1:36
3.	"Rock Da Spot"	Noble; Sermon; Tyrone Fyffe; Christopher Wallace; Robert Kelly; Chris Martin; Trevor Smith; Galt MacDermot; Parrish Smith; Roger Troutman	Erick Sermon; Sugarless	4:11
4.	"Welcome" (Interlude)	Noble; Sermon	Erick Sermon	2:06
5.	"Case Closed" (featuring Napalm and Rockwilder)	Noble; A. Stanton; Dana Stinson	Rockwilder	2:58
6.	"Pick It Up"	Noble; Sermon	Erick Sermon	4:11
7.	"N.I.N. (Skit)" (featuring Chris Tricarico)	Noble	Redman	0:57
8.	"Smoke Buddah"	Noble; Rick James	Redman	2:34
9.	"Whateva Man" (featuring Erick Sermon)	Noble; Sermon	Erick Sermon	3:09
10.	"Chicken Head Convention" (Skit)	Noble	Redman	1:17
11.	"On Fire"	Noble; Sermon	Erick Sermon	3:50
12.	"Do What U Feel" (featuring Method Man)	Noble; Clifford Smith; Pras Michel	Pras; Te-Bass	4:14
13.	"The Stick Up" (Skit)	Noble	Redman	0:55
14.	"Creepin'"	Noble	Redman	4:00
15.	"It's Like That (My Big Brother)" (featuring K-Solo)	Noble; Kevin Madison; Joseph Williams; Kurtis Khaleel	Redman	2:55
16.	"Da Bump"	Noble; Sermon; Isaac Hayes; Darryl Ellis; Paul Richmond; Ruben Locke Jr.	Erick Sermon	4:11
17.	"Uncle Quilly (Skit)" (featuring Naja)	Noble; George Clinton	Redman	0:59
18.	"Yesh Yesh Ya'll"	Noble; Sermon; Lonnie Lynn; Dion Wilson; James Savage; Jason Mizell; Anthony Pearyer; William Patterson	Erick Sermon	3:59
19.	"What U Lookin' 4"	Noble; Stinson; Ernie Isley; Marvin Isley; O'Kelly Isley Jr.; Ronald Isley; Rudolph Isley; Chris Jasper	Rockwilder; Redman (co.)	4:07
20.	"Soopaman Luva 3 Interview" (Skit)	Noble; Sermon; Alfonzo Hunter; Bill Withers; Stanley McKenney	Redman	0:55
21.	"Soopaman Luva 3"	Noble; Sermon; Jimmy Heath	Erick Sermon; Redman	4:12
22.	"Rollin'"	Noble; Sermon; Eric Barrier; William Griffin	Erick Sermon	4:09
23.	"Da Ill Out" (featuring Jamal and Keith Murray)	Noble; Jamal Phillips; Keith Murray; Sermon	Erick Sermon	3:35
Total length:				1:07:17

== Personnel ==
- Reginald "Redman" Noble – vocals, producer (tracks: 1, 2, 7, 8, 10, 13–15, 17, 20, 21), co-producer (track 19)
- Dana "Rockwilder" Stinson – vocals (track 5), producer (tracks: 5, 19)
- A. "Napalm" Stanton – vocals (track 5)
- Chris Tricarico – vocals (track 7)
- Erick Sermon – vocals (track 9), producer (tracks: 2–4, 6, 9, 11, 16, 18, 21–23), executive producer
- Clifford "Method Man" Smith – vocals (track 12)
- Kevin "K-Solo" Madison – vocals (track 15)
- Naja – vocals (track 17)
- Jamal "Mally G" Phillips – vocals (track 23)
- Keith Murray – vocals (track 23)
- Tyrone "Ty" Fyffe – producer (track 3)
- Prakazrel "Pras" Michél – producer (track 12)
- Jerry "Wonda" Duplessis – producer (track 12)
- Dave Greenberg – recording (tracks: 1, 2, 5, 7, 10, 13, 14, 17, 19, 21, 23), mixing (tracks: 1, 7, 10, 12, 13, 14, 17, 19)
- Troy Hightower – recording (tracks: 3, 4, 6, 8, 9, 11, 12, 15, 16, 18, 20–22), mixing (tracks: 2–6, 8, 9, 11, 15, 16, 18, 20–23)
- Tony Dawsey – mastering
- The Drawing Board – art direction, design
- Nina Schultz – photography
- Kevin Liles – A&R

== Charts ==
=== Weekly charts ===
Chart (1996)	Peak position
German Albums (Offizielle Top 100)	100
UK R&B Albums (OCC)	27
US Billboard 200	12
US Top R&B/Hip-Hop Albums (Billboard)	1

=== Year-end charts ===
Chart (1997)	Position
US Billboard 200	125
US Top R&B/Hip-Hop Albums (Billboard)	24

== Certifications ==
Region	Certification	Certified units/sales
United States (RIAA)	Gold	500,000^{^}
^{^} Shipments figures based on certification alone.

== See also ==
- List of Billboard number-one R&B albums of 1996
