= It's Like That (My Big Brother) =

Single by Redman and K-Solo

from the album Muddy Waters
- Released: December 10, 1996
- Studio: Rockin' Reel Recording Studios (New York, NY)
- Genre: Hip hop
- Length: 2:55
- Label: Def Jam
- Songwriters: Reggie Noble; Joseph Williams; Kurtis Khaleel
- Producers: Redman; Erick Sermon (co.)

Redman singles chronology
"Funkorama" (1995)	"It's Like That (My Big Brother)" (1996)	"Whateva Man" (1997)

K-Solo singles chronology
"Headbanger" (1992)	"It's Like That" (1996)

Music video
- "It's Like That" on YouTube

"It's Like That (My Big Brother)" is a song by American rapper and producer Redman. It was released on December 10, 1996, through Def Jam Recordings as the lead single from the rapper's third studio album Muddy Waters. Recording sessions took place at Rockin' Reel Recording Studios in New York City. Production was handled by Redman himself with Erick Sermon serving as co-producer. The song features rapping from fellow Hit Squad member K-Solo and contains a sample from Just-Ice's "Cold Getting Dumb".

The song peaked at number 95 on the Billboard Hot 100, number 40 on the Hot R&B/Hip-Hop Songs, number 62 on the R&B/Hip-Hop Airplay, number 11 on the Hot Rap Songs and number 2 on the Dance Singles Sales in the United States.

In 2016, Complex ranked the song at No. 47 on their 'The Best Rap Songs of 1996' list.

== Track listing ==
No.	Title	Length
1.	"It's Like That (My Big Brother)" (Radio Edit)
2.	"That's How It Is (It's Like That)" (Radio Edit)
3.	"It's Like That (My Big Brother)" (Instrumental)
4.	"It's Like That (My Big Brother)" (LP Version)
5.	"It's Like That (My Big Brother)" (A Cappella)

== Personnel ==
- Reginald "Redman" Noble – songwriter, rap vocals, producer
- Kevin "K-Solo" Madison – rap vocals
- Erick Sermon – co-producer
- Dave Greenberg – recording
- Troy Hightower – mixing
- Tony Dawsey – mastering
- Joseph "Just-Ice" Williams – songwriter (via sample)
- Kurtis Mantronik – songwriter (via sample)

== Charts ==
Chart (1996)	Peak position
US Billboard Hot 100	95
US Hot R&B/Hip-Hop Songs (Billboard)	40
US R&B/Hip-Hop Airplay (Billboard)	62
US Hot Rap Songs (Billboard)	11
US Dance Singles Sales (Billboard)	2
