= K-Solo =

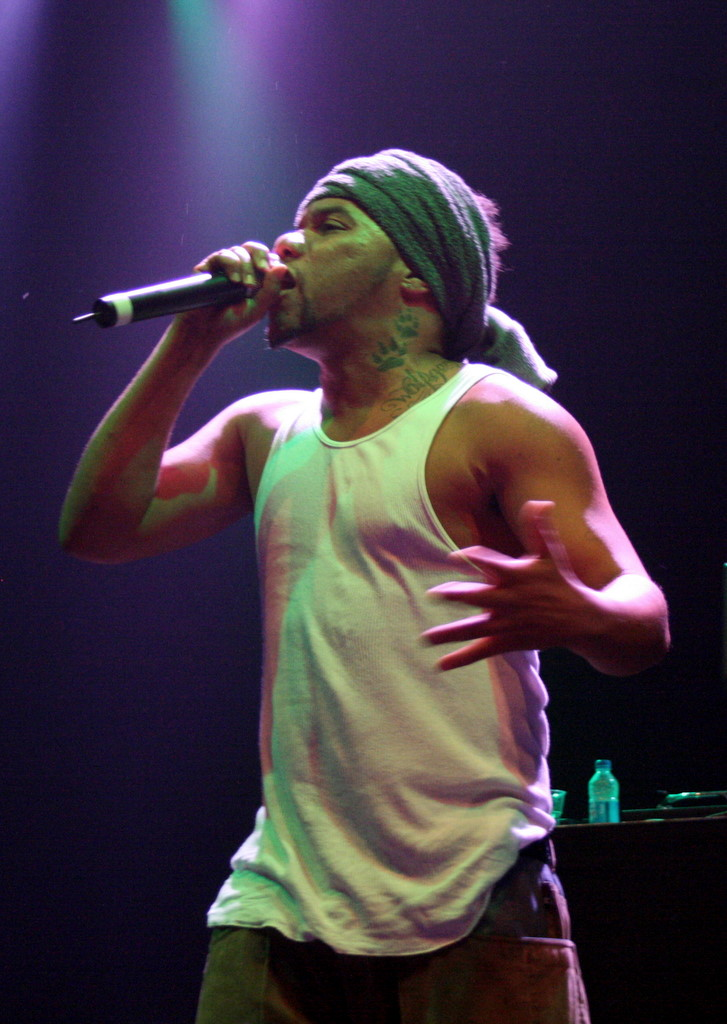
- Performing In Europe

Background information
- Also known as: Wolfgang Murder Mouth
- Born: Kevin Madison; April 17, 1965 (age 61); Brentwood, New York, U.S.
- Genres: Hip-hop; East Coast hip-hop
- Occupations: Rapper; record producer; songwriter
- Instrument: Rapping
- Years active: 1989–present
- Labels: Atlantic; Waste Management
- Formerly of: Hit Squad
- Website: --- K-Solo Myspace; ---Waste Management Records

Kevin Madison, also known as K-Solo (born April 17, 1968) is an American rapper from Brentwood, New York who, along with Redman, EPMD, Das EFX, and Keith Murray, was part of the Hit Squad in the 1990s.

== Career ==
K-Solo's career in hip-hop started through running with PMD's elder brother Smitty D's Rock Squad until he was kicked out for getting in trouble. After serving a prison stint, later the material for his single "Fugitive", PMD reunited with Solo and inducted him as the inaugural member of EPMD's "Hit Squad" on "Knick Knack Patty Wack" off EPMD's sophomore opus Unfinished Business. He then released his debut album Tell the World My Name, which peaked at No. 45 on the Top R&B Albums chart. The album was fully produced by PMD, with the exception of the Hot Rap Songs chart hit "Spellbound" which was Erick Sermon's production debut. Another hit from the album was "Your Moms In My Business", which stayed on the Hot Rap Songs chart for 14 weeks, peaking at No. 2. In 1992, K-Solo furthered his Hit Squad tenure with his sophomore album Time's Up where he discovered Sam Sneed. The album peaked on two Billboard charts: No. 135 on the Billboard 200 and No. 36 on the Top R&B Albums and resulted the singles "Letterman" and "I Can't Hold It Back", which respectively peaked at No. 4 & No. 24 on the Hot Rap Singles. K-Solo then followed that with a guest feature on EPMD's Hit Squad showcase Head Banger with Redman, which reached No. 11 and No. 75 on the Hot Rap Singles & Hot R&B Singles charts, respectively. When EPMD broke up, Solo told PMD he was leaving the Hit Squad and they parted ways amicably.

After EPMD broke up, K-Solo followed Sam Sneed to Death Row Records after hooking up with them at a Pittsburgh concert show. The only tracks ever released was a few bootlegs, including one of Kurupt and Solo freestyling over Snoop's "Gin and Juice". In 1996, Solo collaborated with Redman on "It's Like That (My Big Brother)". This was supposed to reestablish K-Solo under the Def Squad umbrella, but nothing ever materialized.

In 2003 he toured the world with PMD and DJ Honda, after appearing on The Awakening.

In 2004 he was working on a new album for his Waste Management Records tentatively titled "There Will Be Hell to Pay" which has not been released.

== Feuds ==
=== DMX ===
During the mid-1990s through the early 2000s (decade), DMX and K-Solo, who first met as inmates in prison during the course of K-Solo's three-year prison stint, disputed over who was the first to write "Spellbound". Despite that K-Solo released his version in 1990, DMX, who released his version in 1991, claimed that he was the first to write "Spellbound". In his 1998 hit single "Get At Me Dog", DMX told K-Solo to "suck [his] dick". K-Solo later responded to DMX on a track named "The Answer Back", in which K-Solo claimed to be DMX's real father, and alleged that the legitimate reason for DMX's disgruntlement was because K-Solo had given DMX's mother a sexually transmitted infection. As the track continues, K-Solo went on to vindicate himself by saying that it was in fact DMX's mother who had "burned" him first. On Beef II, K-Solo took a lie detector test to prove that he was the first to write "Spellbound". The results were inconclusive.

In an August 2006 interview, he said "The truth of the matter is that being in L.A., I have people that I never would in LA, like Tito Ortiz, Chuck Lidell, true beat-that-ass-niggas. I have personally talked to the UFC folks and they would love to see us fight, I would love to see us fight. I mean we are forever going to be linked in the beef shit because there has not been a clear winner. I feel that I destroyed him, I assume he feels the same. It’s obvious we both don’t like each other and I think it’s the only way to settle this beef, but let’s face it, I saw dude do 50 push-ups and almost fall down afterwards. It took like 10 minutes to catch his breath to smoke another cigarette. Obviously he is not ready for that. It would be the biggest deal in hip-hop in 20 years."

In a January 2007 interview, he was asked why DMX continued to seek conflict, especially with his recent appearance on Hot 97 and stated "He knows what it is. I told him to get into the cage with me. Five rounds, homie, fight me! He wouldn't do it. I am asking Keith Murray to do the same. I’ll break his ass down in two. He’s a five dollar dude. Sign the papers, we’ll set it up, and can handle it. That goes for any ma’fucka who has problems with me. We’ll get in the cage. If you can beat me, you get the money and I’ll get my ass beat. Let people do what they got to do. I’m in war mode. I’m more ready now than I've ever been. People aren't getting away with that dumb shit. DMX can’t fight."

K-Solo has since become very complimentary of DMX after the latter's passing in 2021, detailing how he visited his former rival's grave and even shed tears reflecting on their troubled history.

=== Keith Murray ===
In a January 2007 interview, he responded to claims that he [Keith] knocked him out:

"I was in the hood watching these guys. I ran with one of these guys who was in the hood. A while back, my boy – Ralph Mann got jumped by a few of the L.O.D. cats Keith Murray’s crew]. They were disrespecting Ralph! I put Murray and Redman in the game! So, I put they asses on blast on a mixtape! Murray’s men jumped me on stage and threw me off the bitch. They’re now in court because of the shit. But let me ask you -- how do I get jumped in your club on Christmas Eve and walk out still alright? I could’ve respected it if Murray ran up on me and did his thing. But he didn’t. He thinks that the world is against him. If there was no Kevin Madison there wouldn’t be no Keith Murray, because no one would’ve respected him. Why fight someone that put you on? The only thing that I can think is that Reggie and Erick put him on to doing it. These cats are crazy, though. People were hurt when the Hit Squad broke up. I know people who can call on J. Prince and really cause some problems. Cats are just stupid. That’s the only thing that aggravates me. What else do I have to do to show people that I’m the “original rap criminal”? People don't know what they're playing with."

After Redman contacted both rappers, K-Solo and Keith Murray squashed the beef and have since performed together on multiple Hit Squad shows. K-Solo has even shouted Murray out in numerous interviews since.

== Discography ==
=== Albums ===
Year	Title	Chart positions	
Year	Title	Billboard 200	Top R&B/Hip hop Albums
1990	Tell the World My Name	-	No. 45
1992	Time's Up	No. 135	No. 36

=== Singles ===
Year	Title	Chart positions	Album
Year	Title	Hot rap singles	Album
1990	"Spellbound"	No. 7	Tell the World My Name
1990	"Your Mom's in My Business"	No. 2	Tell the World My Name
1991	"Fugitive"	No. 24	Tell the World My Name
1992	"I Can't Hold It Back"	No. 24	Time's Up
1993	"Letterman"	No. 4	Time's Up

== Filmography ==
- Beef II (2004)
- 2fast2real (2004)
- 2Fast2real3 (2008)
