= That's Nifty! =

No Time No Space No Age No Race That's Nifty!

Studio album by Ulla Jones
- Released: 1979
- Recorded: January 1979; Studio Decibel(Sweden)
- Genre: Electronic, folk, world, country, Pop
- Length: 39.24
- Label: Four Leaf Clover
- Producer: Lasse Samuelson; Björn J:son Lindh

No Time No Space No Age No Race That's Nifty! is the debut studio album by Swedish model and actress Ulla Jones.

== Production and arrangement ==
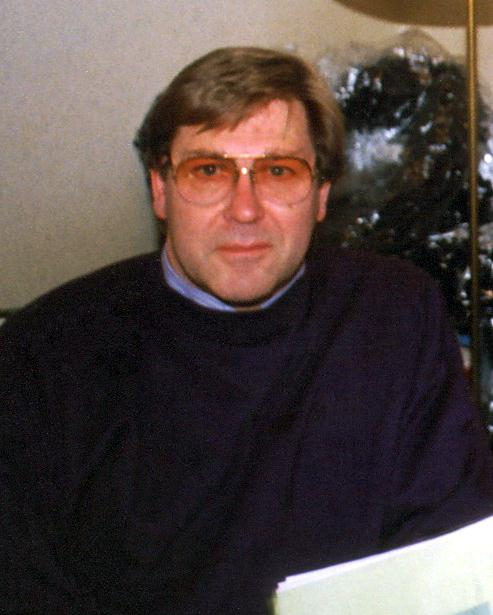
Lasse Samuelson(left)

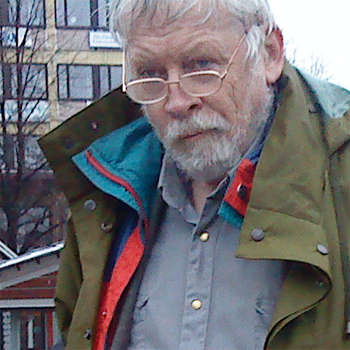
Bengt Göran Staaf(right)

That's Nifty was released under Swedish record label "Four Leaf Records". It was produced by Swedish musician and fellow Four Leaf Clover artist Lasse Samuelson and Swedish flautist, keyboardist and composer Björn J:son Lindh, who also released albums under Four Leaf Clover Records. That's Nifty was recorded and released in 1979. The album was recorded at Studio Decibel in Sweden with Goran Staaf serving as a technician and had Bengt Göran Staaf serving as Engineer.

The album artwork was shot by Little Magnus & Big Appel and Johann Rönn. The cover of the album features Ulla Jones wearing a black and white striped shirt and a light blue tie with short dirty blonde hair.

== Writing ==
Ulla Jones performed and wrote eleven of the twelve songs, except "Long Legged Thilly", which was sung by Swedish singer Turid Lundqvist and written by Jo-Ellen Lapidus who wrote it about Ulla.

== Track listing ==
No.	Title	Writer(s)	Length
1.	"Are You Attentive"	Ulla Jones	3:35
2.	"Poor Little Rich Girl"	Jones	4:07
3.	"Frozen Heart"	Jones	3:55
4.	"May of the West"	Jones	2:41
5.	"The Man from Tibet"	Jones	2:55
6.	"What Is Love"	Jones	1:43
7.	"Life Is a Process"	Jones	3:21
8.	"Mother and Her Son"	Jones	3:07
9.	"Greed Greed"	Jones	3:25
10.	"Bangin' On"	Jones	4:24
11.	"Come 'n Lay"	Jones	2:00
12.	"Long Legged Philly" (Turid Lundqvist)	Jo-Ellen Lapidus	1:50
Total length:			43:14

== Release ==
The album was originally released as a vinyl LP in 1979. It was later made available for digital download throughout digital outlets including iTunes, Spotify, and Amazon MP3.
