= Quincy Jones III =

Music and documentary film producer

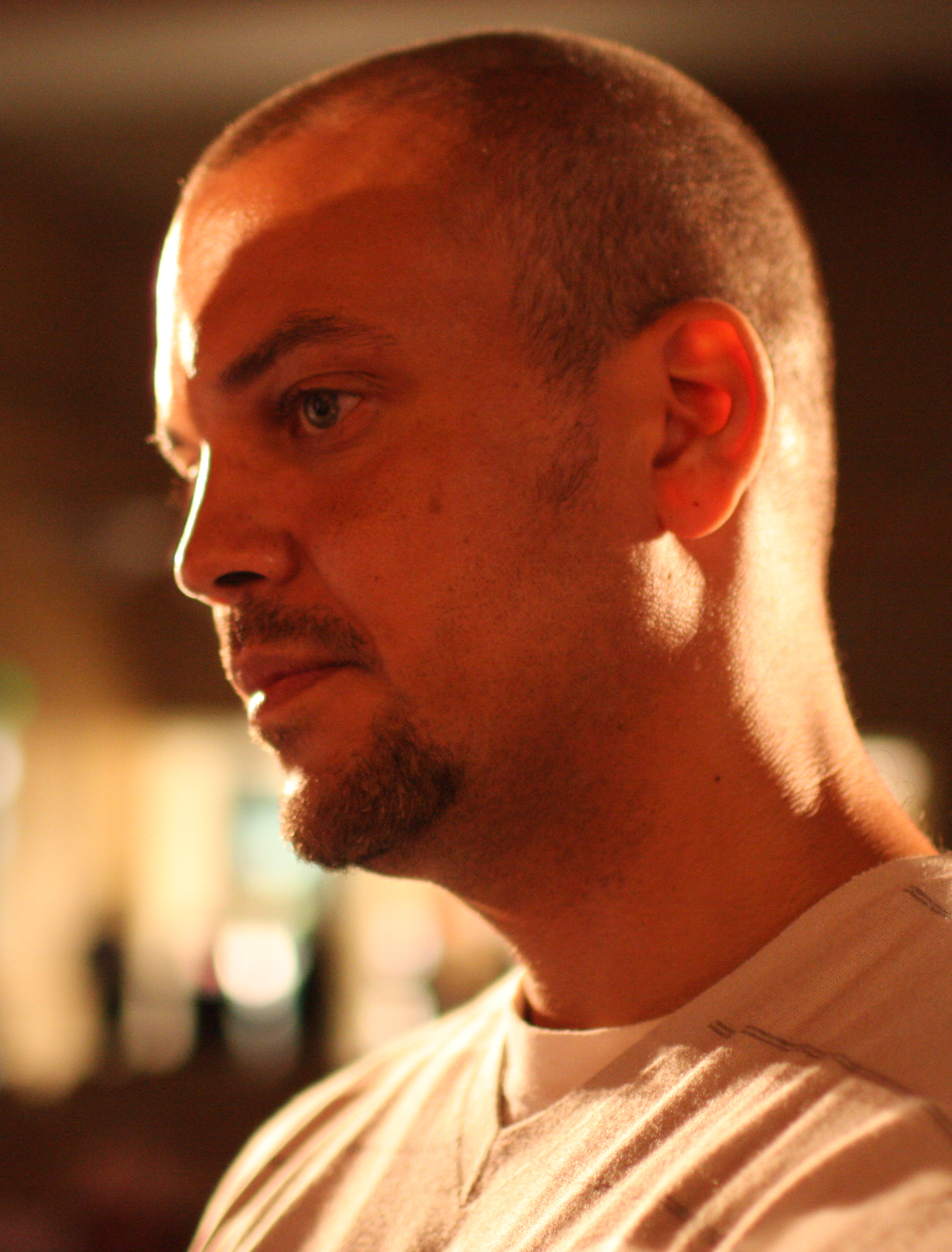
- Jones in 2008
- Born: Quincy Delight Jones III; 23 December 1968 (age 57); London, England
- Other names: QDIII; QD3; Snoopy
- Occupations: Record producer, composer
- Children: 2
- Parents: Quincy Jones (father); Ulla Andersson (mother)
- Relatives: Kidada Jones (half-sister); Rashida Jones (half-sister); Kenya Kinski-Jones (half-sister); Richard A. Jones (uncle)
- Musical career
- Genre: Hip hop
- Labels: Qwest; Reprise; Warner Bros.; QDIII Soundlab, Inc.

Quincy Delight Jones III (born 23 December 1968), better known as QDIII, QD3 and Snoopy, is a Swedish-American music producer, composer and documentary film producer. He is the son of American record producer Quincy Jones Jr. and his second wife, Swedish model Ulla Jones.

== Family ==
Jones was born in Wimbledon, London, the only son of American musician-music producer Quincy Jones Jr. and his second wife, Swedish model Ulla (née Andersson). He grew up in Sweden with his older sister Martina after their parents legally separated. The two have five American half-sisters from their father's two other marriages and relationships in the United States, including actresses Kidada and Rashida Jones and fashion model Kenya Kinski-Jones.

== Career ==
Jones is the founder of QD3 Entertainment, which has produced a series of documentaries known collectively as Beef. These explore the violence and feuds within hip hop culture. Jones is also a hip hop DJ; he released an album called Soundlab (1991).

Jones has also ventured into composing, scoring the music for the films Menace II Society (1993), Thicker than Water (1999), and Pootie Tang (2001), as well as for the television series Out All Night, The Fresh Prince of Bel-Air, In the House, Grown Ups and The PJs.

On 4 November 2009, Chamillionaire launched the Global Innovation Tournament 2009 with Jones at Stanford University as part of the Stanford Entrepreneurial Thought Leaders Seminar Series.

In 2011, Jones co-founded the health and wellness lifestyle company Feel Rich, Inc. with business partner Shawn Ullman, which aimed at promoting "health as the new wealth" to urban communities.

In January 2014, Jones founded WeMash, an Internet service that connects owners of content (movie studios, news organizations, sports entities, music labels/publishers) with creators from every field (video artists, filmmakers, musicians, and more) to reimagine content beyond its original context. Investors include venture capital firm Andreessen Horowitz.

In 2017, along with Jones' father, Grammy winning producer Quincy Jones, they produced a documentary film, Feel Rich: Health is the New Wealth, that featured celebrities, hip hop icons, and medical and health professionals discussing wellness in the urban community.

Jones was a jury member of Swedish Idol 2016.

== Personal life ==
Jones has 2 children from his marriage to his former wife Koa Jones.

== Lil Wayne lawsuit ==
On November 6, 2012, Jones was awarded $2.2mn in a lawsuit against rapper Lil Wayne, over Jones's biopic "The Carter". The pair sued each other over the film, with Wayne's original lawsuit — which was thrown out — claimed Jones' documentary was a "scandalous portrayal" of Wayne and his work. Jones's eventually successful suit — in large part due to the judge's interpretation of Wayne's deposition tape — alleged Wayne's claims hurt the reputation and sales of the film.

== Discography ==
=== Solo albums ===
- 1991: Soundlab (Qwest/Reprise/Warner Bros. Records 26574) featuring Justin Warfield

== Films and documentaries ==
- 1987: Stockholmsnatt as Quincy. Also narrating.
- 2002: The Freshest Kids: A History of the B-Boy (as producer, QD3 Entertainment)
- 2006: Beef: The Series (QD3 Entertainment)
  - Beef (4 October 2006)
  - Beef II (11 October 2006)
  - Beef III (16 October 2006)
  - Beef IV (25 October 2006)
  - Beef V (1 November 2006)
  - Beef VI (8 November 2006)
  - The Carter (2009)
  - Beef: Behind the Bullet (9 February 2011)
  - Tupac: Thug Angel (2011)
  - Dear Mama: The Saga of Afeni and Tupac Shakur is an American television documentary series about Tupac Shakur and his mother Afeni Shakur, directed by Allen Hughes. It premiered on FX on April 21, 2023.

== Bibliography ==
- Q, The Autobiography of Quincy Jones
