= Beef: The Series =

- Narrated by: Andrew Kishino
- Country of origin: United States

Production
- Running time: 30 minutes

Original release
- Network: BET
- Release: October 4 – November 8, 2006

Beef: The Series is a television series that aired on Black Entertainment Television (BET). The show premiered on October 4, 2006, and aired six episodes for the first season, with the last original episode airing on November 8, 2006. Due to the lack of numbers in ratings, BET did not continue the Beef series.

Based on the documentary series that premiered on DVD starting in 2003 (which spawned two sequels, each in 2004 and 2005), this series explores arguments and feuds in the hip-hop genre and beyond. Those also include personal conflicts between those in both the sports and entertainment worlds, as well politics. DeRay Davis is featured in wraparound segments, speaking with ordinary people about who would they "beef" with when it comes to personal conflict.

The show was executive produced by Quincy D. Jones III (QD3).

No.	Original release date
1	October 4, 2006
The premiere episode features the conflict between supermodels/actresses Tyra Banks and Naomi Campbell. Also, the damaged relationship between Dogg Pound members Daz Dillinger and Kurupt (in which Kurupt goes back to Death Row Records to work for embattled mogul Suge Knight) and their reunion, plus the beef between teen rappers Bow Wow and Lil' Romeo, and a major feud among the Houston rap community, upon the death of hometown rap legend DJ Screw on who originated the chopped and screwed style of hip-hop.
2	October 11, 2006
This episode features the rise and fall of the partnership of Roc-A-Fella Records founders Jay-Z and Damon Dash. Also, Ron Artest's issues with the NBA, and Kanye West and fellow rappers speaking out against President George W. Bush for his administration's failure to respond quickly to the Hurricane Katrina victims, as well as the opinion of Bush not caring about the minority community.
3	October 18, 2006
The battle of the title "Queen of Southern Rap", between Trina, Jacki-O, and Khia. Jacki-O also has a beef with rap veteran Foxy Brown, which resulted in a physical altercation. Plus, reggaeton superstars Tego Calderón and Calle 13 go after Sean "Diddy" Combs, and the history of rap feuds in the Detroit area, which includes a tribute to late D12 member DeShaun "Proof" Holton.
4	October 25, 2006
Synopsis not yet available
5	November 1, 2006
In 2004, tensions between Jay-Z and R&B superstar R. Kelly during their "Best of Both Worlds" tour and their corresponding album, which led to lawsuits between two, resulting in multimillion-dollar losses. Also, Oprah Winfrey's crusade against gangsta rap music and its artists, including an on-air confrontation with Ludacris on her talk show, regarding his lyrical content. Also featured, Dave Chappelle's now-legendary exit from his Comedy Central hit series and the events surrounding his departure.
6	TBA
Synopsis not yet available

== See also ==
- Beef
- Beef II
