= Beef II =

- Directed by: Peter Spirer
- Written by: Peter Alton; Peter Spirer
- Produced by: Peter Spirer; Denis Hennelly; Casey Suchan
- Narrated by: Keith David
- Cinematography: Sean Adair; Jeff Bollman; Dean Raimondo
- Edited by: Peter Alton
- Music by: J-Force; Quincy Jones III
- Distributed by: Image Entertainment
- Release date: August 30, 2004
- Running time: 140 minutes
- Country: United States
- Language: English

Beef II is a 2004 American documentary film and the sequel to the 2003 documentary Beef, which continued to document the history of rivalries in hip-hop and rap music. Like its prequel, the film was executive produced by Quincy Jones III (QD3), written by Peter Alton and Peter Spirer (who also directed), and was this time narrated by actor Keith David.

Beef II shows a chronological look of battles (some friendly, but many personal), dating back to rap music's infancy in the early 1980s. Among the rivalries that were profiled, they include

- KRS-One vs. Nelly
- Roxanne Shante and Marley Marl vs. U.T.F.O. (see The Roxanne Wars)
- LL Cool J vs. Canibus
- K-Solo vs. DMX
- Cypress Hill vs. Ice Cube & Westside Connection
- D12 (minus Eminem) vs. one-time Detroit cross-town ally Royce da 5'9"
- EPMD partners Erick Sermon vs. Parrish Smith
- Eminem vs. Benzino.

Once again, similar to the first film, Russell Simmons, Snoop Dogg, Kool Moe Dee, Jay-Z, KRS-One, Mack 10, DMX, Big Daddy Kane, Redman, Method Man and Ice-T participated in the film through interviews (new interviews for the film itself), as well as archived interviews from footage of other sources.

Beef II also features never-before seen performances of many of the film's participants, plus extended portions of interviews that did not make the final cut of the film. One portion of the extra interviews features Grandmaster Caz discussing his animosity towards Big Bank Hank from the rap group The Sugar Hill Gang for him using Caz's rhymes for the hit song "Rapper's Delight" and then not being properly compensated. Other portions include Violent J from the rap group Insane Clown Posse discussing the birth of the beef between his group and superstar rapper Eminem and KRS-One talking about the incident that occurred between him and the rapper Prince Be from the group P.M. Dawn and include a segment of the well-publicized rivalry with record labels G-Unit/Shady/Aftermath artists 50 Cent, G-Unit, Dr. Dre, Eminem, D12, Obie Trice and XXL magazine squaring off against Ja Rule, Irv Gotti, Murder Inc. Records, Benzino and The Source magazine in an all out battle royal. A bonus disc included with the Beef II DVD contains the uncut interview of D12 and their beef with rapper Royce da 5'9".

== Production information ==
- Narrator: Keith David
- Writers: Peter Alton, Peter Spirer
- Producers: Casey Suchan, Peter Spirer
- Executive Producer: Quincy D. Jones III (QD3)
- Director: Peter Spirer
- Studios/Distribution Companies: Image Entertainment, QD3 Entertainment, Open Road Films, Aslan Productions
- Release Date: August 30, 2004
- MPAA Rating: R for pervasive language, some drug content and sexual references.
- Running Time: 2 hours, 20 minutes

== See also ==
- Beef
- Beef: The Series
