= Whateva Man =

Single by Redman

from the album Muddy Waters
- Released: January 28, 1997
- Recorded: 1996
- Studio: Mirror Image Recordings (Dix Hills, NY)
- Genre: East Coast hip hop; alternative hip hop
- Length: 3:08
- Label: Def Jam
- Songwriters: Reggie Noble; Erick Sermon
- Producer: Erick Sermon

Redman singles chronology
"It's Like That (My Big Brother)" (1996)	"Whateva Man" (1997)	"Pick It Up" (1997)

Music video
- "Whateva Man" on YouTube

"Whateva Man" is the second single released for Redman's third album, Muddy Waters. It is a mellow track produced by and featuring Erick Sermon, although he is not in the video. Method Man and Keith Murray appear in the video, although they are not on the song. It reached number 42 on the Billboard Hot 100 making it the most popular single from Muddy Waters. It was included in the 1997 version of The Source Presents: Hip Hop Hits. A remixed version can be found on Too Short's Nationwide: Independence Day compilation. Pete Rock also contributed a remix for possible inclusion on the single; however, it was relegated to exclusive radio play. The video is a parody of the film The Blues Brothers.

== Single track list ==
=== A-Side ===
1. Whateva Man (radio edit)
2. Whateva Man (LP version)
3. Whateva Man (TV track)

=== B-Side ===
1. Smoke Buddah (LP version)
2. Whateva Man (instrumental)
3. Whateva Man (a cappella)

== Charts ==
=== Weekly charts ===
Chart (1997)	Peak position
US Billboard Hot 100	42
US Hot R&B/Hip-Hop Songs (Billboard)	18
US Hot Rap Songs (Billboard)	3

=== Year-end charts ===
Chart (1997)	Position
US Hot R&B/Hip-Hop Songs (Billboard)	95
