= Christer Lindarw =

Swedish entertainer

- Lindarw in 2026

Background information
- Also known as: Zsa Zsa Shakespeer
- Born: Bert Christer Jonsson; 3 March 1953 (age 73); Eskilstuna. Sweden
- Origin: Sweden
- Genre: Entertainer

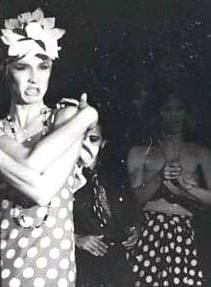
Lindarw debuts in Wild Side Story in 1976

Christer Lindarw (born 3 March 1953) is a Swedish clothes designer, actor, drag queen entertainer, and the leader of drag group After Dark.

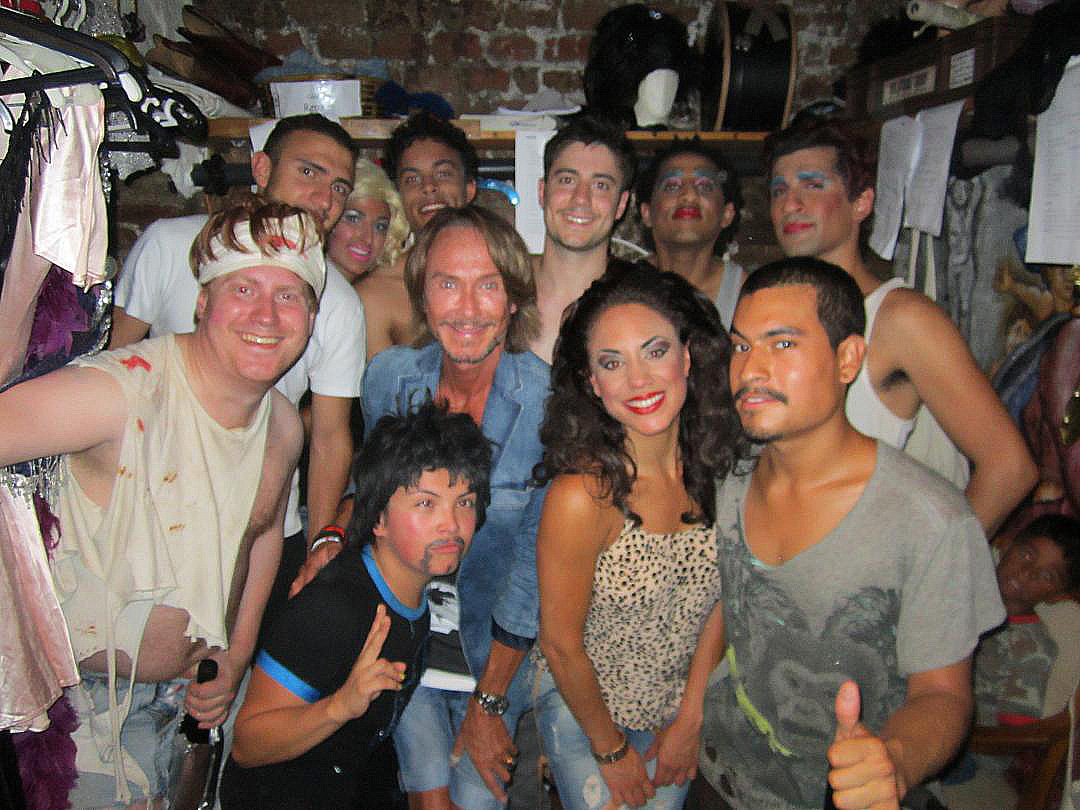
Lindarw (in blue) with the cast backstage after a 40th anniversary performance of Wild Side Story in Stockholm's Old Town in 2013

Lindarw takes seniors' questions in 2026

== Career ==
Lindarw was born in Eskilstuna, Södermanland County. He was educated at Beckmans designhögskola in Stockholm. His 1976 stage debut was as Zsa Zsa Shakespeer for director Lars Jacob in Wild Side Story at Alexandra Charles's club, and he staged his first major production at Hamburger Börs in 1980 together with Roger Jönsson and Lars Flinckman, Lindarw's future co-star of many years from stage shows with their group After Dark. After Dark participated in Melodifestivalen with the song La dolce vita and placed third in the final in Globen.

Lindarws interest in drag showing started after an masquerade where the theme was reversed gender roles. On Jönsson's recommendation he had started to appear in drag in 1976.

Lindarw hosted shows at the nightclub Shazam for a few months and then started the drag show group After Dark and opened his own nightclub with the same name at David Bagares gata in Stockholm. The group had its big breakthrough called Förför Sverige i tiden at Hamburger Börs.

Christer Lindarw also started designing dresses for his friend Lill Lindfors, one being the dress that accidentally "fell off" her during her introduction at the Eurovision Song Contest 1985. He has also created several gala gowns commissioned and worn by Sweden's Crown Princess Victoria.

In 2017, Lindarw performed the surprise finale number, imitating Queen Silvia of Sweden, during the annual televised show in Öland for Crown Princess Victoria's 40th birthday. In the fall of 2016 Bonniers had published a lauded book about his life. Simultaneously, Lindarw began another media-praised show tour around Sweden, with him alone leading his cast; all sold out, it wrapped up a year later at Oscarsteatern in Stockholm, also ending the four decades of successful performances of After Dark.

Outside Sweden Christer Lindarw is known mainly for performances in California and Spain and for clothes he has designed for international celebrities such as Diana Ross.

In 2023, Lindarw was a guest celebrity judge in the episode Drag-a'-mera! of the Swedish language reality television series Drag Race Sverige broadcast on SVT1 and SVT Play.

He was especially honored in May 2025 by Queen Silvia when she made a surprise TV appearance on a nationally broadcast show about his life and career.

In 2026, Lindarw began to appear for the City of Stockholm, replying at senior citizen centers to audience questions about his background and work.

== Family ==
His father was the international motorcycle speedway rider Bert Lindarw.

== Bibliography ==
- Lindarw, Christer; Kellberg, Christina (2016). "This is my life" (in Swedish). [Stockholm]: Bonnier fakta. ISBN 978-91-7424-533-2. SELIBR 19413819.
