= Tell the World My Name =

Studio album by K-Solo
- Released: May 22, 1990
- Recorded: 1989–1990
- Studios: Power Play (New York, NY); Northshore Soundworks (New York, NY)
- Genre: Hip-hop
- Labels: Atlantic; 82108
- Producer: PMD (also exec.)

K-Solo chronology
Tell the World My Name (1990)	Time's Up (1992)

Singles from Tell the World My Name
- 1. "Spellbound" Released: April 26, 1990; 2. "Your Mom's in My Business" Released: September 6, 1990; 3. "Fugitive" Released: February 6, 1991

Tell The World My Name is the debut studio album by American rapper K-Solo. It was released on May 22, 1990, via Atlantic Records. The recording sessions took place at Power Play Studios and Northshore Soundworks in New York City. The album was produced by PMD, who also served as executive producer. It peaked at No. 45 on the Top R&B Albums in the United States.

The album was supported by three singles: "Spellbound", "Your Mom's in My Business" and "Fugitive". The song "Spellbound" was later sampled by R&B group Brownstone for their Grammy-nominated 1994 hit song "If You Love Me".

On April 22, 2023, Tell the World My Name was reissued on yellow colored vinyl by Real Gone Music for Record Store Day.

== Critical reception ==
Professional ratings
Review scores
Source	Rating
AllMusic	3.5/5 stars
Orlando Sentinel	4/5 stars
RapReviews	7.5/10
The Village Voice	(choice cut)

The Orlando Sentinel concluded, "Confident without swaggering, hard without macho posturing, K- Solo's Tell the World My Name deserves notice amid a sea of rap-star wannabes."

== Track listing ==
All lyrics are written by Kevin Madison.

No.	Title	Music	Length
1.	"Spellbound"	Erick Sermon	3:31
2.	"Rockin' for My Hometown"	PMD	3:36
3.	"Everybody Knows Me"	PMD	5:43
4.	"Speed Blocks"	PMD; Peace Core	2:33
5.	"Fugitive"	PMD	4:16
6.	"Tales from the Crack Side"	PMD	6:13
7.	"Your Mom's in My Business"	PMD, Frankie Beverly	5:22
8.	"Real Solo Please Stand Up"	PMD	3:55
9.	"Renee-Renee"	PMD; Al B. Sure!	3:42
10.	"Solo Rocks the House"	PMD	4:04
11.	"The Messenger"	PMD	4:31
12.	"Drums of Death"	PMD	3:55

Traffic Entertainment Group reissue tracks
No.	Title	Length
13.	"Fugitive" (Super Extended Remix)	4:42
14.	"Fugitive" (A Capella)	3:42
15.	"Your Mom's in My Business" (Remix 1)	5:31
16.	"Your Mom's in My Business" (Remix 1 Instrumental)	5:30
17.	"Your Mom's in My Business" (Remix 2)	4:24

== Personnel ==
- Kevin "K-Solo" Madison – lyrics, lead vocals, sleeve notes
- Susan Mahoney – additional vocals
- Thomas Jimenez – additional vocals
- Mel – additional vocals
- Parrish J. "PMD" Smith – keyboards, producer, executive producer
- George "DJ Scratch" Spivey – scratches
- Charlie Marotta – engineering
- Ivan 'Doc' Rodriguez – engineering
- Bob Defrin – art direction
- Larry Freemantle – design
- Robert Manella – photography
