= Time's Up (K-Solo album) =

Studio album by K-Solo
- Released: June 2, 1992
- Recorded: 1991–92
- Genre: Hip hop
- Label: Atlantic; 82388
- Producer: PMD (also exec.); Sam Sneed; Erick Sermon; K-Solo; Pete Rock

K-Solo chronology
Tell the World My Name (1990)	Time's Up (1992)

Singles from Time's Up
- 1. "I Can't Hold It Back" Released: May 28, 1992; 2. "Letterman" Released: October 22, 1992

Professional ratings
Review scores
Source	Rating
AllMusic	3/5 stars

Time's Up is the second and final studio album by American rapper K-Solo. It was released on June 2, 1992, via Atlantic Records. Production was handled by Sam Sneed, EPMD, Pete Rock and K-Solo. The album peaked at number 135 on the Billboard 200, at number 36 on the Top R&B/Hip-Hop Albums and at number 3 on the Heatseekers Albums in the United States.

Tha album spawned two singles: "I Can't Hold It Back" and "Letterman", both were charted on the Hot Rap Songs chart.

== Track listing ==
No.	Title	Producer(s)	Length
1.	"I Can't Hold It Back"	Sam Sneed	4:00
2.	"Letterman"	Pete Rock	3:20
3.	"Long Live the Fugitive"	K-Solo	1:49
4.	"Premonition of a Prisoner"	Sam Sneed	3:32
5.	"Sneak Tip"	Sam Sneed	4:36
6.	"The Baby Doesn't Look Like Me"	Erick Sermon	5:24
7.	"The Formula (House Party)"	PMD	4:26
8.	"Who's Killin' Who?"	Sam Sneed	3:41
9.	"Household Maid"	Sam Sneed	3:41
10.	"Rock Bottom"	Erick Sermon	3:02
11.	"King of the Mountain"	Sam Sneed	3:36

== Charts ==
Chart (1992)	Peak position
US Billboard 200	135
US Top R&B/Hip-Hop Albums (Billboard)	36
US Heatseekers Albums (Billboard)	3
