= Mudface (Redman album) =

Studio album by Redman
- Released: November 13, 2015
- Recorded: 2015
- Studio: Gilla House
- Genre: Hip-hop
- Length: 34:13
- Label: Gilla House
- Producer: Redman (also exec.); Boris Milanov; Desmond "Dez" Peterson; Illmind; Jahlil Beats; Labor Department; Marvel; Mike & Keys; Rick Rock; Rockwilder; Sebastian Arman; Theory Hazit

Redman chronology
Reggie (2010)	Mudface (2015)	Muddy Waters Too (2024)

Professional ratings
Review scores
Source	Rating
HipHopDX	3/5
laut.de	3/5 stars
RapReviews	7.5/10

Mudface is the eighth studio album by American rapper Redman. It was released on November 13, 2015, through Gilla House Records. The recording sessions took place at Gilla House Studios. The album was produced by Boris Milanov, Desmond "Dez" Peterson, Illmind, Jahlil Beats, Labor Department, Marvel, Mike & Keys, Rick Rock, Rockwilder, Sebastian Arman, Theory Hazit, and Redman. It features guest appearances from Ready Roc, Runt Dog, Stressmatic, and Josh Gannet. The album peaked at number 147 on the Billboard 200 and number 13 on the Top R&B/Hip-Hop Albums in the United States.

== Track listing ==
No.	Title	Writer(s)	Producer(s)	Length
1.	"Dr. Trevis (Intro)" (featuring Josh Gannet)	Reginald Noble	Redman	0:50
2.	"Wus Really Hood"	Noble; Dana Stinson	Rockwilder	1:27
3.	"Beastin' (MCA)"	Noble; Frederick Jay Rubin; Adam Keefe Horovitz; Adam Nathaniel Yauch; Michael Louis Diamond	Redman	2:32
4.	"Gettin' Inside"	Noble; Francisco Ortiz; Sharrod Moore	Labor Department	3:19
5.	"Muddy Island (Skit)"	Noble	Redman	0:58
6.	"Nigga Like Me"	Noble; Michael Ray Cox; John Wesley Groover; Donald Willis Drummond; Clement Seymour Dodd	Mike & Keys	2:28
7.	"Dopeman" (featuring Stressmatic)	Noble; Thomas Jackson; Ricardo Thomas	Rick Rock	2:37
8.	"Let It Go"	Noble; Orlando Jahlil Tucker	Jahlil Beats	3:18
9.	"Bars"	Noble; Thearthur Readié Washington	Theory Hazit	3:15
10.	"High 2 Come Down"	Noble; Sebastian Arman; Boris Milanov	Sebastian Arman; Boris Milanov	3:28
11.	"Won't Be Fiendin (The Dez Remix)"	Noble; Desmond Peterson; Eldra Patrick DeBarge	Desmond "Dez" Peterson	3:44
12.	"Undeniable" (featuring Runt Dog and Ready Roc)	Noble; Armon Johnson; Shariff Williams; Ramon Ibanga, Jr.	Illmind	3:16
13.	"Go Hard"	Noble	Marvel	3:01
Total length:				34:13

== Personnel ==
- Reginald "Reggie" Noble – main artist, producer (tracks: 1, 3, 5), engineering, executive producer, A&R
- Josh Gannet – featured artist (track 1), mixing, mastering
- Thomas "Stressmatic" Jackson – featured artist (track 7)
- Armon "Ready Roc" Johnson – featured artist (track 12)
- Runt Dawg – featured artist (track 12)
- Dana "Rockwilder" Stinson – producer (track 2)
- Labor Department – producer (track 4)
- Michael Ray Cox Jr. – producer (track 6)
- John "J-Keys" Groover – producer (track 6)
- Ricardo "Rick Rock" Thomas – producer (track 7)
- Orlando "Jahlil Beats" Tucker – producer (track 8)
- Thearthur "Theory Hazit" Washington – producer (track 9)
- Boris Milanov – producer (track 10)
- Sebastian Arman – producer (track 10)
- Desmond J. Peterson – producer (track 11)
- Ramon "Illmind" Ibanga Jr. – producer (track 12)
- Marvel Da Beat Bandit – producer (track 13)
- Dom Dirtee – artwork, design
- Tariq Zaid – A&R
- DMG Music Clearances – sample clearance

== Charts ==
Chart (2015)	Peak position
US Billboard 200	147
US Independent Albums (Billboard)	10
US Top R&B/Hip-Hop Albums (Billboard)	13
US Top Rap Albums (Billboard)	9
