= Muddy Waters Too =

Studio album by Redman
- Released: December 24, 2024
- Genre: Hip-hop
- Length: 81:06
- Labels: Gilla House; Riveting
- Producers: Chris Pinset; Erick Sermon; Khrysis; Mike & Keys; Reggie Noble; Rick Rock; Rockwilder; DJ Static; King Benny; Seige Monstacity; Tall Black Guy; Teak; Theory Hazit; Vinyl Frontiers

Redman chronology
Mudface (2015)	Muddy Waters Too (2024)

Singles from Muddy Waters Too
- 1. "Don't Wanna C Me Rich" Released: November 26, 2024; 2. "Jersey" Released: December 10, 2024; 3. "Im On Dat Bullshit" Released: December 27, 2024; 4. "Booyaka Shot" Released: January 15, 2025

Muddy Waters Too is the ninth studio album by American rapper Redman. It was released on December 24, 2024, by Redman's own label Gilla House and Riveting Music. It features guest appearances by Affion Crockett, Artifacts, Channel Live, Faith Evans, Heather B. Gardner, Ke Turner, Kid Capri, KRS-One, Lady Luck, Lords of the Underground, Melanie Rutherford, Method Man, Mr. Cream, Naughty by Nature, Nikki D, Oran "Juice" Jones, Queen Latifah, Rah Digga, Runt Dawg, Sheek Louch, and Snoop Dogg. The album was produced by Erick Sermon, Khrysis, Mike & Keys, Rick Rock, Rockwilder, and Redman, among others. It is his first studio album since Mudface (2015) and serves as a sequel to his third studio album, Muddy Waters (1996).

== Background ==
On November 4, 2010, Redman announced he was working on a sequel to Muddy Waters for a Summer 2011 release.

On June 9, 2013, he announced via Twitter that the album would be released in Fall 2013.

On March 5, 2018, he announced on social medias that Muddy Waters Too would be coming soon.

On April 16, 2021, several days before a Verzuz battle against longtime collaborator Method Man, Redman explained some difficulties he had concerning the album release, including COVID-19 pandemic.

Throughout 2018 and into 2019, he released various singles, including I Love Hip Hop, Ya!, 1990 Now, Tear It Up, Trap House and Black Man In America.

Throughout 2021 and 2022, he released several other singles scheduled to be released on the album, including 80 Barz, So Cool and Jane. The cover art for “So Cool” showed Red sat next to the famous sunflower in a jar from the original Muddy Waters cover art, which further increased anticipation for the album at the time.

In November 2024, the rollout for Muddy Waters Too was revived once again, with Redman releasing the new and definitive lead single Don't Wanna C Me Rich on November 26, 2024. Just two weeks later, the album’s second single Jersey was released on December 10, 2024. The full album was finally released another two weeks later on Christmas Eve.

Mixing engineers

- Josh Gannet
- Troy Hightower

== Track listing ==
Muddy Waters Too track listing
No.	Title	Writer(s)	Producer(s)	Length
1.	"MW2 Welcome"	Reggie Noble	Reggie Noble	0:02
2.	"Da Fuck Goin On"	Noble	Reggie Noble	1:17
3.	"Whuts Hot" (with Oran "Juice" Jones)	Noble; Oran Edward Jones II; Christopher Frederick Tyson; Brian Holland; Lamont Dozier	Khrysis; Reggie Noble	2:19
4.	"Jersey"	Noble; Dana Stinson	Rockwilder	2:43
5.	"Fat Shirley" (Skit)	Noble	Reggie Noble	0:28
6.	"Lalala" (with Method Man)	Noble; Clifford Smith, Jr.; Thijs Vermeulen; Delfo Gabriele Pinto	Vinyl Frontiers; Reggie Noble	3:18
7.	"Dont U Miss"	Noble; Erick Sermon; Thomas Brenneck; David Anthony Guy; Leon Marcus Michels	Erick Sermon	3:06
8.	"Ignant"	Noble; Thearthur Readié Washington; Johnnie Frierson; Mary Frierson	Theory Hazit	2:01
9.	"Uncle Quilly"	Noble	Reggie Noble	0:49
10.	"Aye"	Noble; Terrel Wallace	Tall Black Guy	2:42
11.	"Hoodstar" (with Faith Evans and Kid Capri)	Noble; Faith Renée Evans; David Anthony Love Jr.; Stinson; Al Hudson; Kevin McCord	Rockwilder	3:30
12.	"Dont Wanna C Me Rich"	Noble	Reggie Noble; Dez the Producer	2:17
13.	"Im on dat Bullshit"	Noble; Teak Underdue	Teak Underdue	3:31
14.	"Da Trunk" (Skit)	Noble	Reggie Noble	0:41
15.	"Pop da Trunk"	Noble; Stinson	Rockwilder	2:49
16.	"Gheddo Motivation" (with Oran "Juice" Jones)	Noble; Jones II; Christopher Pinset	Reggie Noble; Chris Pinset	4:09
17.	"Dynomite" (with Sheek Louch)	Noble; Sean Divine Jacobs; Richard Evans; Linda Williams	Reggie Noble	3:13
18.	"Wave"	Noble; Stinson	Rockwilder	1:27
19.	"My Weed's Been Taken" (Skit)	Noble	Reggie Noble	1:20
20.	"Kush" (with Snoop Dogg)	Noble; Calvin Cordozar Broadus Jr.; Stinson	Rockwilder	5:01
21.	"Booyaka Shot"	Noble; Washington; Lawrence Parker	Reggie Noble; Theory Hazit	3:48
22.	"Goofy" (with Ke Turner)	Noble; Ke Turner; Michael Ray Cox, Jr.	Mike & Keys	3:24
23.	"Obama Stick Up" (with Affion Crockett)	Noble	Reggie Noble	1:50
24.	"1 O' Clock"	Noble; Stinson	Rockwilder	2:51
25.	"Lite It Up" (with Naughty by Nature and Queen Latifah featuring Rah Digga, Shaquille O'Neal, Lords of the Underground, Lady Luck, Artifacts, Heather B., Channel Live and Nikki D)	Noble; Anthony Shawn Criss; Vincent Brown; Dana Elaine Owens; Rashia Tashan Fisher; Shaquille Rashaun O'Neal; Dupré Kelly; Al'Terik Wardrick; Shanell Ayana Jones; William Williams; Heather B. Gardner; Hakim Green; Nichelle Dayveena Strong; Bernard Edwards; Nile Gregory Rodgers Jr.	Reggie Noble	5:13
26.	"Wudeytauknbout"	Noble; Stinson	Rockwilder	2:33
27.	"Why U Mad" (with Mr. Cream and Runt Dawg)	Noble; Ricardo Thomas; Tamar Wertz; Shariff Williams	Rick Rock	3:42
28.	"Soopaman Luva 7" (Skit)	Noble	Reggie Noble	1:30
29.	"Soopaman Luva 7" (with Melanie Rutherford)	Noble; Melanie Rutherford; Stinson; Donald Blackman	Reggie Noble; Rockwilder	3:01
30.	"Soopaman Luva 7 Continue"	Noble; Washington	Theory Hazit	1:40
31.	"Looka Here" (with KRS-One)	Noble; Lawrence Parker	Reggie Noble	2:13
32.	"Smoke wit Me"	Noble; Anthony Gyesi; Marcus White	DJ Static; Seige Monstacity	2:22
Total length:				81:06

Leftover tracks

- "1990 Now"
- "Black Man in America" (feat. Pressure)
- "Tear It Up"
- "Ya!"
- "Trap House" (feat. Kazzie)
- "I Love Hip Hop"
- "80 Barz"
- "So Cool"
- "Jane"
