= Beef (2003 film) =

- Directed by: Peter Spirer
- Written by: Peter Alton; Peter Spirer
- Produced by: Denis Hennelly; Casey Suchan and Peter Spirer
- Narrated by: Ving Rhames
- Cinematography: Sean Adair; Peter Alton; Jeff Bollman; Dean Raimondo
- Edited by: Peter Alton
- Music by: J-Force; Quincy Jones III; Femi Ojetunde
- Distributed by: Image Entertainment
- Release date: August 2003
- Running time: 103 minutes 184 minutes (Extended)
- Country: United States
- Language: English

Beef is a 2003 American documentary film directed by Peter Spirer about the history of hip-hop feuds. Produced by Peter Spirer, Casey Suchan, and Denis Henry Hennelly and executive produced by Quincy Jones III (QD3), the film was written by Peter Alton and Spirer and narrated by actor Ving Rhames.

== Content ==
Beef takes a chronological look at battles (some friendly, but many personal) dating back to rap music's infancy in the early 1980s. The notable rivalries discussed include KRS-One vs. MC Shan, Kool Moe Dee vs. Busy Bee, 50 Cent vs. Ja Rule, Tru Life vs. Mobb Deep, Common vs. Ice Cube & Westside Connection, the break-up of legendary group N.W.A, which includes Ice Cube's abrupt departure, and the later animosity between Dr. Dre and Eazy-E, the highly publicized Jay-Z vs. Nas rivalry and the most infamous feud of all, 2Pac vs. The Notorious B.I.G. It was partly born out of producer Jones's belief that "Beefs are killing hip-hop".

Many prominent hip-hop personalities such as Russell Simmons, Snoop Dogg, Kool Moe Dee, Jay-Z, KRS-One, Mack 10, DMX and Ice-T also participate through interviews (some produced for the film, as well as archived interviews from other sources, such as MTV and BET clips). Beef also features newly released performances by many musical artists.

The film also contains never-before-seen performances by many of the participants and many others, plus extended portions of interviews that did not make final cut. One portion of the extended interviews features part of an interview with Nate Dogg discussing an incident from around 1995 at a Dogg Pound video shoot, where entourage members from Ruthless Records arrived and started a big brawl with members of then-rival Death Row Records. Although he did not mention them by name (he however subtlety mentioned the duo's less-than-successful 1995 album Real Brothaz), rappers B.G. Knocc Out and Dresta (who participated in Eazy-E's hit diss recording, Real Muthaphuckkin G's) were among the alleged participants in the fight.

== Critical reaction ==
The Los Angeles Times called it "engrossing" and "a moving lament for the way hip-hop once was".

Complex rated it number 10 in its 25 best hiphop documentaries, calling it a "classic hip hop doc".

== Soundtrack ==
Music From And Inspired By The Film Beef: The Soundtrack

Soundtrack album by various artists
- Released: October 7, 2003
- Genre: Rap
- Length: 1:16:42
- Labels: Strange Music; MSC Entertainment
- Producers: Mark Cerami (exec.); Quincy Jones III (exec.); Travis O'Guin (exec.); Alchemist; A. Parker; Briss; DJ Silk; DJ Yella; Dr. Dre; Ice Cube; Jim Bean; Krizz Kaliko; Madness 4 Real; Paul Pistachio; Rhythm D; Sean Raspberry; Shannibal Lector; Sir Jinx; Tekneko Bros.

Singles from Beef: The Soundtrack
- 1. "Let's Go" Released: 2003

Professional ratings
Review scores
| Source | Rating |
|---|---|
| AllMusic | 2.5/5 stars |

| No. | Title | Producer(s) | Length |
|---|---|---|---|
| 1. | "No Vaseline" (performed by Ice Cube) | Ice Cube; Sir Jinx | 5:09 |
| 2. | "Beef" (performed by Tech N9ne and Krizz Kaliko) | Tekneko Bros. | 5:01 |
| 3. | "You Don't Really Want It" (performed by KRS-One) | Jim Bean | 3:31 |
| 4. | "Westside Slaughterhouse" (performed by Westside Connection) | Madness 4 Real | 4:57 |
| 5. | "Murder by #'s" (performed by Skatterman & Snug Brim and Ricky Scarfo) | Sean Raspberry; Krizz Kaliko | 4:20 |
| 6. | "Drama" (performed by Prodigy and Twin Gambino) | Alchemist | 4:15 |
| 7. | "Real Muthaphuckkin G's" (performed by Eazy-E, B.G. Knocc Out and Dresta) | Rhythm D | 5:32 |
| 8. | "Caution" (performed by Black Child) | A. Parker | 4:35 |
| 9. | "When the Rain Drops" (performed by Kutt Calhoun and Snug Brim) | Sean Raspberry | 5:57 |
| 10. | "That's It" (performed by KRS-One and Mad Lion) | Jim Bean | 3:37 |
| 11. | "Postman" (performed by Poverty) | Briss | 3:35 |
| 12. | "Now I See" (performed by MC Shan) | Shannibal Lector | 4:27 |
| 13. | "Snake Ya" (performed by Tech N9ne and Krizz Kaliko) | Tekneko Bros. | 3:53 |
| 14. | "Let's Go (It's a Movement)" (performed by Warren G, KRS-One and Lil' Al) | Wron G | 4:12 |
| 15. | "Witness Protection" (performed by Jayo Felony) | DJ Silk | 3:56 |
| 16. | "Day I Die" (performed by Tru Life) | Paul Pistachio | 4:01 |
| 17. | "Fuck tha Police" (performed by N.W.A) | Dr. Dre; DJ Yella | 5:44 |
| Total length: | | | 1:16:42 |

== Legacy ==
Subsequent releases in this series include Beef II (2004, also produced by Suchan and Hennelly, and narrated by actor Keith David), Beef 3 (2005, narrated by DJ Kay Slay) and a BET series titled Beef: The Series, which premiered in 2006. These sequels are a continuation of the original film, but cover lesser-known confrontations and developing beefs just prior to the release of each respective installment. They include LL Cool J vs. Canibus, Ja Rule vs. DMX, 50 Cent vs. The Game, Lil' Flip vs. T.I., Nelly vs. Chingy, and Erick Sermon vs. EPMD partner Parrish Smith. In 2011, Spirer speculated on the possibility of a fourth film, suggesting he was a little tired of the "he said/she said" drama but he might produce further specials in future.

Beef 4 was released in 2007. Charlie Murphy narrated the fourth film of the series, replacing Keith David.

== See also ==
- Beef II
- Beef: The Series
