= Alexandra Charles =

Swedish former nightclub owner

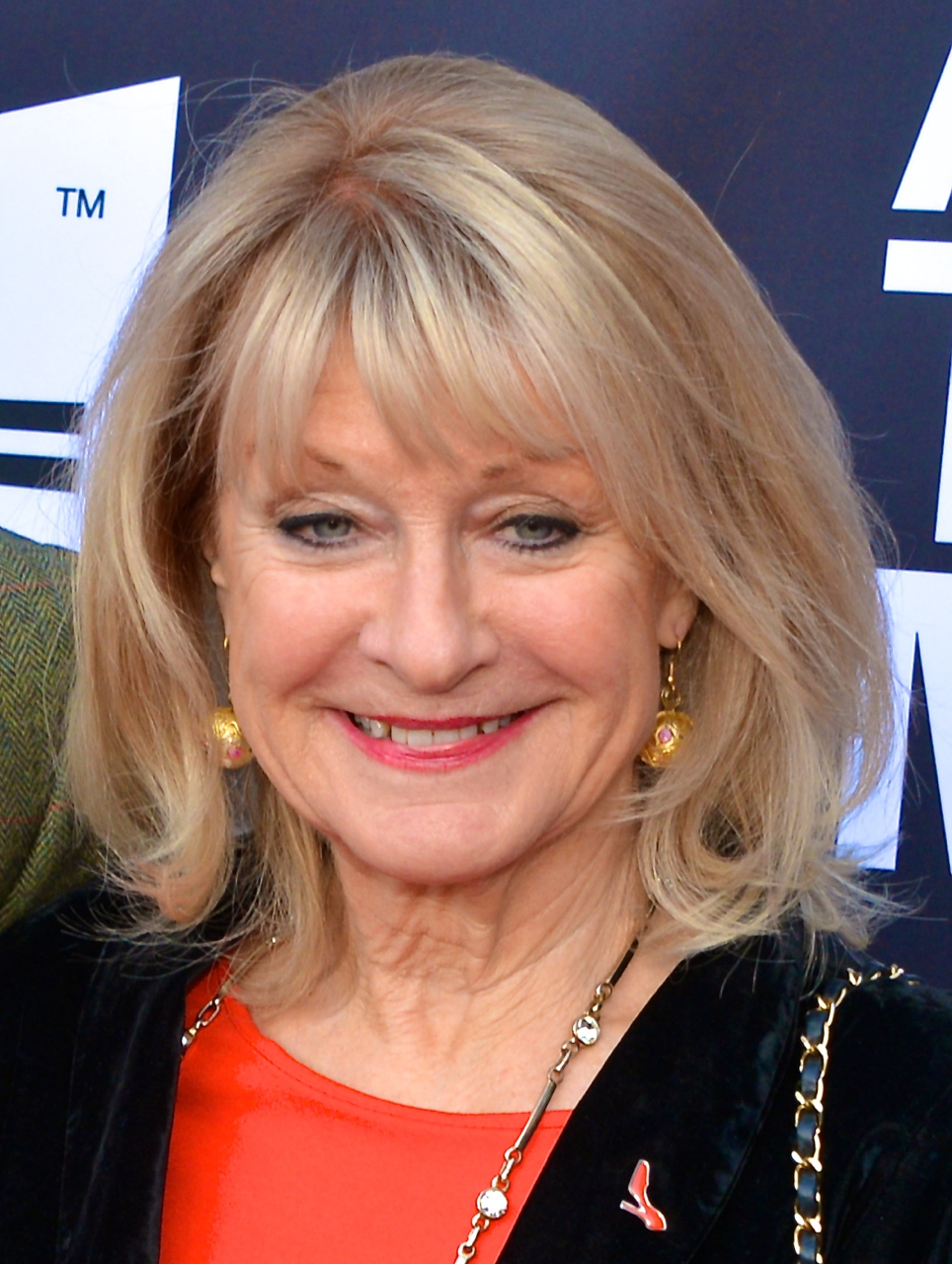
- Charles in May 2013
- Born: Thyra Margareta Inga-Lill Gefvert; 12 November 1946 (age 79); Mariestad, Sweden
- Spouse: Noël Charles
- Awards: Awarded a medal by king Carl XVI Gustaf for her work for women's health

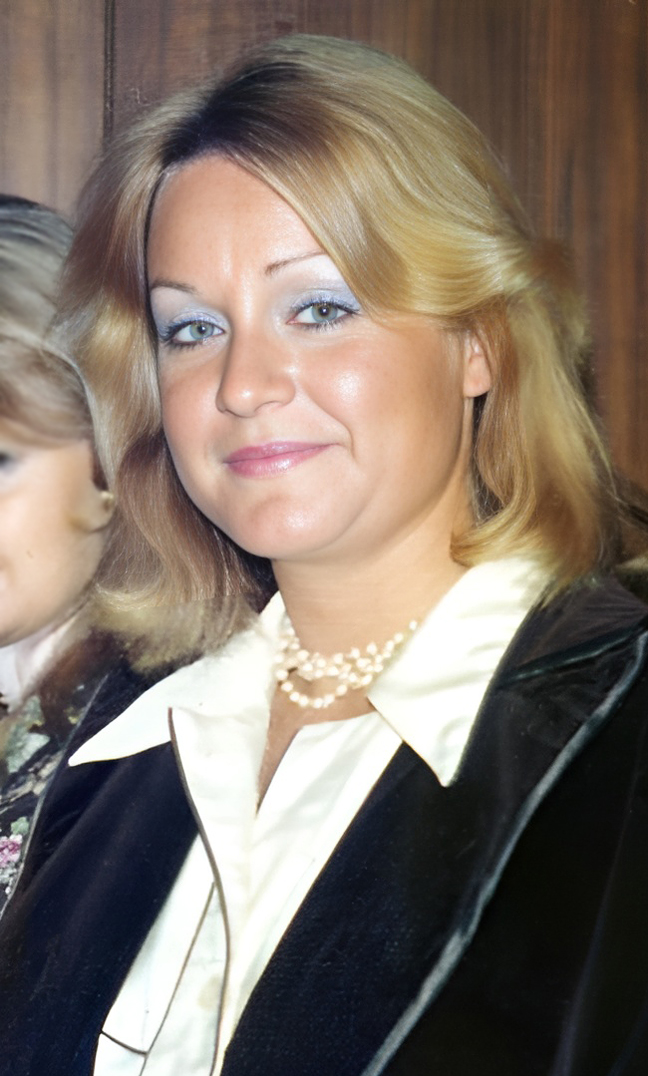
Charles in 1974

Alexandra Charles (née Thyra Margareta Inga-Lill Gefvert; born 12 November 1946) is a Swedish former nightclub owner. Together with her first husband Noël Charles (1940–2013), she opened a membership restaurant-discothèque called Alexandra's in central Stockholm in 1968 which existed in four successive central locations in that city until 1988. They also initially had a club by the same name in his native Barbados.

The clientele of the Stockholm club included Swedish celebrities and royalty, with regulars including ABBA, Björn Borg and King Carl XVI Gustaf. Many international celebrities who visited Stockholm were also visitors to Charles's nightclub.

Alexandra Charles was born in Mariestad, Sweden. In 1976, after her divorce from Noël Charles, she split up with her American business partner Tom Macksey, and her business was moved and renamed Alexandra. A number of Swedish entertainers made their debuts at Alexandra's.

Charles has been married twice more but still goes by the surname of her first husband (who later married John Lennon's ex-wife Cynthia Lennon). She chairs the charitable foundations 1.6 Million Club and 2.6 Million Club. In 2015 she was awarded a medal by king Carl XVI Gustaf for her work for women's health.

On 7 July 2004, she was one of the hosts of Sommar i P1 on Sveriges Radio.
