= Beverley Knight discography =

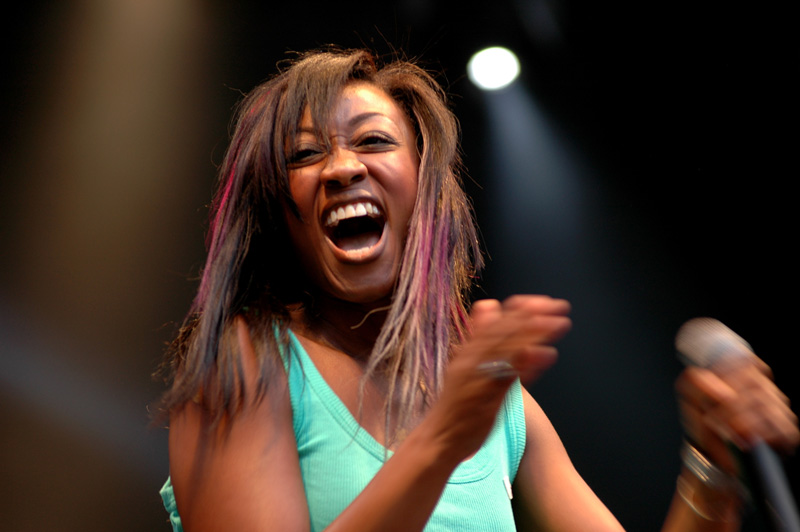
- Beverley Knight at Marktrock 2005, in Leuven, Flemish Brabant, Belgium
- Studio albums: 9
- Extended plays: 1
- Compilation albums: 3
- Singles: 29
- Music videos: 26
- Other album appearances: 15

This discography is a comprehensive listing of official releases by British soul singer Beverley Knight. It consists of nine studio albums, three compilation albums (two greatest hits albums and one remix album) and one EP. Knight has also released twenty-nine solo singles (excluding re-releases) and twenty-six solo music videos. She has also collaborated on at least fifteen other projects.

== Albums ==
=== Studio albums ===
Title	Album details	Peak chart positions			Certifications (sales thresholds)
Title	Album details	UK	UK R&B	SCO	Certifications (sales thresholds)
The B-Funk	Released: 26 November 1995; Label: Dome; Formats: CD, cassette	145	20	—	
Prodigal Sista	Released: 17 August 1998; Label: Parlophone; Formats: CD, cassette	42	6	—	BPI: Gold
Who I Am	Released: 11 March 2002; Label: Parlophone; Formats: CD, cassette, digital download	7	1	17	BPI: Gold
Affirmation	Released: 28 June 2004; Label: Parlophone; Formats: CD, digital download	11	11	15	BPI: Gold
Music City Soul	Released: 7 May 2007; Label: Parlophone; Formats: CD, digital download	8	3	11	BPI: Silver
100%	Released: 7 September 2009; Label: Hurricane; Formats: CD, digital download	17	2	29	
Soul UK	Released: 4 July 2011; Label: Hurricane; Formats: CD, digital download	13	2	27	
Soulsville	Released: 10 June 2016; Label: East West Records; Formats: CD, vinyl, digital download	9	3	10	
The Fifth Chapter	Released: 29 September 2023; Label: Tag8 Music, BMG Rights Management; Formats: CD, vinyl, digital download, streaming	39	—	24	

=== Collaborative albums ===
Title	Album details	Peak chart positions
Title	Album details	UK
Songs from the Stage (with Amber Riley and Cassidy Janson as Leading Ladies)	Released: 17 November 2017; Label: Rhino Entertainment; Format: CD, digital download	19

=== Compilation albums ===
Title	Album details	Peak chart positions				Sales	Certifications (sales thresholds)
Title	Album details	UK	UK R&B	SCO	EU	Sales	Certifications (sales thresholds)
Voice – The Best of Beverley Knight	Released: 20 March 2006; Label: Parlophone; Formats: CD, digital download	9	3	13	38	UK: 326,580	BPI: Platinum
The Collection	Released: 20 July 2009; Label: Parlophone; Formats: CD, digital download	—	—	—	—		
The Collection 1995–2007	Released: 16 July 2012; Label: Demon Music Group; Formats: CD, digital download	—	—	—	—		

=== Live albums ===
Title	Album details	Peak chart positions	
Title	Album details	UK	SCO
Live... At Cornbury Music Festival 2013	Released: 23 September 2013; Label: Hurricane Records; Formats: CD, digital download	—	—
BK25 (with the Leo Green Orchestra)	Released: 8 November 2019; Label: Rhino Entertainment; Format: CD, digital download	71	43

=== Remix albums ===
Title	Album details
100% – The Remixes	Released: 29 January 2012; Label: Hurricane; Formats: Digital download
Soul UK – The Remixes	Released: 29 January 2012; Label: Hurricane; Format: Digital download

=== Soundtrack albums ===
Title	Album details
Memphis: The Musical – Original London Cast Recording	Released: 9 February 2015; Label: First Night; Formats: CD, digital download
The Drifters Girl: World Premiere Cast (Recorded at Abbey Road Studios)	Released: 22 May 2022; Label: Tag8 Music, BMG Rights Management; Format: CD, Digital download, streaming

== Extended plays ==
Title	EP details
Love Soul: Soul UK Live EP	Released: 12 February 2012; Label: Hurricane; Format: Digital download, streaming
Revisited	Released: 21 April 2023; Label: Tag8 Music, BMG Rights Management; Format: Digital download, streaming

== Singles ==
Title	Year	Peak chart positions				Certifications (sales thresholds)	Album
Title	Year	UK	UK R&B	FRA	GER	Certifications (sales thresholds)	Album
"Flavour of the Old School"	1995	33	5	40	—		The B-Funk
"Down for the One"	1995	55	8	—	—		The B-Funk
"Moving on Up (On the Right Side)"	1996	43	9	—	—		The B-Funk
"Mutual Feeling"	1996	124	19	—	—		The B-Funk
"Cast All Your Cares"	1997	—	—	—	—		The B-Funk
"Made It Back" (featuring Redman)	1998	21	4	—	—		Prodigal Sista
"Rewind (Find a Way)"	1998	40	14	—	—		Prodigal Sista
"Made It Back 99" (featuring Redman)	1999	19	5	34	—		Prodigal Sista
"Greatest Day"	1999	14	4	—	—		Prodigal Sista
"Sista Sista"	1999	31	5	46	—		Prodigal Sista
"Get Up!"	2001	17	7	72	—		Who I Am
"Shoulda Woulda Coulda"	2002	10	1	—	—	BPI: Silver	Who I Am
"Gold"	2002	27	6	—	—		Who I Am
"Whatever's Clever"	2002	—	—	—	—		Who I Am
"Shape of You (Reshaped)" (featuring Hollywood)	2003	Ineligible for charts					Who I Am
"Come as You Are"	2004	9	7	—	100		Affirmation
"Not Too Late for Love"	2004	31	10	—	—		Affirmation
"Keep This Fire Burning"	2005	16	4	—	94		Affirmation
"Piece of My Heart"	2006	16	8	—	—		Voice – The Best of Beverley Knight
"No Man's Land"	2007	43	7	—	—		Music City Soul
"After You"	2007	131	8	—	—		Music City Soul
"The Queen of Starting Over"	2007	—	—	—	—		Music City Soul
"Every Step"	2009	Ineligible for charts					100%
"Beautiful Night"	2009	96	28	—	—		100%
"In Your Shoes" (featuring Chipmunk)	2009	— (Note: "In Your Shoes" did not enter the UK Singles Chart, but debuted and peaked at number 36 on the UK Independent Singles Chart.)	—	—	—		100%
"Soul Survivor" (with Chaka Khan)	2010	183	—	—	—		100%
"Mama Used to Say"	2011	—	—	—	—		Soul UK
"Cuddly Toy"	2011	—	—	—	—		Soul UK
"One More Try"	2011	—	—	—	—		Soul UK
"Round and Around"	2012	—	—	—	—		Soul UK
"I Found Out" (with Bimbo Jones)	2014	—	—	—	—		Non-album single
"Middle of Love"	2016	—	—	—	—		Soulsville
"Private Number" (with Jamie Cullum)	2016	—	—	—	—		Soulsville
"I Can't Stand the Rain"	2016	—	—	—	—		Soulsville
"Marvellous Party"	2017	—	—	—	—		The Halycon: Original Music from the Television Series
"Now or Never"	2019	—	—	—	—		BK25: Beverley Knight with the Leo Green Orchestra - Live at the Royal Festival Hall
"A Christmas Wish"	2020	— (Note: "A Christmas Wish" did not enter the UK Singles Chart, but peaked at number 28 on the UK Singles Downloads Chart, and at number 30 on the UK Singles Sales Chart.)	—	—	—		The Loss Adjuster OST
"Everything's Gonna Be Alright" (with Mark Knight featuring London Community Gospel Choir)	2021	—	—	—	—		The Fifth Chapter
"Last One on My Mind"	2023	—	—	—	—		The Fifth Chapter
"I Wanna Be Your Lover" (with Mark Knight and Sgt Slick)	2023	—	—	—	—		Non-album single
"Systematic Overload"	2023	— (Note: "Systematic Overload" did not enter the UK Singles Chart, but debuted and peaked at number 61 on the UK Singles Downloads Chart and at number 64 on the UK Singles Sales Chart.)	—	—	—		The Fifth Chapter
"I'm On Fire" (featuring London Community Gospel Choir)	2023	—	—	—	—		The Fifth Chapter
"Not Prepared for You"	2024	—	—	—	—		The Fifth Chapter
"Never Say Never" (with Billy Porter)	2025	—	—	—	—		Non-album single

== Collaborations ==
Artist	Year	Title	Comments
MOBO Allstars	1998	"Ain't No Stopping Us Now"	Charity single released collectively by MOBO Award nominees in 1998, reaching No. 47 in the UK singles chart. Other artists include Mica Paris, The Honeyz and Another Level.
Courtney Pine & Beverley Knight	2000	"Hard Times"	The album track features vocals from Knight and music by Pine. Taken from the album Back in the Day.
Jamiroquai featuring Beverley Knight	2001	"Main Vein"	Album track taken from the album A Funk Odyssey.
Jamiroquai featuring Beverley Knight	2001	"Love Foolosophy"	Knight provides backing vocals on this single taken from A Funk Odyssey.
Jools Holland & Beverley Knight	2002	"A Change Is Gonna Come"	A cover of the Sam Cooke classic, the song features vocals from Knight and music from Jools Holland's Rhythm and Blues Orchestra. Taken from the album Small World Big Band Volume II.
Sinclair & Beverley Knight	2002	"Maybe Love"	A duet with the French singer, taken from the soundtrack to Mon Idole.
Sinclair & Beverley Knight	2002	"First Time For You"	A duet with the French singer, taken from the soundtrack to Mon Idole.
Beverley Knight	2003	"Love's in Need of Love Today"	A cover of the Stevie Wonder classic, included on the Warchild charity album. Hope.
Band Aid 20	2004	"Do They Know It's Christmas?"	Charity single spearheaded by Bob Geldof and which became global smash and hit No. 1 in Britain. Other artists included Dido, Robbie Williams, Joss Stone and Sir Paul McCartney.
Roni Size featuring Beverley Knight & Dynamite MC	2005	"No More"	The song had a strong anti-gun message and featured on the album Return To V. Reached No. 26 on the British charts.
Jools Holland & Beverley Knight	2005	"Where in the World"	An original song composed by Jools and Beverley for his 2005 album Swinging the Blues, Dancing the Ska with his Rhythm & Blues Orchestra.
Aphrodite & Beverly Knight	2006	"Sometimes"	Taken from the album Overdrive, this limited edition single was released as a 12" Vinyl only.
Ali Campbell featuring Beverley Knight	2008	"Running Free"	Taken from the album Running Free, this was released as the third single from Ali Campbell's album of the same name as a download only single on 31 March 2008.
Seven featuring Beverley Knight	2009	"JAIL"	Taken from the album Like a Rocket
Mamas Gun featuring Beverley Knight	2012	"Only One"	Taken from the album The Life and Soul, this was released as the second single from Mamas Gun's second studio album as a download only single on 8 January 2012.
The Justice Collective	2012	"He Ain't Heavy, He's My Brother"	Charity single in aid of the various charities associated with the Hillsborough disaster. The song, a cover of The Hollies single, became the Christmas No. 1 single in UK. Other artists included Paloma Faith, Robbie Williams, Rebecca Ferguson, Eliza Doolittle and Sir Paul McCartney.
Ivan Gough, NERVO & Beverley Knight	2013	"Not Taking This No More"	Vocals parts in collaboration with DJs Ivan Gough and NERVO. Released exclusively on Beatport on 23 September
NHS Relief featuring Beverley Knight, Joss Stone, Omar & The Collective	2020	"Lean On Me"	Charity single for the NHS relief fund.

== Music videos ==
=== Solo ===
Song	Year	Director
"Flavour of the Old School"	1995	
"Down for the One"	1995	
"Flavour of the Old School" (Version 2 – re-release)	1995	
"Made It Back"	1998	Matt Broadley
"Rewind (Find a Way)"	1998	Dawn Shadforth
"Sista Sista"	1998	The New Renaissance
"Made It Back 99"	1999	Jake Nava
"Greatest Day"	1999	Jake Nava
"Sista Sista" (Version 2 – re-release)	1999	
"Get Up!"	2001	Jason Smith
"Shoulda Woulda Coulda"	2002	Douglas Avery
"Gold"	2002	Adrian Moat
"Shape of You (Reshaped)" (featuring Hollywood & Wyclef Jean)	2002	Max & Dania
"Come as You Are"	2004	J.T.
"Not Too Late for Love"	2004	Tim Royes
"Keep This Fire Burning"	2004	J.T.
"Piece of My Heart"	2005	J.T.
"No Man's Land"	2007	J.T.
"After You"	2007	Andy Hylton
"The Queen of Starting Over"	2007	
"Beautiful Night"	2009	J.T.
"In Your Shoes" (featuring Chipmunk)	2009	
"Soul Survivor"	2009	
"Mama Used to Say"	2011	
"Cuddly Toy" (Live from Porchester Hall)	2011	
"One More Try" (Live from Porchester Hall)	2011	
"Always and Forever"	2012	Dean Sherwood
"Marvellous Party"	2017	
"Now or Never"	2019	
"A Christmas Wish"	2020	Vincent Woods
"Everything's Gonna Be Alright" (with Mark Knight featuring London Community Gospel Choir)	2021	
"Systematic Overload"	2023	Eden Tarn

=== Collaborations ===
Song	Year	Director
"Do They Know It's Christmas?" (as part of Band Aid 20)	2003	
"No More" (Roni Size featuring Beverley Knight & Dynamite MC)	2005	Ben Ib
"Running Free" (Ali Campbell featuring Beverley Knight)	2008	
"Only One" (Live) (Mamas Gun featuring Beverley Knight)	2012	

=== Cameo appearances ===
Song	Year	Director
"Free" (Estelle)	2005	Andy Hylton
