= Voice – The Best of Tour =

2006 concert tour by Beverley Knight

- Tour by Beverley Knight
- Associated album: Voice – The Best of Beverley Knight
- Start date: 9 November 2006
- End date: 6 December 2006
- Legs: 1
- No. of shows: 19

Voice – The Best of Tour was a concert tour by British singer-songwriter Beverley Knight, organised to support the album Voice – The Best of Beverley Knight. It began on 9 November 2006 in Cardiff and ended on 6 December 2006 in Plymouth.

== Set list ==
1. "Good Morning World" (intro)
2. "Made It Back"
3. "Get Up"
4. "Flavour of the Old School"
5. "After You"
6. "Supersonic"
7. "Same (As I Ever Was)"
8. "Piece of My Heart"
9. "Shape of You" (acoustic)
10. "Sista Sista" (acoustic)
11. "The Need of You" (acoustic)
12. "Greatest Day"
13. "Black Butta"
14. "Rock Steady"
15. "Gold"
16. "Shoulda Woulda Coulda"
  Encore
17. "Keep This Fire Burning"
18. "Come as You Are"

Footnotes:

- On numerous nights at the start of the tour, the final song performed was "Angels".

== Personnel ==
=== Vocals ===
- Beverley Knight – vocals
- Me'sha Bryan – backing vocals
- Bryan Chambers – backing vocals
- Billie Godfrey – backing vocals

=== Band ===
- Paul Reid – guitars / musical director
- Ashley Kingsley – keyboards
- Darren Abraham – drums
- Paul Bruce – bass

=== Management ===
- Andy Bernstein – tour manager
- Keely Myers – production manager
- Richard "Wez" Wearing – stage manager

=== Additional personnel ===
- Dennie Vidal – FOH engineer
- Steven Abbiss – lighting design
- Simon Piggy Lynch – lighting crew chief
- Craig Pryde – PA tech
- Rob Webster Reed – monitor engineer

== Tour dates ==
| Date | City | Country | Venue |
|---|---|---|---|
| 9 November 2006 | Cardiff | Wales | St David's Hall |
| 10 November 2006 | Oxford | England | New Theatre |
| 11 November 2006 | Brighton | England | The Dome |
| 14 November 2006 | Southampton | England | Guildhall |
| 15 November 2006 | Nottingham | England | Royal Centre |
| 17 November 2006 | Brentwood | England | Leisure Centre |
| 18 November 2006 | Reading | England | Hexagon |
| 20 November 2006 | Ipswich | England | Regent |
| 21 November 2006 | Cambridge | England | Cambridge Corn Exchange |
| 23 November 2006 | Wolverhampton | England | Wolverhampton Civic Hall |
| 24 November 2006 | Glasgow | Scotland | ABC Glasgow |
| 25 November 2006 | Sheffield | England | Octagon |
| 27 November 2006 | Manchester | England | The Lowry |
| 28 November 2006 | Liverpool | England | Philharmonic |
| 29 November 2006 | London | England | Hammersmith Apollo |
| 1 December 2006 | Manchester | England | The Lowry |
| 4 December 2006 | Folkestone | England | Leas Cliff |
| 5 December 2006 | Bristol | England | Colston Hall |
| 6 December 2006 | Plymouth | England | Pavilions |
