= Voice – The Best of Beverley Knight =

Greatest hits album by Beverley Knight
- Released: 20 March 2006
- Recorded: 1994–2005
- Length: 61:37
- Label: Parlophone
- Producer: Chris Braide; Tony Briscoe; Guy Chambers; Dodge; G.H.O.S.T.; Rod Gammons; Sarah Gaston; Jimmy Hogarth; Beverley Knight; Mike Spencer; TNT; Neville Thomas; Pule Pheto; Ben Walker; Hawk Wolinski

Beverley Knight chronology
Affirmation (2004)	Voice – The Best of Beverley Knight (2006)	Music City Soul (2007)

Singles from Voice – The Best of Beverley Knight
- 1. "Piece of My Heart" Released: 13 March 2006

Voice – The Best of Beverley Knight is the first greatest hits album by British singer Beverley Knight. It was released in the United Kingdom on 20 March 2006 by Parlophone. The collection includes twelve UK Top 40 singles, including the newly recorded track and single "Piece of My Heart". The album also includes a second new track co-written with and produced by Chris Braide entitled "Who's Gonna Save Your Soul" and two live tracks. It was supported by the Voice – The Best of Tour.

== Promotion ==
"Piece of My Heart", a cover of the Erma Franklin and Janis Joplin hit, which Knight performed on her 2005 Affirmation Tour, preceded the release of the album on 13 March 2006.

== Critical reception ==
Professional ratings
Review scores
Source	Rating
AllMusic	3/5 stars
musicOMH	3/5 stars

BBC Music critic Lisa Haines called the album "a worthwhile and deeply impressive retrospective Fans of Knight's impeccable soul-gospel vocals will note the remarkable variety of styles here, from the exuberant and impossibly catchy pop of "Keep This Fire Burning," a standout track, to the smooth soul of "Gold" and rock-posturing of "Come As You Are." Ben Hogwood from musicOMH wrote that "regardless of quality, Knight’s voice carries every song here [...] which makes it all the more shameful about the shift towards the middle of the road and the reliance on covers [...] Still, for Knight is ahugely talented, driven lady with one of the best voices around, and while you may skip a song or two here it won’t be on her account. It’s just to be hoped this end of chapter one retrospective sees her taking stock and swinging out of reality TV, back towards the dancefloor." AllMusic editor Sharon Mawer found that Voice – The Best of Beverley Knight is "very representative of [Knight's] body of work." She rated the album three out of five stars.

== Commercial performance ==
Voice – The Best of Beverley Knight was certified silver by the British Phonographic Industry (BPI) on 31 March 2006, less than two weeks after its release. It was later certified gold at end of its fourth week of release by the BPI, on 21 April 2006. The album was certified as Knight's first platinum seller in 2007.

== Track listing ==
1. "Shoulda Woulda Coulda"
2. "Keep This Fire Burning"
3. "Come as You Are"
4. "Piece of My Heart"
5. "Gold"
6. "Made It Back '99" (Good Times 7" Mix)
7. "Get Up!"
8. "Flavour of the Old School" (featuring Rapro)
9. "Sista Sista"
10. "Not Too Late for Love"
11. "Greatest Day" (Classic Mix)
12. "Made It Back" (featuring Redman)
13. "Sweet Thing" (Live on Radio 2)
14. "Angels" (with Guy Chambers) (Live on Radio 2)
15. "Who's Gonna Save Your Soul"

== Charts ==
=== Weekly charts ===
Weekly chart performance for Voice – The Best of Beverley Knight
Chart (2006)	Peak position
Scottish Albums (OCC)	13
UK Albums (OCC)	9
UK R&B Albums (OCC)	3

=== Year-end charts ===
Year-end chart performance for Voice – The Best of Beverley Knight
Chart (2006)	Position
UK Albums (OCC)	82

== Certifications ==
Certifications for Voice – The Best of Beverley Knight
Region	Certification	Certified units/sales
United Kingdom (BPI)	Platinum	300,000^{^}
^{^} Shipments figures based on certification alone.
