= Soulsville (Beverley Knight album) =

2016 studio album by Beverley Knight

Studio album by Beverley Knight
- Released: 10 June 2016
- Length: 45:57
- Label: East West
- Producer: Justin Stanley

Beverley Knight chronology
Soul UK (2011)	Soulsville (2016)	The Fifth Chapter (2023)

Singles from Soulsville
- 1. "Middle of Love" Released: 27 April 2016; 2. "Private Number" Released: 23 July 2016

Soulsville is the eighth studio album by English singer Beverley Knight. It was released by East West Records on 10 June 2016 and marked her first major label release since Affirmation (2004). Produced by Justin Stanley, the album consists of twelve tracks, featuring seven original songs co-penned by Knight and five cover versions of classic Soul and Blues songs, three of which are duets featuring musicians Jamie Cullum, Jools Holland and Sam Moore.

== Critical reception ==
Professional ratings
Review scores
Source	Rating
The Press	4/5 stars

Ian Sime from The Press found that the original songs on Soulsville sit "comfortably with the evergreen numbers [...] However, the cover of Big Momma Thornton’s 'Hound Dog,' featuring Jools Holland, and Beverley’s duet with Sam Moore on his classic 'Hold On, I'm Comin'' are the stand-out tracks. Beverley Knight is a top drawer act and Soulsville is a wicked album." Renowned for Sound editor Michael Smith felt that "while Knight’s previous work has all been highly enjoyable, there’s no doubt that Soulsville is some of her best work to date. The newfound inspiration has done wonders for her music, and she's come back in full force with a collection of tracks that stand together and alone while still remaining genuinely enjoyable either way. Better yet, she's managed to retain her own unique style whilst channelling these inspirations, which keeps it feeling distinctly like a Knight album."

== Chart performance ==
Soulsville debuted and peaked at number nine on the UK Albums Chart in the week of 23 June 2016. It marked Knight's third studio album to reach top ten after 2002's Who I Am and 2007's Music City Soul. The album also peaked at number nine on the Scottish Albums Chart.

== Track listing ==
Soulsville track listing
No.	Title	Writer(s)	Length
1.	"Middle of Love"	Beverley Knight; Jimmy Hogarth	4:10
2.	"When I See You Again"	Knight; Matty Benbrook; Pauline Taylor	3:58
3.	"Private Number" (with Jamie Cullum)	William Bell; Booker T. Jones	3:12
4.	"All Things Must Change"	Knight; Justin Stanley; Deron Johnson	4:00
5.	"I Can't Stand the Rain"	Ann Peebles; Don Bryant; Bernard "Bernie" Miller	3:59
6.	"Red Flag"	Knight; Guy Chambers; Mark Ronson	3:19
7.	"Don't Play That Song for Me"	Ahmet Ertegun; Betty Nelson	4:51
8.	"Still Here"	Knight; Matty Benbrook	3:35
9.	"Sitting on the Edge"	Knight; Hogarth	3:41
10.	"Hound Dog" (featuring Jools Holland)	Jerry Leiber and Mike Stoller	3:06
11.	"I Won't Be Looking Back"	Knight; Paul Barry	3:50
12.	"Hold On, I'm Comin'" (with Sam Moore)	Isaac Hayes; David Porter	4:16
Total length:			45:57

Notes

- "Private Number" is a cover of the same-titled song by Judy Clay and William Bell.
- "I Can't Stand the Rain" is a cover of the same-titled song by Ann Peebles.
- "Don't Play That Song for Me" is a cover of the same-titled song by Ben E. King.
- "Hound Dog" is a cover of the same-titled song by Big Mama Thornton.
- "Hold On, I'm Comin'" is a cover of the same-titled song by Sam & Dave.

== Charts ==
Weekly chart performance for Soulsville
Chart (2016)	Peak position
Scottish Albums (OCC)	10
UK Albums (OCC)	9

== Release history ==
Soulsville release history
Region	Date	Format	Label	Ref.
Various	10 June 2016	CD; digital download	East West Records	
