= Cast All Your Cares =

Single by Beverley Knight

from the album The B-Funk
- Released: 24 March 1997
- Recorded: 1994–1995
- Genre: R&B; Soul
- Length: 5:13
- Label: Dome Records
- Songwriters: Beverley Knight; Neville Thomas; Pule Pheto
- Producers: Neville Thomas; Pule Pheto

Beverley Knight singles chronology
"Mutual Feeling" (1996)	"Cast All Your Cares" (1997)	"Made It Back" (1998)

'Cast All Your Cares' was the last single released off Beverley Knight's debut album, The B-Funk. The song was not released as a single in the UK and only received a very limited release in Europe, becoming something of a rarity. It was her third single release in Germany. "Cast All Your Cares", like most of The B-Funk era singles did not have a promotional video. "Cast All Your Cares" is dedicated to her mother, Dolores Smith, as stated in the album sleeve notes.

This song was a notable landmark in Knight's career as it was her final single with independent label Dome Records, which Knight signed to in 1994. Knight left the label due to musical differences and signed to Parlophone/EMI which allowed her career to hit new heights.

== Track list ==
CD

1. "Cast All Your Cares" (Radio Edit #1) 3:46
2. "Cast All Your Cares" (Radio Edit #2) 3:59
3. "Cast All Your Cares" (Album Version) 5:13
4. "In Time" 5:01

== Personnel ==
- Written by Beverley Knight, Neville Thomas and Pule Pheto
- Produced by Neville Thomas and Pule Pheto
- All vocals performed by Beverley Knight

== See also ==
- Beverley Knight discography
