= Down for the One =

Single by Beverley Knight

from the album The B-Funk
- Released: August 21, 1995
- Recorded: 1994
- Genre: Hip hop soul
- Length: 3:49
- Label: Dome Records
- Songwriters: Beverley Knight, Neville Thomas, Pule Pheto
- Producers: Neville Thomas; Pule Pheto

Beverley Knight singles chronology
"Flavour of the Old School" (1995)	"Down for the One" (1995)	"Flavour of the Old School (Re-Release)" (1995)

"Down for the One" is the second single released by English singer and songwriter Beverley Knight. The track peaked at #55 on the UK Singles Chart when it was released in August 1995, and received support from urban radio.

The music video for the song features Knight performing in a club with two backing dancers. The video also features a cameo from Richard Blackwood. It was unknown to fans that a video existed for the song until the video's release on iTunes on 22 June 2009.

== Critical reception ==
Music & Media wrote, "Vocalist Knight effortlessly wins the battle against a pounding beat. What happened to the drummer–either human or electric–after cutting this fine slice of swingbeat is unclear."

== Track list ==
CD

1. "Down for the One" 3:49
2. "Down for the One" (long version) 5:13
3. "Down for the One" (2B3 Retro mix) 5:12
4. "So Happy" 4:35

== Charts ==
Chart	Peak Position
UK Singles Chart (Official Charts Company)	55

== Personnel ==
- Written by Beverley Knight, Neville Thomas and Pule Pheto
- Produced by Neville Thomas and Pule Pheto
- All vocals performed by Beverley Knight

== See also ==
- Beverley Knight discography
