= Moving On Up (on the Right Side) =

"Moving On Up (On the Right Side)"

Single by Beverley Knight

from the album The B-Funk
- Released: 11 March 1996
- Recorded: 1994
- Genre: British soul; hip hop soul
- Length: 5:08
- Label: Dome Records
- Songwriters: W. Jones, S. Jones
- Producer: The Ethnic Boyz

Beverley Knight singles chronology
"Flavour of the Old School (Re-Release)" (1995)	"Moving On Up (On the Right Side)" (1996)	"Mutual Feeling" (1996)

"Moving On Up (On the Right Side)" is the fourth single released by British R&B singer-songwriter Beverley Knight, taken from her debut album, The B-Funk (1995). It was written by W. Jones and S. Jones and produced by The Ethnic Boyz. The song contains a sample of "You're Too Good To Me" by the soul musician Curtis Mayfield, which was also sampled by American singer-songwriter Mary J. Blige on her single "Be Happy" for her second album My Life (1994). Both songs were recorded in 1994.

"Moving On Up (On the Right Side)" peaked at #42 on the UK Singles Chart when it was released in March 1996 as a single. The song did not have a promotional video made to accompany the release but it received support from urban radio which helped the release chart inside the top 75. The single is one of the few original recordings (excluding cover versions) released by Knight to date that she did not write herself.

Knight most recently performed "Moving On Up (On the Right Side)" on her Soul UK tour as part of a medley.

== Track list ==
CD single

1. "Moving On Up (On the Right Side)" (Radio Version) - 4:13
2. "Moving On Up (On the Right Side)" (Ethnic Boyz Remix) - 5:09
3. "Moving On Up (On the Right Side)" (D-Lux Remix) 5:14
4. "Moving On Up (On the Right Side)" (Full Crew/Wayne Lawnes Remix) - 5:06
5. "Moving On Up (On the Right Side)" (Ee Be's Rap Remix) - 5:34
6. "Moving On Up (On the Right Side)" (Album Version) - 5:08

12" vinyl

1. "Moving On Up (On the Right Side)" (Album Version) - 5:08
2. "Moving On Up (On the Right Side)" (Ethnic Boyz Remix) - 5:09
3. "Moving On Up (On the Right Side)" (D-Lux Remix) 5:14
4. "Moving On Up (On the Right Side)" (Ee Be's Rap Remix) - 5:34

== Personnel ==
- Written by Westley
- Produced by The Ethnic Boyz
- All vocals performed by Beverley Knight

== Charts ==
Chart (1996)	Peak position
UK Singles (OCC)	42
UK Club Chart (Music Week)	35

== Release history ==
Region	Date	Format
United Kingdom	8 March 1996	CD single, 12" vinyl

== See also ==
- Beverley Knight discography
