= The Fifth Chapter =

The Fifth Chapter may refer to:

- The Fifth Chapter (Scooter album), 2014
- The Fifth Chapter (Beverley Knight album), 2023
