= Mutual Feeling =

Single by Beverley Knight

from the album The B-Funk
- Released: 28 October 1996
- Recorded: 1994
- Genre: R&B; hip hop soul
- Length: 4:54
- Label: Dome Records
- Songwriters: Beverley Knight, Tony Olabode, Victor Redwood-Sawyer
- Producers: Tony Olabode; Victor Redwood-Sawyerr

Beverley Knight singles chronology
"Moving On Up (on the Right Side)" (1996)	"Mutual Feeling" (1996)	"Cast All Your Cares" (1997)

"Mutual Feeling" is the fifth single (fourth song) released by the British R&B recording artist Beverley Knight from her debut album The B-Funk (1995). The track, which peaked at #124 on the UK Singles Chart when it was released in 1996, did not have a promotional video made to accompany it. It was, however, a top 20 hit on the UK Hip Hop & R&B singles chart. "Mutual Feeling" was co-written and produced by Blak Twang, who also produced a remix for the single.

== In popular culture ==
The song was sampled by American rapper Playboi Carti for the track "Backd00r" which features Kendrick Lamar and Jhené Aiko, on his 2025 album Music.

== Track list ==
1. "Mutual Feeling" (Radio Version) 3:57
2. "Mutual Feeling" (featuring Blak Twang) (Remix) 4:53
3. "Mutual Feeling" (D-Lux Remix) 5:04
4. "Mutual Feeling" (Linslee Remix) 4:35
5. "Mutual Feeling" (featuring Blak Twang) (Minnx Remix) 5:10
6. "Mutual Feeling" (featuring Blak Twang) (Munroe Remix) 5:08

== Charts ==
Chart (1996)	Peak position
UK Singles Chart	124
UK Hip Hop & R&B	19

== Personnel ==
- Written by Beverley Knight, Tony Olabode and Victor Redwood-Sawyerr
- Produced by Tony Olabode and Victor Redwood-Sawyerr
- All vocals performed by Beverley Knight

== See also ==
- Beverley Knight discography
