= Shape of You (Reshaped) =

Single by Beverley Knight featuring Wyclef Jean & Hollywood

from the album Who I Am
- Released: March 3, 2003
- Recorded: 2003
- Genre: R&B
- Length: 3:46
- Label: Parlophone
- Songwriter(s): Beverley Knight; Wyclef Jean; Jerry 'Wonder' Duplessis; J. Jean
- Producer(s): Wyclef Jean; Jerry 'Wonder' Duplessis

Beverley Knight featuring Wyclef Jean & Hollywood singles chronology
"Gold" (2002)	"Shape of You (Reshaped)" (2003)	"Come as You Are" (2004)

"Shape of You (Reshaped)" is the fourth and final single from Beverley Knight's album, Who I Am. It was a remix of the album track "Shape of You", featuring new vocals, lyrics and production by Wyclef Jean and was included on a re-release of the album in 2003. The remixed track was originally due for release in November 2002 but due to promotional reasons it was put back until early 2003. The single was a limited edition, containing a sticker, which by UK chart rules makes the single unable to qualify for the charts. The B-side "Whatever's Clever" has been release as a single in several south European countries, like Italy or Switzerland.

The video for the single was directed by Max & Dania.

== Track list ==
1. "Shape of You (Reshaped)" (featuring Hollywood)
2. "Shape of You" (album version)
3. "Whatever's Clever" (Fusion mix)
4. "Shape of You (Reshaped)" (video) (featuring Hollywood and Wyclef Jean)

== Personnel ==
- Written by Beverley Knight, Wyclef Jean, Jerry Duplessis and J. Jean
- Produced by Wyclef Jean and Jerry Duplessis
- All vocals performed and arranged by Beverley Knight
- Additional rap and spoken vocals provided by Hollywood and Wyclef Jean
- Recorded at Platinum Sound Studios, NYC

== See also ==
- Beverley Knight discography
