= The B-Funk =

Studio album by Beverley Knight
- Released: 26 November 1995
- Recorded: 1994–1995
- Genre: R&B; British soul; pop
- Length: 65:01
- Label: Dome
- Producer: 2B3 Productions; Blak Twang; Colin Burke; Dwayne Burke; Ethnic Boyz; Irmgard Klarmann; V.R.S.; Felix Weber

Beverley Knight chronology
The B-Funk (1995)	Prodigal Sista (1998)

Singles from The B-Funk
- 1. "Flavour of the Old School" Released: 27 March 1995; 2. "Down for the One" Released: 21 August 1995; 3. "Moving On Up (On the Right Side)" Released: 11 March 1996; 4. "Mutual Feeling" Released: 28 October 1996; 5. "Cast All Your Cares" Released: 24 March 1997

Professional ratings
Review scores
Source	Rating
AllMusic	2.5/5 stars
The Guardian	4/5 stars
Muzik	4/5 stars

The B-Funk is the debut studio album by the British R&B and soul singer-songwriter Beverley Knight. It was released on 26 November 1995 by independent record label Dome Records.

== Release and reception ==
The B-Funk was released in November 1995 on independent record label Dome Records. It received wide critical acclaim by the urban media in Britain with Echoes magazine labelling it "the best British soul album ever" and Billboard magazine stating that "this lady is on her way to becoming an international star." The album was also named Album of the Year by Blues & Soul in 1996, also earning Knight R&B Act of the Year at the 1996 Black Music Awards in London. However, the commercial success of the album did not match its critical acclaim, peaking at number 145 on the UK Albums Chart. In total, six singles were released from the album, including two releases of "Flavour of the Old School" and a limited edition international release of "Cast All Your Cares."

The album was the only LP released by Knight on Dome Records. After creative differences with the label, Knight decided to leave and sign a new contract with Parlophone Records in 1997. To capitalise on Knight's increased success at the label, Dome have subsequently re-released The B-Funk several times—the first being on 31 May 1999, after Knight won two awards at the MOBO Awards, and then again on 8 May 2006, after the top 10 success of her hits collection, Voice - The Best of Beverley Knight. On both occasions, the album was re-released with bonus remixes of the singles.

== Track listing ==
The B-Funk – Standard edition
No.	Title	Writer(s)	Producer(s)	Length
1.	"The B-Funk"	Knight	2B3 Productions	1:10
2.	"Moving on Up (On the Right Side)"	W. Jones; S. Jones	Ethnic Boyz	5:09
3.	"Mutual Feeling"	Knight; Tony Olabode; Victor Redwood-Sawyer	Blak Twang; V.R.S.	4:53
4.	"Flavour of the Old School"	Knight; Neville Thomas; Pule Pheto	2B3 Productions	4:46
5.	"Remedy"	Irmgard Klarmann; Felix Weber	Klarmann; Weber	4:07
6.	"Down for the One"	Knight; Thomas; Pheto	2B3 Productions	5:16
7.	"Steppin' On My Shoes"	Knight; C. Burke; Flowers; D. Burke	Colin Burke; Dwayne Burke	4:43
8.	"Promise You Forever"	Knight; Thomas; Pheto	2B3 Productions	5:52
9.	"It's Your Time"	Knight; Swain	2B3 Productions	4:26
10.	"So Happy"	Knight; Thomas; Pheto	2B3 Productions	4:34
11.	"Cast All Your Cares"	Knight; Thomas; Pheto	2B3 Productions	5:15
12.	"U've Got It"	Klarmann; Weber	Klarmann; Weber	4:36
13.	"In Time"	Knight; Swain	2B3 Productions	4:59
14.	"Goodbye Innocence"	Knight	2B3 Productions	5:11
Total length:				65:01

The B-Funk – Reissue bonus tracks
No.	Title	Length
15.	"Flavour of the Old School" (Club Remix)	4:58
16.	"Moving on Up" (Ethnic Boyz Remix)	5:14
Total length:		75:13

The B-Funk – Special edition (disc 2)
No.	Title	Length
1.	"Flavour of the Old School" (Club Remix)	4:58
2.	"Down for the One" (2B3 Retro Mix)	5:15
3.	"Moving on Up" (Ethnic Boyz Remix)	5:14
4.	"Moving on Up" (Ee Bee's Rap Remix)	5:38
5.	"Mutual Feeling" (Monroe's Remix)	5:12
6.	"Mutual Feeling" (D-Lux Remix)	5:05
Total length:		31:22

== Charts ==
Chart (1995)	Peak position
UK Albums (Official Charts)	145
UK R&B Albums (Official Charts)	20
