= After You (Beverley Knight song) =

Single by Beverley Knight

from the album Music City Soul
- Released: 2 July 2007 (physical and digital single)
- Recorded: October 2006
- Genre: Soul
- Length: 3:59 (radio edit)
- Label: Parlophone
- Songwriter(s): M. Leeson; P. Vale
- Producer(s): Pete Vale (radio edit)

Beverley Knight singles chronology
"No Man's Land" (2007)	"After You" (2007)	"The Queen of Starting Over" (2007)

"After You" is the second single released from British singer-songwriter Beverley Knight's fifth studio album, Music City Soul. The radio edit of the song was produced by Pete Vale and has different production and vocals to the original album version, which was produced by Mark Nevers. It was released in the UK on 2 July 2007.

The single was confirmed for release in an interview with BBC Radio 4's Woman's Hour programme on 8 May 2007 and the video for the song, directed by Andy Hylton, was premiered online on 25 May 2007.

At present, "After You" is Knight's final physical single release.

== Track listing ==
CD:

1. "After You" (radio edit) (M. Leeson, P. Vale)
2. "Time is Now" (B. Knight, G. Chambers)

Download only versions:

1. "After You" (album version)
2. "After You" (live from The Living Room) (iTunes exclusive)

== Chart performance ==
Like previous single "No Man's Land", "After You" was added straight to the A-list at BBC Radio 2 and was also the radio station's record of the week. The song entered the UK airplay chart at number fifty, after only four days of radio play. The following week, "After You" rocketed up the airplay chart, climbing from number fifty to number seven, one of Knight's highest charting airplay singles to date and her biggest climb on the radio airplay chart. "After You" also became the most played single on BBC Radio 2, between 11 June 2007 and 16 June 2007 and the music video for the song charted at number-one in the TV airplay pre-release chart.

"After You" is one of Knight's biggest commercial failures, missing the top seventy-five altogether, peaking at a lowly one-hundred and thirty-one. It is Knight's lowest chart position since the first issue of "Sista Sista" missed the top two-hundred and "Mutual Feeling" made one-hundred and twenty-four.

== Charts ==
Chart (2007)	Peak Position
UK Singles Chart	131
UK R&B Singles Chart	8
UK Airplay Chart	7
