= No Man's Land (Beverley Knight song) =

Single by Beverley Knight

from the album Music City Soul
- Released: (United Kingdom) 16 April 2007 (download); 30 April 2007 (physical single); 21 August 2007 (iTunes festival EP digital single)
- Recorded: October 2006
- Genre: Soul
- Length: 3:26
- Label: Parlophone
- Songwriters: Beverley Knight; Eg White; Jimmy Hogarth
- Producers: Eg White; Jimmy Hogarth

Beverley Knight singles chronology
"Piece of My Heart" (2006)	"No Man's Land" (2007)	"After You" (2007)

Alternative cover
- UK CD: 2 single cover

"No Man's Land" is the first single released by British singer-songwriter Beverley Knight from her fifth studio album, Music City Soul. The song was released on 16 April 2007 digitally and 30 April 2007 physically and peaked at number forty-three on the UK singles chart. A further digital single was released on August 21, 2007, in support of her live performances at the iTunes festival in July, 2007, containing three live tracks. The digital EP release was the first of a two-part digital single, the second being released to promote the third single from Music City Soul, "The Queen of Starting Over".

== Background and production ==
"No Man's Land" was written by Beverley Knight with Jimmy Hogarth and Eg White and produced by Jimmy Hogarth & Eg White in late 2006. The lyrics of the song reflect Knight's emotional state after the break-up of a long-term relationship: "This song came about referring to my relationship, and feeling that even though I was out of the relationship, I wasn't able to put it behind me and move on to the next phase. Something which I know lots of people experience, and to me it felt like no mans land."

The production is made up completely of live instruments, illustrating the organic approach Knight took in recording the song and its album, Music City Soul. On reflection of "No Man's Land", Knight noted: "That song was quite painful to write, but cathartic because once I'd written it, I thought 'I've said what I wanted to say'."

== Track listing ==
CD: 1

1. "No Man's Land"
2. "Shoulda Woulda Coulda"

CD: 2

1. "No Man's Land"
2. "Time Is on My Side" (Nashville acoustic version)
3. "Piece of My Heart" (Heart 106.2 live acoustic version)
4. "No Man's Land" (video)
5. "No Man's Land" (making of)

Download only versions:

1. "No Man's Land" (Nashville version) (iTunes exclusive)

iTunes festival EP release:

1. "No Man's Land" (live at the iTunes festival)
2. "Saviour" (live at the iTunes festival)
3. "Shoulda Woulda Coulda" (Philly mix) (live at the iTunes festival)

== Music video ==
The music video for "No Man's Land" was shot in South Africa during February 2007 and was directed by JT, who had previously worked with Knight on the videos for "Come as You Are", "Keep This Fire Burning" and "Piece of My Heart". Set in the Hout Bay area of Cape Town, the video features Knight walking through a large open field before moving to other locations such as a park, hotel bedroom and beach.

The location for the video was of special significance to Beverley as it was an area she had visited previously in connection with her charity work in bring awareness to HIV in South Africa. It was also the location of the video to her single "Shoulda Woulda Coulda", released in 2002.

The video was premiered on AOL's website in late March 2007, before being released to television.

== Chart performance ==
"No Man's Land" was premiered by Ken Bruce on BBC Radio 2 in March 2007 and was subsequently made "record of the week" for the week beginning March 17, 2007. The following week, "No Man's Land" was added straight on to the A-list of BBC Radio 2's playlist. However the song failed to make the same impact on other radio stations, peaking at number thirty-three on the UK airplay chart.

On the UK Singles Chart, "No Man's Land" peaked at number forty-three making it Knight's lowest chart position in nine years. The song's poor performance was also reflected by the fact it failed to appear in either the top forty of the download chart or the TV airplay chart.

== Charts ==
Chart (2007)	Peak Position
UK Singles Chart	43
UK R&B Singles Chart	7
UK Airplay Chart	33
