= The Queen of Starting Over =

Single by Beverley Knight

from the album Music City Soul
- Released: (United Kingdom) 15 October 2007 (iTunes festival EP digital single)
- Recorded: October 2006
- Genre: Soul
- Length: 3:47
- Label: Parlophone
- Songwriter(s): P. Vale
- Producer(s): Mark Nevers

Beverley Knight singles chronology
"After You" (2007)	"The Queen of Starting Over" (2007)	"Every Step" (2009)

"The Queen of Starting Over" is the third single released from British singer-songwriter Beverley Knight's fifth studio album, Music City Soul. "The Queen of Starting Over" was a download only release, Knight's first single in her career that was not released on a CD single format. The single was the second of a two-part digital single to be released containing tracks from her live performances at the iTunes live festival from July 2007 (the first part was a live EP release of "No Man's Land") . The release date for the single was 15 October 2007, a week prior to her UK tour supporting the Music City Soul album.

"The Queen of Starting Over" failed to chart upon its single release and was her final single for the Parlophone label.

== Track listing ==
Digital EP single:

1. "The Queen of Starting Over" (live at the iTunes festival) (P. Vale)
2. "Black Butta" (live at the iTunes festival) (B. Knight, G. Chambers)
3. "Piece of My Heart" (live at the iTunes festival). (J. Ragovoy, B. Berns)
