= Not Too Late for Love =

2004 single by Beverley Knight

Single by Beverley Knight

from the album Affirmation
- Released: 27 September 2004
- Length: 4:22 (album version); 3:55 (radio edit)
- Label: Parlophone
- Songwriter(s): Beverley Knight; Chris Braide
- Producer(s): Chris Braide

Beverley Knight singles chronology
"Come As You Are" (2003)	"Not Too Late for Love" (2004)	"Keep This Fire Burning" (2005)

Alternative cover
- UK CD: 2 single cover

"Not Too Late for Love" is the second single from Beverley Knight's fourth studio album, Affirmation. The single reached number 11 in the airplay chart and peaked at number 31 on the UK Singles Chart. At that time, it was her lowest chart position since "Sista Sista" in 1999. However this has since been eclipsed by the 2007 single, "No Man's Land" (co-written by Eg White and Jimmy Hogarth), which peaked at number 43 becoming her lowest chart position in nine years, and "After You", which charted at number 131, both of which are from Music City Soul, her 2007 album.

== Video ==
The promo video for "Not Too Late for Love" was directed by Tim Royes and released in early September 2004. Some shots were of Beverley in a more urban city environment and the other shots were of Beverley in a golden wheat field.

== Track listings ==
CD 1

1. "Not Too Late for Love" (radio edit)
2. "Remember Me"

CD 2

1. "Not Too Late for Love" (radio edit)
2. "Spin"
3. "Sweet Thing" (Live for BBC Radio 2)
4. "Not Too Late for Love" (video)

== Personnel ==
- Written by Beverley Knight and Chris Braide
- Produced by Chris Braide
- Engineered and mixed by Mark "Tufty" Evans
- Assistant engineer: Paul Stanborough
- All vocals by Beverley Knight
- All instruments by Chris Braide
- Recorded at the Area 21, London

== Charts ==
Chart (2004)	Peak position
UK Singles (OCC)	31
UK Hip Hop/R&B (OCC)	10

== See also ==
- Beverley Knight discography
