= London Community Gospel Choir =

British gospel choir

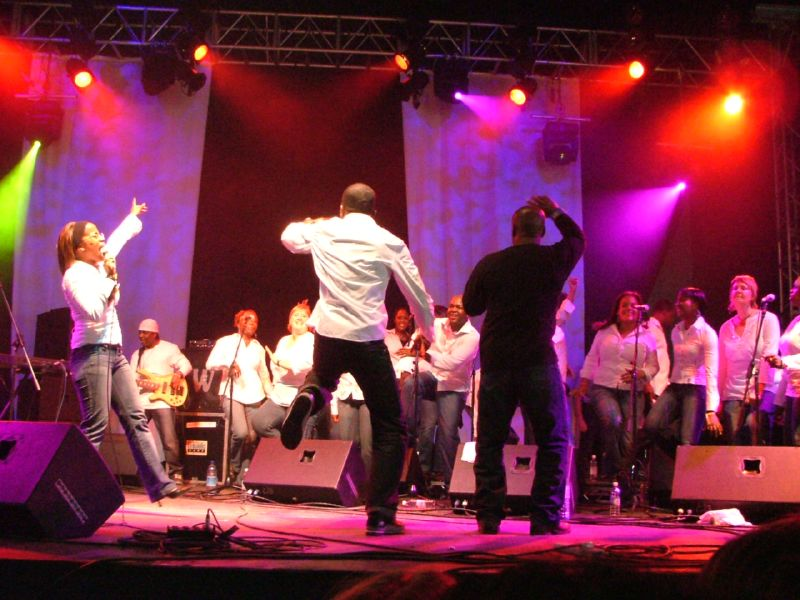
The choir performing

The London Community Gospel Choir (LCGC) is a British contemporary gospel choir and performance group that has toured internationally. The choir fuses gospel music with multiple genres, including pop, soul, jazz, R&B, and classical music. It was founded in 1982 and has performed with artists such as Justin Timberlake, Madonna, Gorillaz, and Kylie Minogue.

== History ==
The London Community Gospel Choir was founded in 1982 by the Reverend Bazil Meade, with Lawrence Johnson, "Delroy" Powell, and John Francis. He would later go on to form The Inspirational Choir of the Pentecostal First Born Church of the Living God.

Initially, the choir was formed for a single concert, performed by a 120-voice choir before an audience of over a thousand people. The performance was meant to be a one-time event, but due to its success, a permanent choir was formed.

The success of the first concert led to requests for the choir to appear on television, radio, and at various corporate functions across the United Kingdom and Europe. The choir debuted on television with a performance on Channel Four's Black on Black. In December 2003, The Guardian described the choir as "controversial, professional, energetic, inspiring, and spirit-filled!"

== Recordings ==
The choir recorded a version of the OutKast song "Hey Ya!" with Razorlight (the B-side to their single "Vice"), featured on Will Young's debut album From Now On, and sang on Blur's hit, "Tender". They also provided backing vocals on Erasure's 1995 self-titled album, and on the Nick Cave and the Bad Seeds double album Abattoir Blues The Lyre of Orpheus (2005). They also performed on the songs "Don't Get Lost in Heaven" and "Demon Days" on Gorillaz' Demon Days album. The choir sang on the 2003 single "Nothing Fails" by Madonna. Further recordings the choir contributed to were for Paul McCartney, Elton John, Westlife, Elkie Brooks, Tori Amos, Drumsound and Bassline Smith, Paper Route, Dermot Kennedy, Gregory Porter, and Brockhampton.

The choir recorded the song "Circle of Life" as part of the original motion picture soundtrack for The Lion King, which was nominated for the Best Original Song at the 1995 Academy Awards. They also made a guest appearance on Billie Piper's hit song "Honey to the Bee".

The Edge of LCGC, a branch of the choir, released a limited-edition album, Keep Moving, as part of their yearly five-night residency at London's Jazz Café. The full version was released in Spring 2008.

In 2009, the choir recorded a single named "I Got Soul" in support of the charity War Child. In October 2009, this single reached #10 in the UK Singles Chart, making it the London Community Gospel Choir's first top ten hit.

The choir featured on the Artists for Grenfell charity single "Bridge Over Troubled Water" in 2017. In 2020, they collaborated with the pop group The 1975 on the track, Nothing Revealed / Everything Denied on their fourth studio album. In 2023, they also collaborated with Beverley Knight on several tracks on her ninth studio album, The Fifth Chapter.

== Discography ==
- Fill My Cup (1983)
- Feel the Spirit (1986)
- Gospel Greats (1990)
- Hush and Listen (1992)
- Live! Inspiration and Power (1996)
- Out of Many, One Voice (1998)
- Joy to the World (1999)
- Force Behind the Power (2001)
- Negro Spirituals and Gospel Songs (2002)
- Live at Abbey Road: 21st Anniversary Concert (2003)
- Keep Moving (Limited Edition) (2007)
- Glorious (2010)
- The Best of LCGC: Celebrating 30 Years (2012)
- Peace This Christmas (2014)

== Bibliography ==
- Bazil Meade, with Jan Greenough, A Boy, a Journey, a Dream: The Story of Bazil Meade and the London Community Gospel Choir. London: Monarch Books, 2011.
