= The Fifth Chapter (Beverley Knight album) =

Studio album by Beverley Knight
- Released: 29 September 2023
- Length: 37:03
- Label: Tag8; BMG
- Producer: Mitch Allan; Bart; AC Burrell; Serban Cazan; Joshua Cohen; Jimmy Hogarth; Marcus Johnson; Ben Jones; Mark Knight; Ali Tennant; DJ Walde

Beverley Knight chronology
Soulsville (2016)	The Fifth Chapter (2023)

Singles from The Fifth Chapter
- 1. "Last One on My Mind" Released: 9 June 2023; 2. "Systematic Overload" Released: 17 August 2023; 3. "I'm on Fire" Released: 25 October 2023; 4. "Not Prepared for You" Released: 9 February 2024

The Fifth Chapter is the ninth studio album by English singer Beverley Knight. It was released by Tag8 Music and BMG Rights Management on 29 September 2023, being both her first album in seven years and her first collection of original material in fourteen years. The album celebrates Knight's 50th birthday, and she explained: "I feel as though I am about to step into a whole new level of wonder because I have come into my power. My career is not a big shiny billboard poster that gets replaced with the next star in waiting. Mine is a novel, and I just entered the Fifth and most exciting chapter of it."

It was preceded by the singles "Last One on My Mind" and "Systematic Overload" and includes several collaborations with the London Community Gospel Choir and a bonus track featuring DJ Mark Knight that originally appeared on his 2021 album, Untold Business. "I'm on Fire", one of the collaborations with the Choir, was released as the third single.

The album debuted in the UK Albums Chart on 6 October 2023 at number 39, Knight's lowest-charting studio release in 25 years (since Prodigal Sista in 1998).

== Background ==
The release of "The Fifth Chapter" was announced on 10 June 2023. It was Knight's first studio album in seven years following Soulsville and first release since her live album BK25 (with the Leo Green Orchestra), which was released in 2019. Knight said in a statement: "my new album covers the kaleidoscope of my soul influences from disco, R&B, funk, gospel through to northern soul and big ballads. Maintaining a dual career in acting meant that for the first time I stepped back from my usual songwriting to allow some of the world's greatest songwriters to scribe my thoughts. This album is a true team effort of incredible talents for which I am truly grateful."

When talking about the album in interviews, Knight noted the importance of embracing turning 50 in an industry that historically eschews older women and declared "this is the most settled and optimistic I've ever felt. I'm a joyful person naturally and it takes a lot to get me down, so I'm naturally that person who is always looking up but now I feel like I'm looking into the stratosphere. I feel as though the big take-off that everybody, God bless them, is hoping for me is right here now. It's ready to go and ready to happen. I've never felt so sure of it and I've got a great collection of songs with which to do it."

Discussing the development of the project with Graham Norton, Knight described it as "totally different" to her previous work and noted her initial reluctance to make a new album, explaining "I've been so busy with theatre, and I didn't want to write an album because I had to write [it], in case all the songs turned out to be really, really rubbish. So I thought, you know what, there are great songwriters on this earth. Let me have them come to me with songs. What I've ended up with is an array of songs, which are just really, really great, written by really talented people. I kind of pulled the whole project together, but for the first time in my life, it's not me doing all the writing."

== Promotion ==
Knight promoted the album with a set at Victoria Park in Leicester as part of Radio 2 Live on 16 September. She subsequently embarked on her biggest-ever UK tour, performing 20 dates across October and November 2023, concluding with a concert at the London Palladium.

=== Singles ===
The lead single, "Last One on My Mind", was released on 9 June, 2023. Knight referred to the track as "a sassy no nonsense but joyous sounding song with a big nod to modern disco. It's about taking your power back from a former lover and striding into the future. It gets in you and stays there."

The album's second single "Systematic Overload", was released on August 17, 2023. Of the song, Knight explained "Systematic Overload is another style departure for me. It's a colourful, kaleidoscopic sounding modern pop song with the soulful element coming from my vocal and the groove. From the moment I started singing, I was riding the rhythm. I love the tough beats and heavy bass. It's disco for now, a very different sound for me, but with the high energy I'm used to." On 24 August 2023, Knight released the official music video, directed by Eden Tarn.

On 9 February 2024, Knight released "Not Prepared for You" as the album's fourth single.

== Live performances ==
On 16 September 2023, Knight performed "Last One on My Mind" and "Systematic Overload", among her previous hits, during her set at Radio 2 in the Park, which was held at Victoria Park, Leicester. She performed "I'm on Fire" on Strictly Come Dancing on 16 October 2023.

== Critical reception ==
Professional ratings
Review scores
Source	Rating
I	3/5 stars
Retro Pop Magazine	4/5 stars

The Fifth Chapter garnered fairly positive reviews from critics. Ed Power, writing for I, praised the album content, opining, "It is, aptly, a celebration of wisdom, confidence and knowing what you want from life. But above all, it is a valentine to finding strength in adversity." Power praised Knight's vocals, but added that he felt the album was "more of a playlist hopscotching from genre to genre than a coherent work." Garry Bushell, writing for The Daily Express called the album "immaculate set from a world-class performer who is hard to pigeonhole."

Retro Pop Magazine called The Fifth Chaper a "superb return", stating that the effort was "unquestionably [Knight's] strongest release since [...] Who I Am. Graham Clark from Cumbria Times felt that The Fifth Chapter "sees the Wolverhampton-born singer discovering her groove again over the eleven tracks, albeit with some reservations. With so many different writers and a mix of producers, the end result is not as coherent as it could have been [...] – for now, though The Fifth Chapter is a kaleidoscope of her musical influences over the years." Renowned for Sound editor Matt Say found that the album "serves as a stunning contribution to the rich and evocative world of Soul music, standing on its own as a towering achievement in her career as well as fitting in with her already sparkling discography." He concluded: "Beverley Knight is truly one of the biggest treasures of the British music industry."

== Chart performance ==
The Fifth Chapter debuted and peaked at the UK Albums Chart at number 39, Knight's lowest-charting studio release in 25 years, since Prodigal Sista (1998). It also reached number six on the UK Independent Albums Chart.

== Track listing ==
The Fifth Chapter - CD, download, streaming track listing
No.	Title	Writer(s)	Producer(s)	Length
1.	"Last One on My Mind"	Hannah Wilson; Julia Fabrin; Serban Cazan	Serban Cazan^{[p]}	2:44
2.	"The One I'm Gonna Love"	Diane Warren	AC Burrell	3:06
3.	"Cold World" (with the London Community Gospel Choir)	Ollie Green; Sebastian Kole; Stephen Puth	Green	2:51
4.	"Someone Else's Problem"	Christopher Neil; Laura White; Peter Vale	Ben Jones	3:38
5.	"I'm on Fire" (with the London Community Gospel Choir)	Evan Bogart; Idan Raichel; Jessica Ashley; Mitch Allan	Bart; Allan^{[p]}	3:35
6.	"Not Prepared for You"	Warren	Burrell	4:01
7.	"Queen of Everything"	DJ Walde; Joshua Cohen	DJ Walde; Cohen; Adriano Desiré Murgia^{[a]}	3:34
8.	"A Little Bit of Love"	Beverley Knight; Andrew Roachford; Jimmy Hogarth	Hogarth	4:10
9.	"Nostalgia"	Ali Tennant; Marcus Johnson	Tennant^{[p]}; Johnson	2:33
10.	"Systematic Overload"	Andrei Maria; Lee James; Noelle Scaggs; Cazan	Cazan	3:17
11.	"Everything's Gonna Be Alright" (with Mark Knight and the London Community Gospel Choir)	B. Knight; James Hurr; Andreya Triana; Mark Knight	M. Knight	3:34
Total length:				37:03

The Fifth Chapter track listing - vinyl
No.	Title	Writer(s)	Producer(s)	Length
1.	"Last One on My Mind"	Wilson; Fabrin; Cazan	Cazan^{[p]}	2:44
2.	"The One I'm Gonna Love"	Warren	Burrell	3:06
3.	"Not Prepared for You"	Warren	Burrell	4:01
4.	"Queen of Everything"	Walde; Cohen	Walde; Cohen; Murgia^{[a]}	3:34
5.	"Someone Else's Problem"	Neil; White; Vale	Jones	3:38
6.	"I'm on Fire" (with the London Community Gospel Choir)	Bogart; Raichel; Ashley; Allan	Bart; Allan^{[p]}	3:35
7.	"Cold World" (with the London Community Gospel Choir)	Green; Kole; Puth	Green	2:51
8.	"A Little More Love"	Knight; Roachford; Hogarth	Hogarth	4:10
9.	"Nostalgia"	Tennant; Johnson	Tennant^{[p]}; Johnson	2:33
10.	"Systematic Overload"	Maria; James; Scaggs; Cazan	Cazan	3:17
11.	"Everything's Gonna Be Alright" (with Mark Knight and the London Community Gospel Choir)	B. Knight; Hurr; Triana; M. Knight	M. Knight	3:34
Total length:				37:03

Notes

- ^{^[p]} signifies a primary and vocal producer.
- ^{^[a]} signifies an additional producer.
- The vinyl itself plays in a different order than the cover tracklisting. "Systematic Overload" plays as track 8, "A Little More Love" as track 9 and "Nostalgia" as track 10.

== Personnel ==
Track numbers are based on the CD and streaming versions of the album.

Musicians

- Beverley Knight – lead vocals (all tracks), backing vocals (tracks 1, 3), vocal arrangement (3, 5)
- Serban Cazan – drum programming, keyboards (1, 10); piano (1)
- DJ Munro – backing vocals (1)
- Hannah Wilson – backing vocals (1)
- Bryan "Bdub" White – bass (2, 6)
- AC Burrell – keyboards, programming (2, 6)
- Erin Thompkins – backing vocals (2)
- London Community Gospel Choir – vocals (3, 11)
- Ollie Green – backing vocals, drums, piano (3)
- Sebastian Kole – backing vocals (3)
- Stephen Puth – backing vocals (3)
- Ben Jones – instrumentation (4)
- Daniel Bingham – piano (4)
- Mitch Allan – backing vocals, organ, programming (5)
- Jessica Ashley – backing vocals (5)
- Bart – programming (5)
- Alex Tearner – backing vocals (6)
- Jennifer Malsch – backing vocals (6)
- Melodye Perry – backing vocals (6)
- Josh Cohen – programming, synthesizer (7)
- DJ Walde – programming (7)
- Jimmy Hogarth – bass, percussion, programming (8)
- Reuben Hogarth – drums (8)
- Andrew Roachford – piano (8)
- Adriano Desiré Murgia – additional programming (9)
- Ali Tennant – backing vocals (9)
- Freddie Thompson – bass (9)
- Marcus Johnson – drums, keyboards (9)
- Curtis Cumberbatch – guitar (9)
- Lee Anna James – backing vocals (10)
- Noelle Scaggs – backing vocals (10)
- Sateanu Alexandru Vladimir – bass (10)

Technical

- Serban Cazan – engineering (1, 10)
- Geoff Pesche – engineering (2–11)
- Mario Luccy – engineering (2, 6)
- Ollie Green – engineering (3)
- Ben Jones – engineering (3)
- Bart – engineering (5)
- Mitch Allan – engineering (5)
- Brennan Mari – engineering (5)
- Adriano Desiré Murgia – engineering (7, 9)
- DJ Walde – engineering (7)
- Josh Cohen – engineering (7)
- Pierpaolo Demarchi – engineering (7)
- Jimmy Hogarth – engineering (8)
- Ali Tennant – engineering (9)
- Marcus Johnson – engineering (9)
- DJ Munro – additional vocal engineering (1)

== Charts ==
Chart performance for The Fifth Chapter
Chart (2023)	Peak position
Scottish Albums (OCC)	24
UK Albums (OCC)	39
UK Independent Albums (OCC)	6

== Release history ==
The Fifth Chapter release history
Region	Date	Format(s)	Label	Ref.
Various	29 September 2023	CD; digital download; streaming	Tag8 Music; BMG Rights Management	
