= Gold (Beverley Knight song) =

Single by Beverley Knight

from the album Who I Am
- Released: June 24, 2002
- Recorded: 2001
- Genre: Soul
- Length: 4:52 (Album/Original version); 3:52 (single mix)
- Label: Parlophone
- Songwriters: Beverley Knight, Mike Spencer
- Producer: Mike 'Spike' Drake

Beverley Knight singles chronology
"Shoulda Woulda Coulda" (2002)	"Gold" (2002)	"Shape of You (Reshaped)" (2003)

"Gold" is the third single released from Beverley Knight's studio album, Who I Am. The song, which peaked at #27 in Britain, was different from the album version - which was produced by Mike Spencer, and is a big favourite amongst fans. The accompanying video was directed by Adrian Moat.

Knight promoted the song by performing the song on Top of the Pops and sister show Top of the Pops Saturday.

== Background ==
During Knight's 100% Tour in 2010, she announced that she wrote "Gold" after a friend of Knight's told her that she thought we was 'gold'. Knight was then immediately inspired and sat down at a piano and then wrote the song. She dedicated the song to her friend on the album of which "Gold" appears: Who I Am and also whilst live.

== Track list ==
CD 1

1. "Gold" (single mix)
2. "Liquid Gold" (Mark Revel extended mix)
3. "Gold" (album version)
4. "Gold" (video)

CD 2

1. "Gold" (single mix)
2. "Same (As I Ever Was)" (Bump N Flex mix)
3. "Same (As I Ever Was)" (album version)

== Charts ==
Chart (2002)	Peak position
UK Hip Hop/R&B (OCC)	6
UK Singles (OCC)	27

== Personnel ==
- Written by Beverley Knight, Mike Spencer
- Single version mixed and produced by Mike 'Spike' Drake
- Album version recorded and produced by Mike Spencer
- All vocals performed and arranged by Beverley Knight
- Drums performed by YoYo, Real drums on album version performed by Shane Meehan
- Decks performed by DJ Pogo

Piano Martin Lister Drums Shane Meehan Bass Derek Mcyntyre Guitar Rob Harris

== See also ==
- Beverley Knight discography
