= Affirmation (Beverley Knight album) =

Studio album by Beverley Knight
- Released: 28 June 2004
- Length: 59:34
- Label: Parlophone
- Producers: Chris Braide; Guy Chambers; Richard Flack; Ghost; Jimmy Hogarth; Beverley Knight; DJ Munro; Peter-John Vettese

Beverley Knight chronology
Who I Am (2002)	Affirmation (2004)	Voice – The Best of Beverley Knight (2006)

Singles from Affirmation
- 1. "Come as You Are" Released: 21 June 2004; 2. "Not Too Late for Love" Released: 27 September 2004; 3. "Keep This Fire Burning" Released: 14 March 2005

Affirmation is the fourth studio album by British singer-songwriter Beverley Knight. It was released by Parlophone Records on 28 June 2004 in the United Kingdom. The album peaked at number 11 on the UK Albums Chart, while reaching number 83 in Switzerland. Affirmation was certified silver by the British Phonographic Industry (BPI) on 2 July 2004, less than a week after the album was released, and had reached gold status by December 2004. It features three hit singles, "Come As You Are", "Not Too Late for Love" and "Keep This Fire Burning", which all entered the top 40 of the UK Singles Chart.

== Reception ==
Professional ratings
Review scores
Source	Rating
AllMusic	3.5/5 stars
The Independent	3/5 stars
Yahoo! Music UK	9/10

Affirmation received generally mixed to positive reviews. AllMusic editor Jon O'Brien rated the album three and a half stars out of five and remarked that "Affirmation clearly has one eye on dominating the airwaves." He found that "inevitably, with the attempt to cover several bases, [it] may alienate fans of her more soulful first two records [...] But overall, there are enough gems on here to suggest that Affirmation may achieve the commercial success it so obviously craves." Angus Batey from Yahoo! Music UK called Affirmation a "testament to her belief in, and considerable ability to wield, the power of a good song."

== Track listing ==
Affirmation – Standard edition
No.	Title	Writer(s)	Producer(s)	Length
1.	"Come As You Are"	Beverley Knight; Guy Chambers	Chambers	3:43
2.	"Not Too Late for Love"	Knight; Chris Braide	Braide	4:19
3.	"First Time"	Knight; Chris Martin	Jimmy Hogarth	4:42
4.	"Straight Jacket"	Knight; Peter-John Vettese; Felix Howard	Vettese	3:26
5.	"Keep This Fire Burning"	Robyn; Remee; Ulf Lindström; Johan Ekhé	Ghost	3:53
6.	"No One Ever Loves In Vain"	Knight; Chambers	Chambers; Richard Flack	3:23
7.	"Affirmation"	Knight; Chambers	Chambers; Flack	3:25
8.	"Supasonic"	Knight; Hogarth	Hogarth	3:47
9.	"Tea & Sympathy"	Knight; Braide	Braide	3:57
10.	"Below My Radar"	Knight; Howard; Vettese	Vettese	4:47
11.	"Under the Same Sun"	Knight; Chambers	Chambers; Flack	3:43
12.	"Till I See Ya"	Knight; Vettese; Michelle Escoffery	Vettese	3:26
13.	"Salvador" (featuring Al Di Meola)	Knight; Munro Craig; David Nicholson	DJ Munro	4:35
14.	"Remember Me"	Knight	Knight	3:50
15.	"Fatal Factor" (hidden track)	Knight; Craig	DJ Munro	3:42
Total length:				59:34

== Main personnel ==
- Beverley Knight – vocals, production, backing vocals, producer, piano
- Guy Chambers – piano, keyboards, production, bass guitar, arrangement, organ, synthesizer, clavinet, acoustic guitar
- Chris Braide – production, keyboards, guitars, backing vocals
- Dominic Glover – trumpet
- Richard Flack – drum programming, production, arrangement, engineer, mixer
- Phil Spalding – electric guitar, bass guitar
- Jimmy Hogarth – guitar, production, programming, percussion
- Andy Ross – saxophone
- Julian Burdock – electric guitar
- Sam Dixon – bass guitar
- David Nicholson – keyboards, programming, guitar
- Jeremy Stacey – drums
- Paul Reid – guitar
- Frank Ricotti – percussion
- Peter John Vettese – drums, guitar, production, programming
- Ghost – production
- Martin Slattery – piano
- Al Di Meola – guitar
- Ashley Kingsley – keyboards, electric piano
- Paul Stanborough – additional acoustic guitar
- DJ Munro – production
- Ian Thomas – drums
- Billie Godfrey – backing vocals
- Bryan Chambers – backing vocals

== Charts ==
Chart (2004)	Peak position
Scottish Albums (Official Charts)	15
Swiss Albums (Schweizer Hitparade)	83
UK Albums (Official Charts)	11
UK R&B Albums (Official Charts)	11

== Certifications ==
Region	Certification	Certified units/sales
United Kingdom (BPI)	Gold	100,000^{^}
^{^} Shipments figures based on certification alone.
