= Music City Soul =

Studio album by Beverley Knight
- Released: 7 May 2007
- Recorded: October 2006 (Nashville, Tennessee)
- Genre: Soul; gospel
- Length: 55:07
- Label: Parlophone
- Producer: Mark Nevers; Paul Reid; Peter Vale; Eg White

Beverley Knight chronology
Voice – The Best of Beverley Knight (2006)	Music City Soul (2007)	The Collection (2009)

Singles from Music City Soul
- 1. "No Man's Land" Released: 30 April 2007; 2. "After You" Released: 2 July 2007; 3. "The Queen of Starting Over" Released: 15 October 2007

Music City Soul is the fifth studio album by British singer-songwriter Beverley Knight. It was released on Parlophone Records on 7 May 2007 in the United Kingdom. The album contains the singles "No Man's Land", "After You" and "The Queen of Starting Over", and features Ronnie Wood on a number of tracks. The album became Knight's second highest charting album in the UK, peaking at number eight.

== Background ==
The majority of Music City Soul was recorded and produced by Mark Nevers at The Beech House studio in Nashville, Tennessee in the United States in just five days in late October 2006. All the songs on the album were written beforehand the previous summer and then recorded back to back in the studio with an array of different musicians. The intention was to create an organic sound reminiscent of classic 1960s soul albums that epitomised releases by artists such as Aretha Franklin, Sam Cooke and Al Green, who had influenced Knight as a child. The album was titled Music City Soul to reflect the fact that Knight has returned to her soul and gospel roots. It was also intended to pay homage to Nashville, the city it was recorded in, which is often referred to as 'The Music City' due to its rich musical heritage.

== Crtitical reception ==
Professional ratings
Review scores
Source	Rating
Allmusic	3/5 stars
The Mirror	4/5 stars
The Independent	4/5 stars
London Lite	4/5 stars
The Times	3/5 stars
The Guardian	3/5 stars
Digital Spy	4/5 stars
The Belfast Telegraph	4/5 stars
Virgin Media	4/5 stars
Mojo	4/5 stars

Music City Soul received generally mixed to positive reviews from music critics. Allmusic editor Jon O'Brien rated the album three stars out of five and remarked that "whether it's a knee-jerk response to the disappointing sales of her 'all-bases-covered' predecessor, or a genuine affectionate homage to the likes of Al Green, Sam Cooke, and Aretha Franklin, its 15 tracks are undeniably and authentically old-school, thanks to Mark Nevers' organic production, Knight's full-throttled soulful vocals, and an inspired choice of collaborators and song choices."

== Track listing ==
Music City Soul – Standard edition
No.	Title	Writer(s)	Producer(s)	Length
1.	"Every Time You See Me Smile"	Beverley Knight; Martin Brammer	Mark Nevers	4:08
2.	"Ain't That a Lot of Love"	William Dean Parker; Homer Banks	Nevers	2:43
3.	"After You"	Peter Vale; M. Leeson	Nevers	4:08
4.	"No Man's Land"	Knight; Eg White; Jimmy Hogarth	White	3:30
5.	"The Queen of Starting Over"	Vale	Nevers	3:47
6.	"Black Butta"	Knight; Guy Chambers	Nevers	3:40
7.	"Saviour"	Knight; Chambers	Nevers	2:58
8.	"Time Is on My Side"	Norman Meade	Nevers	3:33
9.	"Why Me, Why You, Why Now"	Knight; Brammer	Nevers	3:55
10.	"Tell Me I'm Wrong"	Knight; Brammer	Nevers	3:49
11.	"Trade It Up"	Knight; Brammer	Nevers	3:37
12.	"Rock Steady"	Aretha Franklin	Paul Reid	3:57

Bonus Tracks
No.	Title	Writer(s)	Producer(s)	Length
13.	"Uptight"	Knight; Jimmy Hogarth	Nevers	3:15
14.	"Back to You"	Knight; Craig Wiseman	Nevers	4:15
15.	"After You" (Radio Edit)	Vale; Leeson	Vale	3:59
Total length:				55:07

== Personnel ==
- Paul Bruce – bass
- Paul Burch – percussion and acoustic guitar
- Jamal Carter – backing vocals
- Bryan Chambers – backing vocals
- Janice Coeder – backing vocals
- Pete Cummings – electric guitar
- Ann McCrary – backing vocals
- Brian Kotzur – drums
- Duane Denison – electric guitar
- Alex Garnett – saxophone
- Billy Godfrey – backing vocals
- Carlos Hercules – drums
- Jimmy Hogarth – guitar
- James Long – electric guitar
- Derrick Lee – piano, keyboards
- Daniel Marsden – trumpet
- Louise Marsden – backing vocals
- Mark Nevers – engineering, production
- Paul Reide – guitar
- Luke Smith – Hammond B3 organ
- Bunt Stafford Clark – mastering
- Nichol Thomsom – trombone
- Stewart Trotman – Fender Rhodes
- Eg White – instruments
- Bobby Woods – piano, keyboards
- Ronnie Wood - guitar on "Every Time You See Me Smile", "Ain't That a Lot of Love" and "Black Butta"

== Charts ==
Chart (2007)	Peak position
Scottish Albums (OCC)	11
Swiss Albums (Schweizer Hitparade)	86
UK Albums (OCC)	8
UK Album Downloads (OCC)	11
UK R&B Albums (OCC)	3

== Certifications ==
Region	Certification	Certified units/sales
United Kingdom (BPI)	Silver	60,000^{^}
^{^} Shipments figures based on certification alone.
