= Shoulda Woulda Coulda =

2002 single by Beverley Knight

Single by Beverley Knight

from the album Who I Am
- Released: 25 February 2002
- Length: 3:32
- Label: Parlophone
- Songwriters: Beverley Knight; Craig Wiseman
- Producers: Mike Spencer; Tony Briscoe

Beverley Knight singles chronology
"Get Up!" (2001)	"Shoulda Woulda Coulda" (2002)	"Gold" (2002)

Alternative covers
- UK CD: 2 cover

"Shoulda Woulda Coulda" is a song by English singer Beverley Knight, released as the second single from her third studio album, Who I Am (2002). Written about the breakup of her long-term relationship because she decided to put her career first, the song became Knight's first top-10 single in the United Kingdom, peaking at number 10 on the UK Singles Chart and topping the UK R&B Singles Chart.

== Music video ==
The song's music video was shot in the Hout Bay area of Cape Town, South Africa, and directed by Douglas Avery. The location for the video was of special significance to Knight. She had visited previously in connection with her charity work in bringing awareness to HIV in South Africa. It was also the location of the video to her single "No Man's Land", released in 2007.

== Track listings ==
UK CD1

1. "Shoulda Woulda Coulda" (original mix)
2. "Shoulda Woulda Coulda" (featuring Know ?uestion) (Blacksmith R&B rub)
3. "Shoulda Woulda Coulda" (D'N'D on da Floor mix)
4. "Shoulda Woulda Coulda" (video)

UK CD2

1. "Shoulda Woulda Coulda" (original mix)
2. "Shoulda Woulda Coulda" (live version)
3. "Special Kinda Cool"

UK cassette single

1. "Shoulda Woulda Coulda" (original mix)
2. "Shoulda Woulda Coulda" (featuring Know ?uestion) (Blacksmith R&B rub)
3. "Shoulda Woulda Coulda" (Agent Sumo mix)

== Personnel ==
Personnel are lifted from the UK CD2 liner notes.

- Beverley Knight – writing, vocals
- Craig Wiseman – writing
- Mike Spencer – production
- Tony Briscoe – production
- Mike 'Spike' Drake – additional production, mixing
- Jack Clark – mixing assistance
- YoYo – additional programming

== Charts ==
Chart (2002)	Peak position
Belgium (Ultratip Bubbling Under Flanders)	10
Belgium (Ultratip Bubbling Under Wallonia)	18
Europe (Eurochart Hot 100)	60
Netherlands (Single Top 100)	81
Scottish Singles Sales (Official Charts)	13
Switzerland (Schweizer Hitparade)	57
UK Singles (Official Charts)	10
UK Hip Hop/R&B (Official Charts)	1

== Certifications ==
Region	Certification	Certified units/sales
United Kingdom (BPI)	Silver	200,000^{‡}
^{‡} Sales+streaming figures based on certification alone.

== Release history ==
Region	Date	Format(s)	Label(s)	Ref.
United Kingdom	25 February 2002	CD; cassette	Parlophone	
Australia	16 September 2002	CD	Parlophone	

== See also ==
- Beverley Knight discography
