= Flavour of the Old School =

Single by Beverley Knight

from the album The B-Funk
- Released: 27 March 1995; 9 October 1995 (re-release)
- Recorded: 1994
- Genre: Swingbeat
- Length: 4:06 (radio/video version); 4:45 (album/rap version)
- Label: Dome Records
- Songwriters: Neville Thomas, Pule Pheto, Beverley Knight
- Producers: Neville Thomas, Pule Pheto

Beverley Knight singles chronology
"Flavour of the Old School" (1995)	"Down for the One" (1995)

Music video
- "Flavour of the Old School" on YouTube
"Down for the One" (1995)	"Flavour of the Old School (re-release)" (1995)	"Moving On Up (on the Right Side)" (1996)

Alternative cover
- UK re-release single cover

'"Flavour of the Old School"' is a song by British R&B recording artist Beverley Knight, released as her debut single from her first album, The B-Funk (1995). The track, which peaked at number fifty on the UK Singles Chart when it was released in March 1995, was accompanied by a low budget music video that saw Knight in the recording studio singing directly into the camera. It was re-released however in October 1995, supported by a new video and strong support from urban radio. The song went on to become Knight's first top 40 single, peaking at number thirty-three in the official UK Singles Chart. The song later reappeared on the b-side of Knight's 1999 single "Made it Back". The video is frequently shown in rotation on MTV Base.

== Critical reception ==
In his weekly UK chart commentary for Dotmusic, James Masterton described the song as "an interesting if unexciting piece of R&B." Caroline Sullivan from The Guardian felt that "floor-fillers", like the "deliriously retronuevo single [...] pump up the hip-hop-based grooves while retaining the gospel-boogie feel of modern UK soul." A reviewer from Music & Media wrote, "Everything sho' is funky here. Knight knows her classics from Rose Royce to Chaka Khan, but despite the title she isn't deaf for the latest developments in new jill swing. Have a taste of it." Ralph Tee from Music Week's RM Dance Update said, "Every now and again the UK soul scene comes up with something that blows everyone away, and this time it's Beverly Knight with this amazing vocal debut on a chunky, full-on swing cut good enough to rival any US production." Another editor, James Hamilton, declared it as a "plaintive Janet Jackson-ish sweetly cooed jiggling funky hip hop soul jogger".

== Track listings ==
=== Original release ===
CD:

1. "Flavour of the Old School" (radio version) 4:06
2. "Flavour of the Old School" (featuring Rapro) (album version) 4:45
3. "Flavour of the Old School" (Full Flava remix) 4:48
4. "Promise You Forever" 5:51

=== Re-release ===
CD:

1. "Flavour of the Old School" (radio version) 4:06
2. "Flavour of the Old School" (2B3 New Flava mix) 4:31
3. "Flavour of the Old School" (featuring Rapro) (hip hop mix) 4:09
4. "U've Got It" 4:34

== Charts ==
Chart (1995)	Peak positions
France (SNEP)	40
Scotland (OCC)	92
UK Singles (OCC) (original release)	50
UK Singles (OCC) (re-release)	33
UK Dance (OCC)	13
UK R&B (OCC)	5
UK Club Chart (Music Week)	40

== Personnel ==
- Written by Beverley Knight, Neville Thomas and Pule Pheto
- Produced by Neville Thomas and Pule Pheto
- All vocals performed by Beverley Knight
