= Get Up! (Beverley Knight song) =

Single by Beverley Knight

from the album Who I Am
- Released: 15 October 2001
- Recorded: 2001
- Genre: R&B; Soul
- Length: 3:47
- Label: Parlophone
- Songwriter(s): Beverley Knight; Derrick Joshua; Derrick Martin
- Producer(s): BJ; Mike Soul

Beverley Knight singles chronology
"Sista Sista" (1999)	"Get Up!" (2001)	"Shoulda Woulda Coulda" (2002)

Alternative cover
- CD 2 cover

Audio sample
- A 23-second long sample of Get Up!: file; help

"Get Up!" is a song by Beverley Knight, taken from her third studio album, Who I Am. The track was released on 15 October 2001. It was showcased with a performance at the 2001 MOBO Awards.

The single became Knight's third top 20 hit in Britain when it debuted and peaked at number seventeen upon its release.

== Chart performance ==
On 17 November 2001, the single would debut at number seventeen on the UK Singles Chart. In its second week, it would drop 11 places, charting at number twenty-eight. In the next two weeks afterwards, it would drop further, charting at number 49 and 72 respectively, before going out of the chart entirely.

Get Up! would re-entry the chart twice. On the 29th of December that year, it would reappear on the chart at number 90, before going out again. However, on 12 January 2002, the single would appear at number 78. A week later, it would drop four places, before dropping off the chart entirely.

The song would fare off much better on the R&B chart there, spending a week in the top ten, at number seven. It would spend eleven weeks in the top 40, as well as on the chart entirely.

The single would also achieve minor success in Scotland, peaking at number 42 there.

== Music video ==
The accompanying promo video was directed by Jason Smith.

== Track listing ==
- UK CD 1
1. "Get Up!"
2. "Get Up!" (Middle Row Mix)
3. "Get Up!" (So Solid Crew Mix)
- UK CD 2
1. "Get Up!"
2. "Never Too Late"
3. "What If?"

== Credits and personnel ==
- Beverley Knight – lyrics, vocals, initial production
- Derrick Joshua – lyrics, initial production
- Derrick Martin – lyrics, initial production
- BJ – production
- Mike Soul – production
- Mike 'Spike' Drake – mixing
- Jeff Knowler – assistant

== Charts ==
Chart (2001)	Peak position
Scotland (OCC)	42
UK Singles (OCC)	17
UK Hip Hop/R&B (OCC)	7

=== Year-end charts ===
Chart (2001)	Position
UK Urban (Music Week)	13
