= Who I Am (Beverley Knight album) =

Studio album by Beverley Knight
- Released: 11 March 2002
- Length: 51:36
- Label: Parlophone
- Producers: Tony Briscoe; D'Influence; Dodge; Mike "Spike" Drake; Jerry Duplessis; Colin Emmanuel; Derrick Joshua; Beverley Knight; Derrick Martin; James Poyser; Mike Spencer; Wyclef Jean

Beverley Knight chronology
Prodigal Sista (1998)	Who I Am (2002)	Affirmation (2004)

Singles from Affirmation
- 1. "Get Up!" Released: 5 November 2001; 2. "Shoulda Woulda Coulda" Released: 25 February 2002; 3. "Gold" Released: 24 June 2002; 4. "Shape of You (Reshaped)" Released: 3 March 2003

Who I Am is the third studio album by British singer-songwriter Beverley Knight. It was released by Parlophone Records on 29 March 2002 in the United Kingdom. The album entered the UK Albums Chart at number 7, becoming Knight's first top ten album. It went on to be certified gold by the British Phonographic Industry (BPI), and earned Knight several awards nominations, most notably the prestigious Mercury Music Prize in 2002, and Best British Female and Best Urban Act at the 2003 BRIT Awards.

== Critical reception ==
Professional ratings
Review scores
Source	Rating
AllMusic	4/5 stars
entertainment.ie	4/5 stars
The Guardian	4/5 stars
The Independent	4/5 stars
Yahoo! Music UK	6/10

Who I Am received generally favorable reviews from music critics. Allmusic editor Jon O'Brien rated the album four out of five stars, calling it "a well-produced collection of contemporary R&B songs that is just as confident and self-assured as her more celebrated US contemporaries." He found that "overall, Who I Am is still a colossal leap. After seven years of being an also-ran, Knight now has the material to back up her world-class vocals. The big time surely awaits." In her review for The Guardian, Caroline Sullivan wrote that "every song bubbles with the kind of expensive, polished confidence that often eludes British contenders, and she sings with the poise of an artist at the height of her powers [...] The one thing missing from this luscious album is a killer single, which may keep it from achieving the success it deserves." The Independent found that "the album as a whole [is] marked by an impressive restraint that's far more persuasive than the ghastly histrionics of her American peers."

== Track listing ==
Who I Am – Standard edition
No.	Title	Writer(s)	Producer(s)	Length
1.	"Get Up!"	Knight; Derrick Martin; Derrick Joshua	BJ; Mike Soul	3:46
2.	"Shoulda Woulda Coulda"	Knight; Craig Wiseman	Mike Spencer; Tony Briscoe	3:32
3.	"Shape of You"	Knight; Wiseman	D'Influence	4:26
4.	"Fallen Soldier"	Knight; A. Clark	Mike "Spike" Drake	3:20
5.	"Beautiful Contradiction" (duet with Musiq Soulchild)	Knight; Steve Francis	James Poyser; Che Pope	4:45
6.	"Hurricane Jane"	Knight; Poyser; Pope	Poyser; Pope	4:07
7.	"Same (As I Ever Was)"	Knight; Colin Emmanuel; Eric Appapoulay	Emmanuel	3:36
8.	"Whatever's Clever"	Knight; Francis	Knight; Briscoe	3:57
9.	"Ambition (It All Comes 2 U)"	Knight; Martin Brammer; James McMillan	Dodge	3:20
10.	"Bestseller Mystery"	Knight; Martin; Joshua	Knight; Martin; Joshua	5:13
11.	"Gold"	Knight; Spencer	Drake	4:52
12.	"Who I Am" (hidden track)	Knight; Thom Schuyler	Schuyler	1:45
13.	"Shoulda Woulda Coulda (Philly Mix)" (hidden track)	Knight; Wiseman	Spencer; Briscoe	4:57
Total length:				51:36

Reissue bonus track
No.	Title	Writer(s)	Producer(s)	Length
14.	"Shape of You (Re-shaped)" (featuring Wyclef Jean & Hollywood)	Knight; Wiseman; Jean; Duplessis	D'Influence; Jean; Jerry Duplessis	3:46
Total length:				55:22

== Charts ==
=== Weekly charts ===
Chart (2002)	Peak position
Scottish Albums (Official Charts)	17
Swiss Albums (Schweizer Hitparade)	29
UK Albums (Official Charts)	7
UK R&B Albums (Official Charts)	1

=== Year-end charts ===
Chart (2002)	Position
UK Albums (OCC)	86

== Certifications ==
Certifications for Who I Am
Region	Certification	Certified units/sales
United Kingdom (BPI)	Gold	100,000^{^}
^{^} Shipments figures based on certification alone.
