= Come as You Are (Beverley Knight song) =

2004 single by Beverley Knight

Single by Beverley Knight

from the album Affirmation
- B-side: "Shoulda Woulda Coulda"; "Relate"
- Released: 21 June 2004
- Studio: Townhouse, Orgasmatron (London)
- Length: 3:45
- Label: Parlophone
- Songwriters: Beverley Knight; Guy Chambers
- Producers: Guy Chambers; Richard Flack

Beverley Knight singles chronology
"Shape of You (Reshaped)" (2003)	"Come as You Are" (2004)	"Not Too Late for Love" (2004)

"Come as You Are" is the lead single from English singer Beverley Knight's fourth studio album, Affirmation (2004). Co-written by Guy Chambers, it was Knight's second UK top-10 hit and is her highest-charting song in the United Kingdom, peaking at number nine on the UK Singles Chart. It also briefly charted in Germany, reaching number 100.

== Music video ==
The promotional video for "Come as You Are" was directed by J.T and was Knight's most expensive. It is set on a futuristic space station and involves her performing with her band to a large crowd.

== Track listings ==
UK CD1

1. "Come as You Are"
2. "Shoulda Woulda Coulda"

UK CD2

1. "Come as You Are"
2. "Relate"
3. "Come as You Are" (JD remix)
4. "Come as You Are" (video)

UK 12-inch single

A. "Come as You Are" (JD remix)
B. "Come as You Are"

== Credits and personnel ==
Credits are adapted from the European CD1 liner notes.

Studios

- Recorded at Townhouse Studios and Orgasmatron Studio (London, UK)
- Mixed at Mayfair Studios (London)

Personnel

- Beverley Knight – writing, vocals
- Guy Chambers – writing, production, arrangement
- Richard Flack – production, engineering, mixing
- Paul Stanborough – engineering assistance
- Traffic – artwork design
- Deirdre O'Callaghan – photography

== Charts ==
Chart (2004)	Peak position
Germany (GfK)	100
Scottish Singles Sales (Official Charts)	11
UK Singles (Official Charts)	9
UK Hip Hop/R&B (Official Charts)	7
