= Beverley Knight =

British recording artist and stage actress (born 1973)

Beverley Knight MBE
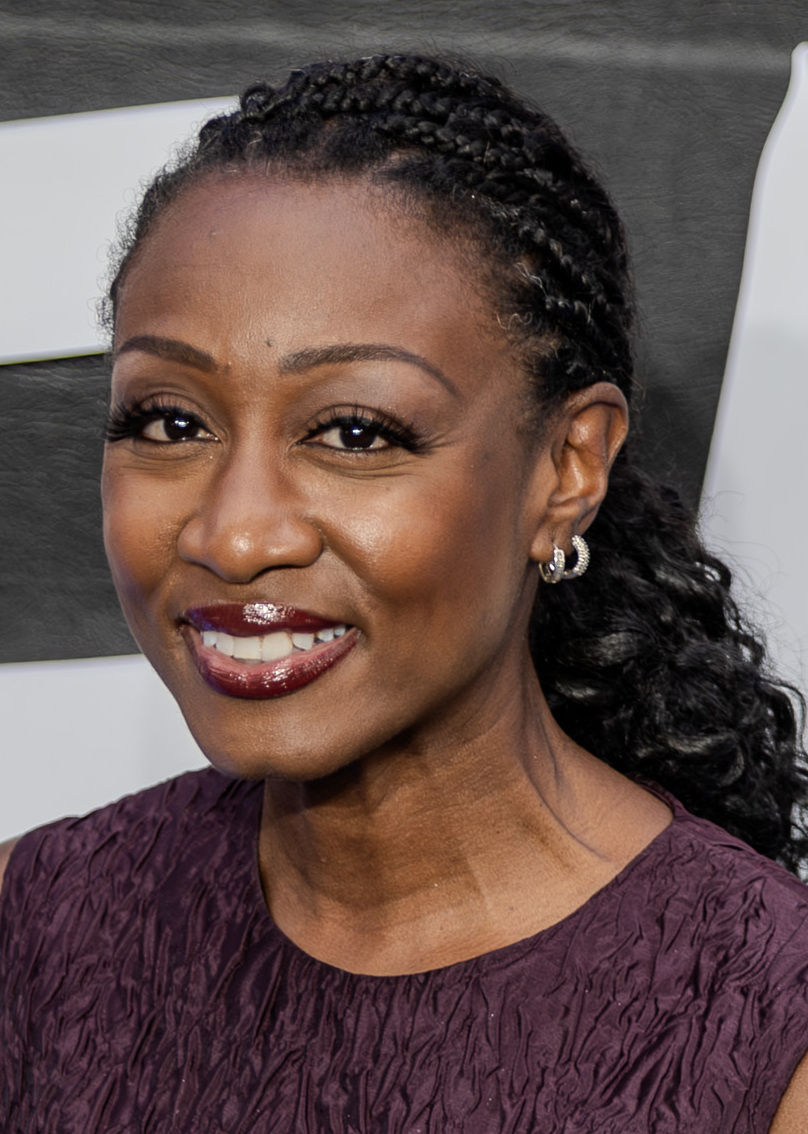
- Knight at the premiere of Caught Stealing, August 2025
- Born: Beverley Anne Smith; 22 March 1973 (age 53); Wolverhampton, England
- Occupations: Singer; songwriter; actress; radio personality
- Years active: 1994–present
- Spouse: James O'Keefe (m. 2012)
- Musical career
- Genres: British soul; neo soul; R&B
- Instrument: Vocals
- Website: beverleyknight.com

Beverley Knight (born Beverley Anne Smith; 22 March 1973) is a British singer, songwriter, actress and radio personality. She released her first album, The B-Funk, in 1995. Heavily influenced by American soul music icons such as Sam Cooke and Aretha Franklin, Knight has released nine studio albums. Widely regarded as one of Britain's greatest soul singers, she is best known for her hit singles "Greatest Day", "Get Up!", "Shoulda Woulda Coulda", "Come as You Are" and "Keep This Fire Burning".

In 2006, Knight solidified her transition into the mainstream by starring in the BBC music TV series Just the Two of Us, a role she reprised in 2007. After releasing a platinum-selling compilation album in 2006, Knight went on to tour the UK with a reformed Take That. She has also hosted the BBC Radio 2 show, Beverley's Gospel Nights, which explored the origins and impact of gospel music. The show ran for six seasons until 2009 and included interviews with stars such as Michelle Williams and Shirley Caesar.

Knight is an ambassador for many charities such as Christian Aid and has travelled to areas affected by disease and poverty to help raise awareness. She is an active campaigner for anti-Aids organisations such as the Stop AIDS Campaign and The Terrence Higgins Trust and is also a vocal campaigner against homophobic lyrics in urban music. On Saturday, 15 August 2009, she performed live at the fourth annual UK Black Pride event in Regent's Park. On 4 December 2009, at the invitation of Sarah Jane Brown, wife of the then prime minister Gordon Brown, Knight performed the two songs "Shoulda Woulda Coulda" and "Gold" to an invited audience at 10 Downing Street in support of the White Ribbon Alliance for Safe Motherhood Million Mums charity. In January 2026, she publicly announced her role as ambassador for The Paul Reid Foundation Co-founded by Pauline and Liam Reid, the foundation is named in honour of Knight’s close friend, guitarist and musical director of more than 25 years. Launched on January 31, 2026, at The Park Regis Hotel, Its aim is to improve access to careers in music for financially disadvantaged aspiring artists. Knight said that it is vital to break down barriers through expert support and mentorship.

After more than a decade in the music industry, Knight was appointed a Member of the Order of the British Empire in 2006 in recognition of her contribution to British music. In September 2005, Knight was made an honorary Doctor of Music by the University of Wolverhampton. After receiving a host of awards, including three MOBO Awards, Knight was presented with a Lifetime Achievement Award in 2004 at the Urban Music Awards in London. Knight supported Prince during The Earth Tour: 21 Nights in London and also performed at the concert after parties.

In February 2008, Knight was flown to Los Angeles by Prince to perform at his prestigious post-Oscars party, at the singer's purple home, in front of and with A-list stars including Stevie Wonder. She received a standing ovation from stars including Quincy Jones, particularly for her rendition of "Rock Steady".

Knight sang at the London 2012 Paralympic Opening Ceremony. The performance was praised, and a recorded version by Knight reached No. 101 on iTunes, her first charting single since "Soul Survivor" and highest since "Beautiful Night" in 2010 and 2009, respectively. In 2016, Knight released her eighth studio album, Soulsville. In 2019, Knight celebrated 25 years in music with the release of the live album BK25 which was recorded with the Leo Green Orchestra. Knight's ninth studio album, The Fifth Chapter, was released in October 2023.

Knight has been nominated for two Laurence Olivier Awards for Best Actress in a Musical in 2015 and 2022 for her performances in Memphis and The Drifters Girl; she won in 2023, on her third nomination, the Best Supporting Actress in a Musical for Sylvia. Knight made her first foray into musical theatre in September 2013, replacing Heather Headley as Rachel Marron in The Bodyguard. In 2017, she made her pantomime debut at the Birmingham Hippodrome as the Fairy Godmother in Cinderella. In 2025, Knight portrayed Rosetta Tharpe in the stage production Marie & Rosetta at the Rose Theatre in Kingston upon Thames and the Minerva Theatre in Chichester.

== Early life and education ==
Knight attended Woodfield Infant and Junior Schools, and Highfields School in Wolverhampton. She was born to Jamaican parents and grew up in a strict Pentecostal household where church attendance was an important element in the life of the family. It was here that she began her singing career. "The first time I heard music would have been in church. My mum was often called upon: 'Come on sister Dolores. Lead us in song!' Singing was the most natural thing in the world. I thought, doesn't everybody's mum lead the congregation at church in song?" Knight sang in her local church throughout her childhood, and her musical education was continued at home where she was often exposed to gospel music. Because of her parents' religious beliefs, secular music was largely frowned upon, but artists such as Sam Cooke and Aretha Franklin played a big part in her childhood.

Knight began writing her own songs at the age of 13; however, it was not until she turned 17 that she began to take songwriting and performing seriously. She began performing the songs she had written on stage in local clubs in her home town. At the age of 19, she performed on the demo songs of Wolverhampton songwriter Westley Jones, who was signed to Dome publishing in London. Peter Robinson, the managing director of the company, impressed with her vocals, asked Westley Jones to introduce her. Robinson and Jones – who had discovered Knight through demo recordings – also came up with the stage name of Beverley Knight (from Smith) as Peter had also signed another demo vocalist of Jones' from Birmingham, calling her Fiona Day. She was adamant that her education should come first and that she should have something to fall back on, and so went to Cheltenham and Gloucester College of Higher Education (now the University of Gloucestershire) to study theology and philosophy.

== Career ==
=== 1994–2000: Early success ===
In late 1994, Knight signed a record deal with Dome Records, a small, independent label. Shortly after, she went into a studio to write and record her first album. The backbone of the project was produced by the London production trio 2B3, with additional beats provided by Don E (Knight's cousin), Ethnic Boyz and the hip-hop act Blak Twang. Klarmann/Weber, the German songwriter/producer team (Chaka Khan, Randy Crawford), also contributed two songs. The result was the album The B-Funk, – hailed by her record label as "the best British soul album ever" when it was released in November 1995. Knight went on to win two Black Music Awards in 1996 ("Best R&B Artist" and "Best Producer" for 2B3) and was named Best R&B Act by Blues and Soul magazine, beating a number of American stars. However, the album only peaked at number 145 on the UK albums chart. Several singles were released from the project, the biggest being "Flavour of the Old School", which peaked at number 33 in March 1996 when it was re-released.

In February 1997, Knight left Dome Records after disagreements, and signed a new four-album deal with EMI-controlled Parlophone. After returning to the studio with 2B3 and Don E and teaming up with new producers Dj Dodge and Carl McIntosh, Knight released her second album, Prodigal Sista, in August 1998. Peaking at number 42 in Britain, the commercial success of the album proved to be much greater than her first. The album sold 150,000 copies in Britain and was certified Gold in 1999. It contained five top-40 hits, the biggest of which were "Greatest Day", peaking at number 14, and the Dj Dodge-produced "Made It Back" featuring the US rap star Redman, which peaked at number 21.

Prodigal Sista was a big step forward in Knight's career. Q magazine called the album "a triumph not only of Knight's musical vision but also of the strength in her character", while The Times remarked, "Prodigal Sista is a joy to hear – her vocal and intricate self-devised and performed harmonies can make you catch your breath in wonderment." The album won three MOBO (Music of Black Origin) Awards, with "Made It Back" and "Greatest Day" winning Best R&B Act in 1998 and 1999 respectively, and Prodigal Sista winning the Best Album Award.

=== 2001–2005: Mainstream breakthrough ===
Throughout 2001 Knight returned to the recording studio to write and record her third studio album. She was accompanied by an array of writers and producers handpicked largely by Kevin and Bev from Britain and the United States, which included James Poyser, Che Guevara, Derrick Joshua & Derrick Martin, D'Influence, Mike Spencer and Colin Emmanuel. The result was Who I Am, released in March 2002. It was preceded by two singles, "Get Up!" and "Shoulda Woulda Coulda" – a first in that it introduced Knight to the world of Nashville and one of its most famous sons, Craig Wiseman, a giant in the country music business. This partnership became Knight's most successful single up to that point, peaking at number 10 on the UK Singles Chart. The success of the singles propelled the album to number seven on the album chart, making Who I Am her most commercially successful album to date. It was re-released with new versions of the singles "Gold" and "Shape of You (Reshaped)" and has sold 215,000 copies in Britain, earning a Gold sales certificate.

The critical response to Who I Am was largely positive, with The Guardian stating that "every song bubbles with the kind of expensive, polished confidence that often eludes British contenders, and she sings with the poise of an artist at the height of her powers", while the BBC remarked: "Who I Am marks a significant change in direction for this tenacious 28-year-old singer, signifying her own personal growth as a true artist and developing songwriter....on this her most personal work to date, she takes us on an intimate journey where she bares her soul with such raw honesty that you get the distinct impression a healing process is taking place". The album earned her two Brit Award nominations ("Best Female", "Best Urban Act") and was nominated for the Mercury Music Prize in 2002.

After touring Britain in 2002, Knight set about creating her fourth album and entered the studio in the summer of 2003. Without the architect of her most successful song in her camp her new A&R team attempted to appeal to a larger mainstream audience, enlisting the help of pop producers such as Guy Chambers and Peter-John Vettese as well as collaborating with R&B producers such as DJ Munro. The result was Affirmation, which was released on Parlophone in June 2004. The album entered the charts at number 11 and was preceded by the single "Come as You Are" – a rock/pop orientated song written with and produced by Chambers. The song marked a more mainstream pop sound that alienated Knight's largely urban fan base and the song was not well received by urban radio stations. Nevertheless, it became her biggest hit to date, peaking at number nine on the singles chart. The song was followed by two more singles, "Not Too Late for Love" and "Keep This Fire Burning", which helped boost album sales and resulted in the album being awarded a Gold sales certificate in December 2004.

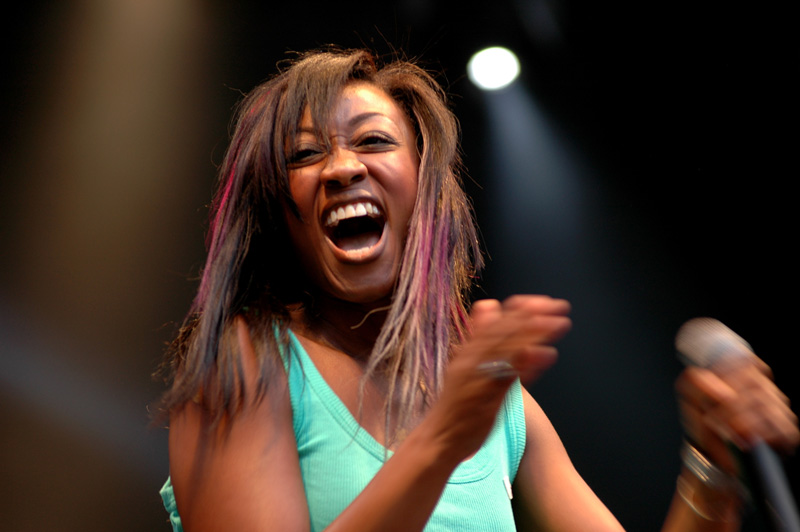
Knight performing in 2005

The themes running throughout the album, which were influenced by the events she had witnessed over the previous two years, marked a milestone in Knight's career as a lyricist. The main essence of the project was centred on Knight's relationship with Tyrone Jamison – a gay man whom she described as her "soulmate" and who died of an AIDS-related disease in 2003. Throughout the album, lyrics on tracks such as "Remember Me" ("One day we will be reunited, least I hope that is our destiny, so while you chill in the arms of angels, remember me, remember me") and "No One Ever Loves in Vain" reference her relationship with Jamison.

Compared to the praise of her previous albums, the critical response to Affirmation was mixed. The mainstream press such as The Guardian praised her for branching out, while the black music press such as The Voice and Blues and Soul accused Knight of selling out and being manipulated away from urban music by her record label, a claim she flatly denies: "Everything I've done musically has been completely me. I write my own songs so I'm not just a vocalist who can easily be dictated to."

=== 2006–2008: Consolidating success ===
In February 2006 Knight consolidated her move into the mainstream audience by appearing on BBC1 music show, Just the Two of Us. The show, featuring celebrities who duet with established singers, ran for two series and proved to be a relative disappointment in terms of audience figures – averaging between 15 and 25 percent audience shares. Nevertheless, it provided a platform for Knight to reach out to a bigger audience and demonstrate her talent by performing a different array of songs than she would otherwise be known for. Reaching out to new audiences was also a driving force behind Knight's decision to join Take That on their reunion arena tour. "Take That – The Ultimate Tour 06", which ran from April to July 2006, sold 270,000 tickets in less than four hours on sale at the box office and featured Knight as a support act.

In March 2006 Knight released her fifth album, a compilation set featuring the majority of her top forty UK singles entitled Voice – The Best of Beverley Knight. The album, which was certified Gold less than a month after its release, became her second highest charting of her career, when it entered the UK albums chart at number ten and rose to number nine a month later. It was preceded by the single "Piece of My Heart" – a cover of the Erma Franklin song made famous by Janis Joplin and entered the singles chart at number 16, spending 11 weeks inside the chart and becoming her longest-running chart single to date.

In October 2006, Knight recorded her fifth studio album, Music City Soul, in Nashville. Completed in less than five days, the album was released on 7 May 2007 and features collaborations with musicians such as Ronnie Wood and Scotty Moore. It spawned three singles, "No Man's Land", released on 16 April 2007, "After You", released on 2 July 2007, and "The Queen of Starting Over", released on 15 October 2007. This turned out to be her final album for Parlophone.

Between August and September 2007, Knight supported Prince during his residency at the O2 Arena and also performed at the concert after parties. As a result of this, she was also flown to perform at his Oscars party in front of A-list stars and got a standing ovation from stars such as Quincy Jones.

=== 2009–2010: Going independent and 100% ===
On 23 March 2009, Knight announced via her official web site that she had left Parlophone records after 11 years and would be releasing new material through her own label, Hurricane Records. Knight also announced that her sixth studio album would be released in summer 2009, having a more contemporary feel in comparison to previous retro soul album Music City Soul. New songwriters and producers associated with the project include Jimmy Jam and Terry Lewis (whose previous credits include Janet Jackson, Usher and Mariah Carey) and The Rural, along with previous collaborators Guy Chambers and DJ Munro.

On 31 March 2009, Knight confirmed that she would be releasing her sixth studio album in September through her own record label, Hurricane Records. In a video blog on her website she said that "for the past year, I've been writing for the record. I've been working with some new names and some old names for the album." She also confirmed that she is expecting to go on tour in support of the album later this year.

The album is called 100%. The first finished track revealed from the album was Knight's collaboration with US producers Jimmy Jam and Terry Lewis, titled "Every Step". The lead single from the album was "Beautiful Night", co-written with Amanda Ghost and produced by The Rural. The album was released the same week on 7 September 2009 and entered the UK Albums Chart at number 17. The second single, "In Your Shoes", premiered on BBC 1Xtra on 5 October. The radio remix features UK rapper Chipmunk.

In 2010, Knight made six guest appearances as a panellist on ITVs flagship show Loose Women.

=== 2011–2016: Theatre, Soul UK, and Soulsville ===
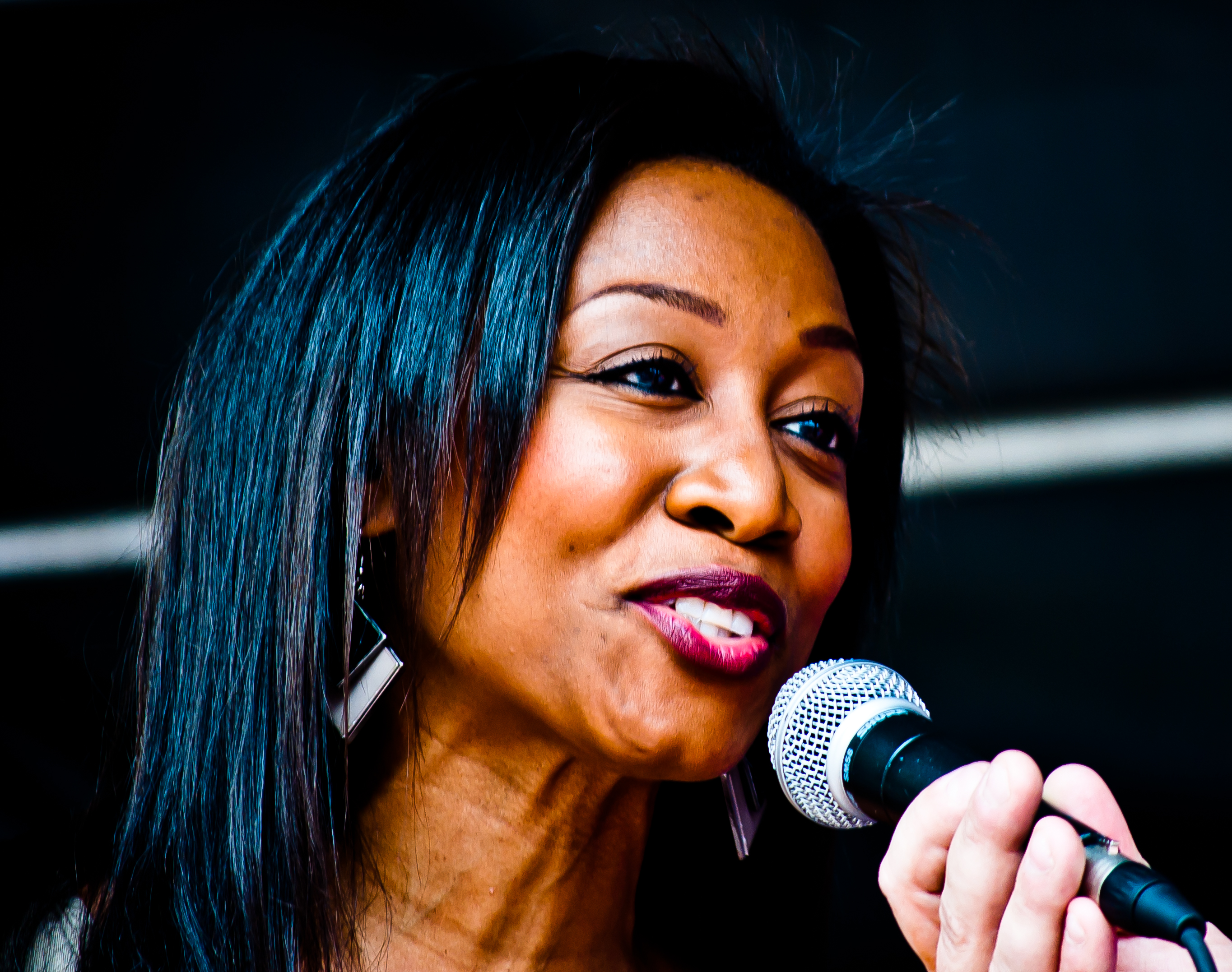
Knight, 2011

In March 2011, Knight announced in that she would be releasing her seventh studio album later that year and that it would be a collection of British soul covers. She also announced a one-off gig to be held at Porchester Hall, London, which would be filmed for her first live DVD, to be included with the album release. Knight confirmed the album would be entitled Soul UK at the Porchester Hall show.

The first single to be released from the album was "Mama Used to Say", a hit single originally recorded by Junior Giscombe. The single was released on 27 June 2011, with the album following on 4 July. The album was the highest new entry on the UK albums chart in its week of release, peaking at number 13. Three further singles were released from Soul UK, "Cuddly Toy" (originally by Roachford), "One More Try" (originally by George Michael) and "Round and Around" (originally by Jaki Graham). Other artists whose songs were covered on Soul UK include: Soul II Soul; Loose Ends; Omar; Jamiroquai, with whom she had previously recorded the song "Main Vain" with; Princess; Lewis Taylor; Heatwave; Freeez; and Young Disciples.

In 2013, Knight appeared on the 2013 album from The Overtones, entitled Saturday Night at the Movies, which reached the UK albums chart top 5. Knight featured on the song "Hit the Road, Jack".

On 9 September 2013, Knight took over the role of Rachel Marron (played by Whitney Houston in the original 1992 film) from performer Heather Headley in the musical adaptation of The Bodyguard. Knight was nominated for Best Takeover in a Role at the Whatsonstage.com Awards as a result. Her run performing the role finished on 31 May 2014.

On 21 February 2014, it was confirmed that Knight would star in the new West End production of Memphis at the Shaftesbury Theatre, opening on 23 October 2014, following previews from 9 October 2014. In January 2015 producers announced that Knight would extend her performing in Memphis until July 2015.

In 2015, it was announced that she would play Grizabella in the 2015 revival of Cats at the London Palladium. She performed a song from Cats as part of the 2015 Royal Variety Performance.

On 27 October 2015, it was announced that East West Records had signed Knight to release her eighth studio album, Soulsville, which was released on 10 June 2016. The album includes a duet with Jamie Cullum and features covers of classic soul songs by William Bell and Judy Clay, Big Mama Thornton, Sam & Dave, Ann Peebles and Ben E. King, as well as some original tracks co-written by Knight. Upon release, Soulsville reached the Top 10 in the UK Albums Chart and the Scottish Albums Chart.

Knight returned to the West End in The Bodyguard musical on 15 July 2016 for a limited six-month run.

=== 2017–2024: BK25, Sylvia, The Fifth Chapter, Sister Act ===
Knight was one of the guest artists at a BBC Prom in 2017, celebrating the soul music of Stax Records. Alongside host Jools Holland, his Orchestra, James Morrison, Ruby Turner and Sir Tom Jones, the show also featured some of Stax's greatest living artists (William Bell, Booker T. Jones, Steve Cropper, Sam Moore and Eddie Floyd). Knight performed five times during the concert: "Sweet Soul Music" (with Jones and Morrison and again with the whole ensemble), "B-A-B-Y", duetted with Bell on "Private Number" and Moore on "Hold On, I'm Comin'".

In 2017, Knight teamed up with British singer Cassidy Janson and American actress Amber Riley to form a musical theatre supergroup, known collectively as the "Leading Ladies". Their debut album, Songs from the Stage, was released on 17 November 2017 and features covers songs from Cats, Beautiful and Rent among others.

In 2019, Knight was announced to star as Faye Treadwell, the manager of The Drifters, in the new West End-bound musical The Drifters Girl. Due to the COVID-19 pandemic, the production received a delayed opening at the Garrick Theatre in November 2021, following a limited run at the Theatre Royal, Newcastle. She received her second Olivier Award nomination for Best Actress in a Musical in 2022.

On 8 November 2019, Knight released a live album, BK25 which was recorded in May 2019 at the Royal Festival Hall in London with the Leo Green Orchestra. The albums celebrates Knight's 25 years of music. During 2020, Beverley was approached by Pink Flamingo Films to sing the theme tune to British Indie Christmas film "The Loss Adjuster". The song "A Christmas Wish" was released during November accompanied by several TV appearances from Beverley and a multi award winning video to the song, shot in the stunning but deserted Noel Coward Theatre, to remind us how Covid had shut down live performances. The song releases each year in the run up to Christmas. On 13 November 2020, Knight performed as part of BBC Children in Need 2020 singing Pink Floyd's "Wish You Were Here". Knight performed a concert with a small audience at the London Palladium in Summer 2021, which aimed test new measures limiting the spread of COVID-19 in theatres. From February 2022, Knight was part of the judging panel on ITV's Starstruck, a revived and reformatted version of Stars in Their Eyes.

In October 2022, it was announced that Knight would be returning to the West End to star as Emmeline Pankhurst in a hip-hop inspired musical, Sylvia, based on the Suffragette movement and Sylvia Pankhurst's life. Knight appeared on a 13 January 2023 episode of The Graham Norton Show to promote the production. Sylvia ran from January to April 2023 at The Old Vic.

In June 2023, Knight announced the release of a new studio album, titled The Fifth Chapter, scheduled for release in September 2023. The album's lead single, "Last One On My Mind", was released 9 June 2023. The album's second single, "Systematic Overload", was released on 17 August 2023. On 16 September 2023, Knight performed the single, among her previous hits, on stage at the Radio 2 in the Park, which was held at Victoria Park, Leicester. The Fifth Chapter was released to positive reviews on 29 September 2023, and charted at number 39 on the UK Albums Chart. To further promote the albun, Knight performed "I'm on Fire" on Strictly Come Dancing on 16 October 2023.

In 2024 Knight starred in the UK West End stage version of Sister Act, to positive reviews by critics. A live cast recording was released on 23 December 2024.

=== 2025: Marie and Rosetta ===
In 2025, Knight will be portraying Rosetta Tharpe in the stage production Marie & Rosetta at the Rose Theatre in Kingston upon Thames and the Minerva Theatre in Chichester.

In October 2025, Knight announced a UK tour, Born To Perform, which will commence in June 2026, with support from Gabriella Cilmi.

== Creativity and influences ==
As Knight grew up in a Pentecostal environment of Jamaican descent, music – especially gospel music – became a staple part of her childhood. She entered the gospel choir of her local church at just four years of age and eventually became the musical director before she left in her late teens. Her musical education continued at home, where her family would often sing together around the piano and listen to music from their favourite gospel and soul artists such as Sam Cooke.

In 2005, Knight revisited her childhood when she hosted Beverley's Gospel Nights, a BBC Radio 2 series exploring gospel music. Featuring interviews with artists such as Shirley Caesar, Percy Sledge and Destiny's Child stars Kelly Rowland and Michelle Williams, the six-part series explored the roots of gospel music and the impact it had upon the black community. Such was the success of the show that a second six-part series was commissioned and began in March 2006 and featured new interviews with artists such as Candi Staton, David McAlmont and Marvin Winans. Knight's interview technique and her ability to get her guests to open up and discuss issues in their personal lives such as domestic violence and depression received favourable reviews and led the Radio Times to comment "Knight's passion for the music is obvious – but so is her warmth, which makes her a rarity among interviewers."

The first artist to make an impact upon Knight was one of the true founders of contemporary gospel and soul music, Sam Cooke. Despite his untimely death in 1964, his music endured and became a staple part of Knight's childhood:

My mother played Sam Cooke and he was the first voice I ever heard on record. His was the first voice that directly had a big impact on me, vocally. He still makes me cry. He'd take the very simple Bible stories that I grew up with and just make them into a two-and-a-half-minute song and yet with an intensity and a passion that the world had never heard before. He really was a major influence on my life.

The impact of Cooke can be seen throughout Knight's career as she has often performed and recorded Cooke classics, the most notable of which is "A Change Is Gonna Come". The track, which came to exemplify the civil rights movement in the 1960s, has featured in many of Knight's live performances (usually with the aid of the London Community Gospel Choir) and she even recorded a studio version with musician Jools Holland, which featured on his Small World, Big Band Volume 2 album.

Another major influence in Knight's childhood was Aretha Franklin. Besides leading a tribute to Franklin at the BBC's Music of the Millennium concert in 1999, Knight has recorded several of Franklin's tracks, most notably "Do Right Woman, Do Right Man" and "Think", both of which were released as B-sides on Knight's singles "Rewind (Find a Way)" and "Made It Back 99" respectively. It was Franklin's vocal delivery that has most had an impact upon Knight:

Aretha taught me my phrasing and the way I carry emotion. She makes me cry and then she brings me into the throes of musical ecstasy – with the same voice! I Never Loved A Man hurts, and the Amazing Grace album, which is the epitome of my childhood, will stay with me for ever."

Knight has also recorded songs of other artists such as Stevie Wonder (whose "Love's in Need of Love Today" featured on the Warchild album Hope) and Curtis Mayfield (whose "Hard Times" appeared on Courtney Pine's Back in the Day album). But this influence has also manifested itself on stage where Knight often incorporates songs by her heroines such as Nina Simone ("Feelin' Good"), Chaka Khan ("I Feel For You" and "Sweet Thing") and Billie Holiday ("God Bless the Child") into her live performances.

In addition to the pioneering soul and gospel artists of the mid-20th century, modern artists such as Mary J. Blige and D'Angelo have also played a role in shaping Knight's musical outlook. The most significant of her contemporary peers comes in the form of Prince, a man she describes as one of her heroes: "Prince goes back to me listening to preachers when I was a child, who tell a story to illustrate a point...the first song I heard by him was 'Little Red Corvette', when I was nine. Of course, I didn't have a clue about what he was singing about; the sexuality is implicit and I love that." The influence of Prince, whom Knight even mentions on her Prodigal Sista and Who I Am album sleeves, can be seen throughout her back catalogue with songs such as "Get Up!", "Hurricane Jane" and "Supersonic" being compared to Prince due to their mix of funk and soul.

Throughout her childhood, Knight's musical exposure developed as she got older. Gospel led to soul, which led to funk which led to R&B – but growing up in the Midlands meant that she was exposed to many other influences: "It wasn't a case that there was a huge black community who all stuck together and only listened to reggae or R&B or strictly black music. I find that London is a bit more segregated. In Wolverhampton, black people weren't so segregated and I think that had a massive impact on my musical influences." This diversity is illustrated best by Knight's fourth studio album, Affirmation. After working with Guy Chambers, the album had a more mainstream flavour compared to her previous albums and was led by the rock guitar driven single "Come as You Are". Although the song became her highest charting single to date, Knight was largely criticised by urban radio and media for moving too far away from her urban sound. Nevertheless, the song illustrated Knight's determined effort not to become boxed in and "ghettoised".

== Discography ==
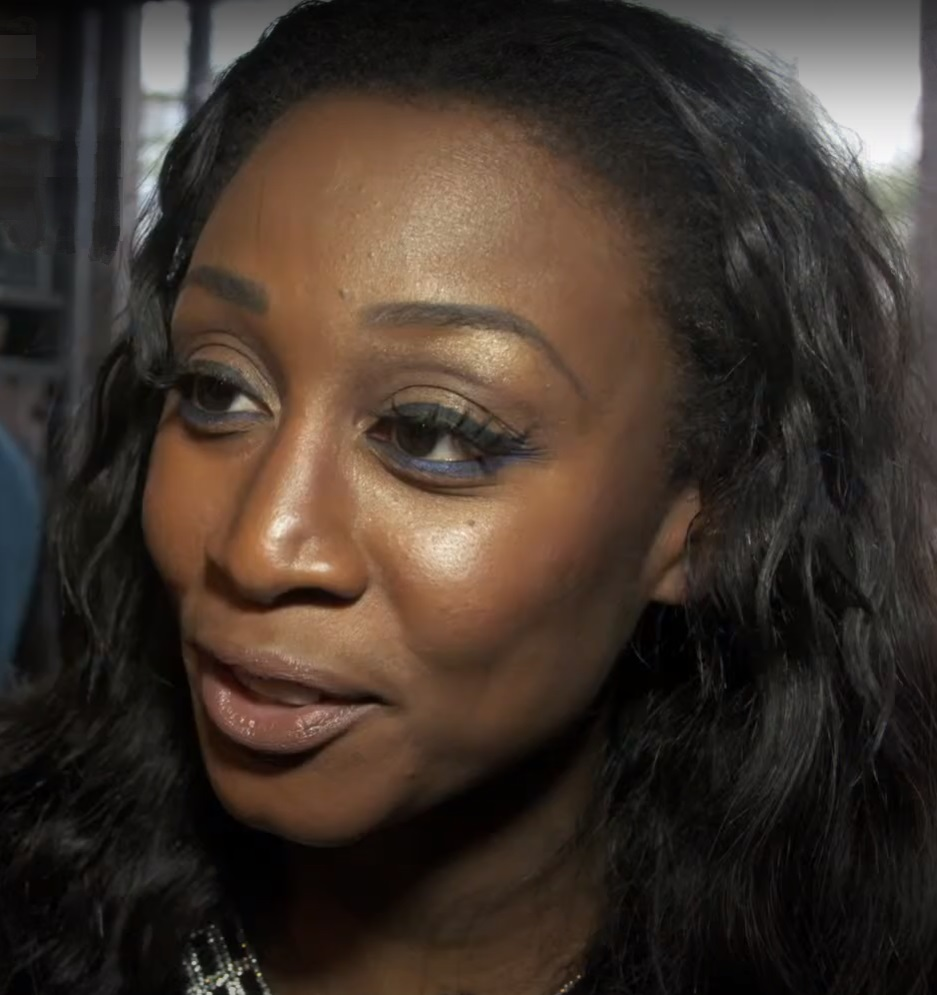
Beverley Knight in 2016

Solo albums

- The B-Funk (1995)
- Prodigal Sista (1998)
- Who I Am (2002)
- Affirmation (2004)
- Music City Soul (2007)
- 100% (2009)
- Soul UK (2011)
- Soulsville (2016)
- The Fifth Chapter (2023)

== Tours ==
- 2002 – Who I Am Tour
- 2002 – Beverley Knight Tour
- 2005 – Affirmation Tour
- 2006 – Voice – The Best of Tour
- 2007 – Music City Soul Tour
- 2009–10 – 100% Tour
- 2011 – Soul UK Tour
- 2016 – Soulsville Tour
- 2019 – Friday Night is Music Night presents: The Songs of Stevie Wonder starring Beverley Knight
- 2023 – 50 Tour
- 2026 - Born To Perform Tour

== Stage ==
| Year | Title | Role | Notes |
|---|---|---|---|
| 2013–14 | The Bodyguard | Rachel Marron | West End |
| 2014–15 | Memphis | Felicia | West End |
| 2015–16 | Cats | Grizabella | West End |
| 2016–17 | The Bodyguard | Rachel Marron | West End |
| 2017–18 | Cinderella | Fairy Godmother | Birmingham |
| 2018 | Sylvia | Emmeline Pankhurst | West End |
| 2019 | Sweet Charity | Daddy Brubeck | West End |
| 2020 | Pantoland at the Palladium | Fairy Godmother | West End |
| 2021–22 | The Drifters Girl | Faye Treadwell | Newcastle and West End |
| 2022 | Sister Act | Deloris van Cartier | Eventim Apollo |
| 2023 | Sylvia | Emmeline Pankhurst | The Old Vic |
| 2024 | Sister Act | Deloris van Cartier | Dominion Theatre |
| 2025–26 | Marie & Rosetta | Rosetta Tharpe | Rose Theatre and Minerva Theatre |

== Achievements ==
=== Accolades ===
Knight appointed a Member of the Order of the British Empire in the 2006 Birthday Honours for services to music. The award was bestowed by Queen Elizabeth II at a ceremony at Buckingham Palace in February 2007. After the ceremony Knight remarked that the recognition "reflects not only on my whole career but the work I do for charities, which is immensely important to me. I do not do that to be awarded for it, I just do it because it's in my heart, but to be recognised for it, hopefully will put the magnifying glass on to them as well".

In September 2005 Knight was presented with an honorary degree from the University of Wolverhampton "in recognition of her outstanding contribution to music and the local community, and in recognition of her extensive charity work." Upon being made a Doctor of Music, she stated she was proud to be black, female, and British, adding: "it is still all me, I have not forgotten my roots."

On 7 January 2010 Knight won an edition of the BBC's television quiz series Celebrity Mastermind, answering questions on "The Life and Times of Prince". Knight's chosen charity for the show was the Terrence Higgins Trust. On 29 August 2012 during the 2012 Summer Paralympics opening ceremony, Knight, deaf performer Caroline Parker and Lizzie Emeh appeared on stage to close the opening ceremony with a performance of "I Am What I Am". The performers and the audience joined in the song using sign-language.

On 16 May 2018, Knight was presented with the Freedom of the City of Wolverhampton. Knight said "this personal award which I'm able to share with the whole city is beautiful. I was born and raised in Wolverhampton and to have such an accolade given to me is seismic". On Twitter the following day, Knight continued "I am now an honorary Freeman of the City of Wolverhampton. There are only around 30 in the city's history. Disclaimer: My eye [sic] are red from tears of joy".

Freedom of the City is the highest honour we can bestow and it is only granted very rarely to exceptional individuals. Beverley Knight has achieved outstanding international success as a recording artist, performer, West End star and charity ambassador. She deserves this honour not only for her achievements, but also for the positive and exemplary manner in which she conducts herself, she has never forgotten her roots and is passionate about Wolverhampton and its people.

— Mayor of the City of Wolverhampton, Cllr. Phil Page.

=== Awards and nominations ===
| Year | Award | Category | Work | Result |
|---|---|---|---|---|
| 1996 | Black Music Award | Best R&B Act | | Won |
| 1996 | Black Music Award | Best Producer | | Won |
| 1998 | MOBO Award | Best Single | "Made It Back" | Nominated |
| 1998 | MOBO Award | Best R&B Act | | Won |
| 1999 | MOBO Award | Best R&B Act | | Won |
| 1999 | MOBO Award | Best Single | "Greatest Day" | Nominated |
| 1999 | MOBO Award | Best Album | Prodigal Sista | Won |
| 1999 | E.M.M.A. Award | Best British Music Act | | Won |
| 2000 | Brit Award | British Female Solo Artist | | Nominated |
| 2002 | Mercury Prize | | Who I Am | Nominated |
| 2002 | E.M.M.A. Award | Best British Music Act | | Nominated |
| 2002 | MOBO Award | Best British Act | | Nominated |
| 2003 | Brit Award | British Female Solo Artist | | Nominated |
| 2003 | Brit Award | British Urban Act | | Nominated |
| 2003 | Capital FM Award | London's Favourite Female Vocalist (Solo) | | Nominated |
| 2004 | Capital FM Award | London's Favourite Female Vocalist (Solo) | | Nominated |
| 2004 | Urban Music Award | Lifetime Achievement Award | | Won |
| 2006 | MOBO Award | Best British Female | | Nominated |
| 2007 | MOBO Award | Best British Female | | Nominated |
| 2008 | MOBO Award | Best R&B/Soul Act | | Nominated |
| 2009 | MOBO Award | Best UK Act | | Nominated |
| 2011 | Urban Music Award | Best Album | Soul UK | Won |
| 2015 | Laurence Olivier Award | Best Actress in a Musical | Memphis | Nominated |
| 2015 | WhatsOnStage Award | Best Actress in a Musical | Memphis | Nominated |
| 2016 | WhatsOnStage Award | Best Actress in a Musical | Cats | Nominated |
| 2018 | Classic Brit Award | Album of the Year | Songs from the Stage | Nominated |
| 2019 | Black British Theatre Awards | Best Supporting Female Actor in a Musical | Sylvia | Won |
| 2022 | Laurence Olivier Award | Best Actress in a Musical | The Drifters Girl | Nominated |
| 2022 | WhatsOnStage Award | Best Performer in a Female Identifying Role in a Musical | The Drifters Girl | Nominated |
| 2023 | Laurence Olivier Award | Best Supporting Actress in a Musical | Sylvia | Won |

== Personal life ==
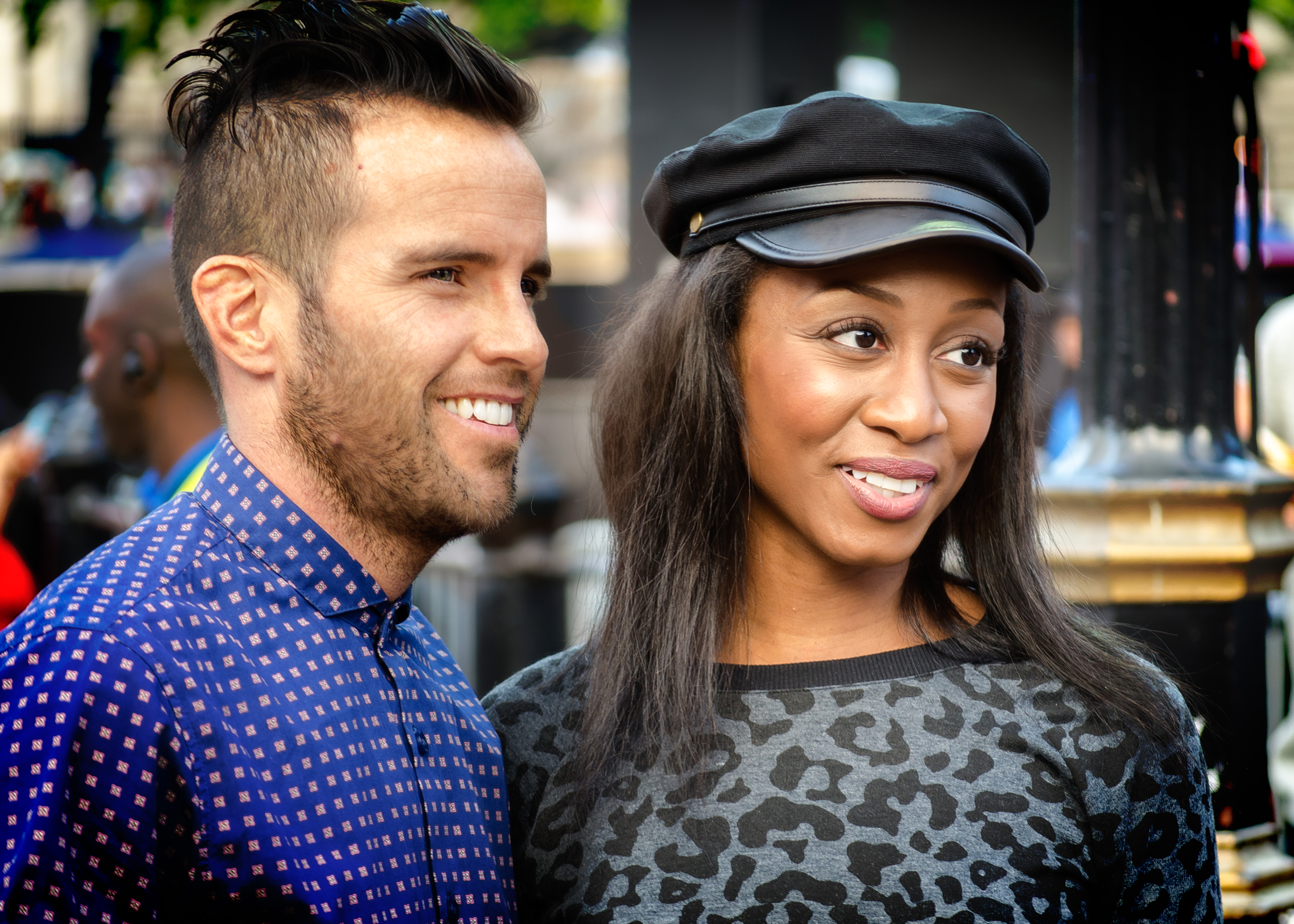
Knight with husband James O'Keefe, 2013

Beverley Knight is a keen supporter of home city football club Wolverhampton Wanderers; in February 2026, she was named as Wolves Foundation ambassador for the club. Knight married her boyfriend, James O'Keefe, on 8 September 2012.
