= Ty Fyffe production discography =

The following is a production discography of American record producer Tyrone "Ty" Fyffe (also known as Sugarless). It includes a list of songs produced, co-produced and remixed by year, title, artist and album.

== Production discography ==
List of songs produced and/or co-produced, with other performing artists, showing year released and album name
Year	Song	Artist	Album	Notes
1992	"Rump Shaker"	Wreckx-n-Effect	Hard or Smooth	prod. w/ Teddy Riley
1992	"New Jack Swing II (Hard Version)"	Wreckx-n-Effect	Hard or Smooth	prod. w/ Teddy Riley, Aqil Davidson, Franklyn Grant, Markell Riley
1992	"Wreckx Shop"	Wreckx-n-Effect	Hard or Smooth	prod. w/ Teddy Riley, Aqil Davidson, co-prod. Wreckx-n-Effect
1992	"Wreckx-N-Effect"	Wreckx-n-Effect	Hard or Smooth	prod. w/ Teddy Riley, Aqil Davidson, Markell Riley
1992	"Hard"	Wreckx-n-Effect	Hard or Smooth	prod. w/ Teddy Riley, Franklyn Grant
1992	"Smooth"	Wreckx-n-Effect	Hard or Smooth	prod. w/ Teddy Riley, Franklyn Grant
1993	"Once She Gets Pumpin'"	Father MC	Sex Is Law	prod. w/ Teddy Riley
1993	"Brooklyn"	MC Lyte	Ain't No Other and Amongst Friends (Original Motion Picture Soundtrack)	prod. w/ Franklyn Grant, Markell Riley
1993	"I Go On"	MC Lyte	Ain't No Other	prod. w/ Franklyn Grant, Markell Riley, Walter "Mucho" Scott
1994	"Keep On"	Shinehead	Troddin’	prod. w/ Franklyn Grant
1994	"Me and Them"	Shinehead	Troddin’	prod. w/ Franklyn Grant
1994	"Tootin' on the Hooters"	Ed Lover, Doctor Dré	Back Up Off Me!	co-producer; prod. by Franklyn Grant
1994	"It's Like That Y'all"	Ed Lover, Doctor Dré	Back Up Off Me!	co-producer; prod. by Franklyn Grant
1995	"Papa Luv It"	LL Cool J	The Show: The Soundtrack and Mr. Smith	prod. w/ LL Cool J
1995	"Bomdigi"	Erick Sermon	Double or Nothing	co-producer; prod. by Erick Sermon
1995	"In the Heat"	Erick Sermon	Double or Nothing	co-producer; prod. by Erick Sermon
1995	"Move On"	Erick Sermon, Redman, Passion	Double or Nothing	co-producer; prod. by Erick Sermon
1996	"Up Jump the Boogie"	The Wixtons	Insomnia	co-producer; prod. by Erick Sermon
1996	"Ooh La La"	Red Eye	Kingpin (Original Motion Picture Soundtrack)	N/A
1996	"Blacka da Berry"	Alfonzo Hunter	Blacka Da Berry	co-producer; prod. by Erick Sermon
1996	"Rhymin' With Kel"	Keith Murray, Kel-Vicious	Enigma	co-producer; prod. by Erick Sermon
1996	"What a Feelin'"	Keith Murray	Enigma	prod. w/ Erick Sermon
1996	"Hot to Def"	Keith Murray	Enigma	prod. w/ Erick Sermon
1996	"Yeah"	Keith Murray, Erick Sermon, Busta Rhymes, Jamal, Redman	Enigma	co-producer; prod. by Erick Sermon
1996	"Rock da Spot"	Redman	Muddy Waters	prod. w/ Erick Sermon
1997	"Jockin' My Style"	Craig Mack	Operation: Get Down	N/A
1997	"Today's Forecast"	Craig Mack	Operation: Get Down	N/A
1998	"Murdergram"	Murder Inc.	Streets Is Watching Soundtrack	N/A
1998	"Exquisite"	McGruff	Destined to Be	N/A
1998	"Destined to Be"	McGruff	Destined to Be	N/A
1998	"Danger Zone"	McGruff, Big L, Ma$e	Destined to Be	co-prod. w/ Damian "DEO" Blyden
1998	"Judgement Day"	Method Man	Tical 2000: Judgement Day	additional producer; prod. by Method Man, co-prod. by 4th Disciple
1998	"What!"	Darcsyde	N/A	N/A
1998	"Pretender"	Darcsyde	N/A	N/A
1999	"Your Eyes" / "Tus Ojos"	Elsie Muniz	N/A	prod. w/ Gavin "Pretty Boy" Marchand
1999	"I Can't"	Foxy Brown, Total	Chyna Doll	N/A
1999	"Bonnie & Clyde Part II"	Foxy Brown, Jay-Z	Chyna Doll	N/A
1999	"Tramp"	Foxy Brown	Chyna Doll	N/A
1999	"Enjoy Yourself"	A+	Hempstead High	N/A
1999	"I Own America Part I"	Slick Rick	The Art of Storytelling	prod. w/ DJ Clark Kent
1999	"King Piece in the Chess Game"	Slick Rick, Canibus	The Art of Storytelling	N/A
1999	"World's Most Dangerous"	Ja Rule, Nemesis O-1	Venni Vetti Vecci	prod. w/ Irv Gotti, Lil' Rob
1999	"It's Murda"	Murder Inc.	Venni Vetti Vecci	co-prod. by Irv Gotti
1999	"Only Begotten Son"	Ja Rule	Venni Vetti Vecci	prod. w/ Irv Gotti, Lil' Rob
1999	"Who Is a Thug"	Big Pun, 6430	Whiteboys (Original Motion Picture Soundtrack)	N/A
1999	"Disqualification (Intro)"	Humanreck	Deadly and Dangerous	N/A
1999	"No Gunz"	Humanreck	Deadly and Dangerous	co-producer; prod. by Rod 'KP' Kirkpatrick
1999	"Revoloution"	Humanreck	Deadly and Dangerous	N/A
1999	"On Fiya"	Humanreck	Deadly and Dangerous	N/A
1999	"High Divas"	Humanreck, Keith Murray, Kel-Vicious	Deadly and Dangerous	co-producer; prod. by Rod 'KP' Kirkpatrick
1999	"Beginning to End"	Humanreck	Deadly and Dangerous	N/A
1999	"Living Life Like a Gangsta'"	Humanreck	Deadly and Dangerous	N/A
1999	"This Life Forever"	Jay-Z	Black Gangster Original Soundtrack	N/A
1999	"Represent"	Ja Rule	Black Gangster Original Soundtrack	N/A
2000	"Murderers"	Ja Rule, Black Child, Caddillac Tah	Irv Gotti Presents: The Murderers	prod. w/ Irv Gotti
2000	"2000 B.C. (Before Can-I-Bus)"	Canibus	2000 B.C. (Before Can-I-Bus)	N/A
2000	"Die Slow"	Canibus, Journalist	2000 B.C. (Before Can-I-Bus)	N/A
2000	"All Money Is Legal (A.M.I.L.)"	Amil	All Money Is Legal	N/A
2000	"4 da Fam"	Amil, Jay-Z, Memphis Bleek, Beanie Sigel	All Money Is Legal	N/A
2000	"Can't Think"	LL Cool J	G.O.A.T.	N/A
2000	"Die"	Ja Rule, Caddillac Tah, Black Child, Dave Bing	Rule 3:36	prod. w/ Irv Gotti
2000	"Rescue Me"	Monifah	Home	prod. w/ Teddy Riley
2000	"High Rollers"	Q-Tip, Consequence	Next Up: Rap's New Generation	N/A
2001	"Pussy Ain't for Free"	Queen Pen	Conversations with Queen	N/A
2001	"I Got Cha"	Queen Pen	Conversations with Queen	prod. w/ Teddy Riley
2001	"Quiet Money TBS"	AZ	9 Lives	prod. w/ Tydro
2001	"Dial M for Murder"	Ja Rule	Pain Is Love	co-producer; prod. by Irv Gotti
2001	"One Shot Kill"	Jayo Felony	Crip Hop	N/A
2001	"Sherm Sticc III"	Jayo Felony	Crip Hop	N/A
2001	"Dirty Dirty"	Mil	Street Scriptures	prod. w/ Gavin "Pretty Boy" Marchand
2001	"Street Shit"	Mil, Memphis Bleek	Street Scriptures	N/A
2002	"Intro"	Cam'ron, DJ Kay Slay	Come Home with Me	N/A
2002	"On Fire Tonight"	Cam'ron, Freekey Zekey	Come Home with Me	N/A
2002	"Stop Calling"	Cam'ron, Freekey Zekey, McGruff	Come Home with Me	N/A
2002	"I Just Wanna"	Cam'ron, Juelz Santana	Come Home with Me	prod. w/ Neek Rusher
2002	"Boy Boy"	Cam'ron	Come Home with Me	prod. w/ Rsonist
2002	"Milk Shake"	Ill Beingz	Wild Amerika	N/A
2002	"BK to LA"	Xzibit, M.O.P.	Man vs. Machine	co-prod. by Tydro
2002	"It's Nothing"	Fat Joe, Tony Sunshine	Loyalty	N/A
2002	"D-Elite"	Royce da 5'9"	Rock City	N/A
2003	"Nine"	54th Platoon	All or Nothin'	N/A
2003	"Don't"	54th Platoon	All or Nothin'	N/A
2003	"Niggah Nah"	Glory Warz	Click of Respect	N/A
2004	"Throw Back"	Royce da 5'9", Ingrid Smalls	Death Is Certain	N/A
2004	"Does He Love Me"	Keshia Chanté, Foxy Brown	Keshia Chanté	add. producer; prod. by Gavin Marchand
2005	"Change"	Beanie Sigel, Melissa Jay, Rell	The B. Coming	N/A
2006	"Living a Lie"	Cam'ron	Killa Season	N/A
2007	"Where I Belong"	Mims	Music Is My Savior	N/A
2007	"Gun Blast"	Bone Thugs-n-Harmony	Strength & Loyalty	N/A
2007	"On My Grizzy"	Benzino	The Antidote	N/A
2007	"Pocket Full of Gzzz"	Benzino	The Antidote	N/A
2007	"Let It Bang"	Benzino	The Antidote	N/A
2007	"Straight to the Bank"	50 Cent	Curtis	add. prod. by Dr. Dre
2008	"T.O.S."	G-Unit	T·O·S (Terminate on Sight)	N/A
2008	"Puttin' Work In"	EPMD, Raekwon	We Mean Business	N/A
2009	"Hustler's Anthem '09"	Busta Rhymes, T-Pain	Back on My B.S.	N/A
2009	"Father's Day"	Method Man & Redman	Blackout! 2	N/A
2009	"The Invitation"	50 Cent	Before I Self Destruct	co-prod. by Manny Perez
2010	"Smooth Sailing"	Ghostface Killah, Trife, Solomon Childs	Wu-Tang Killa Bees – Pollen: The Swarm Part Three	N/A
2010	"That's Where I Be"	Redman, DJ Kool	Redman Presents... Reggie	prod. w/ Efrain "F.A.M.E." Rodriguez
2011	"Orange & Black Caviar"	Tony Yayo	El Chapo	N/A
2011	"Body Bag"	Tony Yayo, Mobb Deep	El Chapo	N/A
2011	"Assist"	Tony Yayo, Trav	El Chapo	N/A
2011	"Uhh-Ohh"	Styles P, Sheek Louch	Master of Ceremonies	N/A
2011	"The Way You Move"	Lazee, DJ Large	One Way Ticket	N/A
2012	"Pretty Thug"	Prodigy	H.N.I.C. 3	N/A
2012	"Let Me Show You"	Prodigy, Vaughn Anthony	H.N.I.C. 3	N/A
2014	"Chase the Paper"	50 Cent, Prodigy, Kidd Kidd, Styles P	Animal Ambition: An Untamed Desire to Win	co-prod. by Ky Miller
2015	"First 48 (Intro)"	Jadakiss	Top 5 Dead or Alive	N/A
2017	"Next to You"	Twista, Jeremih	Crook County	N/A
2019	"Zion"	Erick Sermon, Xzibit, David Banner, Shaquille O'Neal	Vernia	N/A

== Remixes ==
List of songs remixed, with other performing artists, showing year released and album name
Year	Song	Artist	Album	Notes
1993	"Stand By Your Man" (Hip Hop Mix 2)	LL Cool J	N/A	N/A
1993	"My Cutie" (Remix)	Wreckx-n-Effect	N/A	remixed w/ Teddy Riley
1993	"All About Love" (Future Mix)	The Party	N/A	remixed w/ Franklyn Grant, Sprague "Doogie" Williams, Walter "Mucho" Scott
1998	"Can't Help It" (Remix)	Royal Flush	N/A	N/A
2002	"When I Get You Alone" (Remix)	Thicke	N/A	prod. w/ Bobby Springsteen
2002	"One Mic" (Remix)	Nas	The Lost Tapes	N/A
2002	"Dirty Dirty" (Remix)	UGK, Mil	Side Hustles	N/A
2010	"Smooth Sailing" (Remix)	Ghostface Killah, Method Man, Streetlife, Solomon Childs	Wu-Massacre	N/A
