= Piece by Piece (soundtrack) =

Piece by Piece (Music from the Motion Picture)

Soundtrack album by Pharrell Williams and various artists
- Released: October 11, 2024
- Length: 86:00
- Label: Columbia; I Am Other
- Producer: Pharrell Williams; Chad Hugo

Pharrell Williams chronology
| Hidden Figures (2017) | Piece by Piece (Music from the Motion Picture) (2024) |

Singles from Piece by Piece (Music from the Motion Picture)
- 1. "Piece by Piece" Released: September 13, 2024

Piece by Piece (Music from the Motion Picture) is the soundtrack album to the 2024 animated film Piece by Piece, co-produced and directed by Morgan Neville. Based on the life of American musician Pharrell Williams, the album consisted of 21 tracks—five original songs written and performed by Williams while the remainder of it consisted of existing tracks performed by other artists; this also includes Williams' older songs as well. The titular single from the album was released on September 13, 2024, and the complete soundtrack was released on October 11, 2024, through Columbia Records and I Am Other.

== Development ==
Williams wrote five original songs for the project. Two songs, which he solely wrote, composed and produced, were made for specific scenes, the second one outlined the story which he described it as "like my thesis — [which is] that God is the greatest". The remaining three tracks were co-written with his longtime collaborative partner Chad Hugo who also produced the soundtrack. Neville noted that Williams had written "early tracks and other bits of score" during the production.

The film also incorporated other songs of Williams which were commercially released, in most of other tracks where Williams was the featuring artist such as Daft Punk's "Get Lucky" with Nile Rodgers (which was soundtracked in the first trailer), Snoop Dogg's "Drop It Like It's Hot" and "Beautiful" with Uncle Charlie Wilson, and other tracks where he was the sole artist, such as "Frontin'" featuring Jay-Z and "Happy" which featured in Despicable Me 2 (2013) and his second studio album Girl (2014). Other featured artists include N.E.R.D., Justin Timberlake, Jay-Z, Kendrick Lamar, Wreckx-n-Effect amongst others.

Michael Andrews composed the incidental underscore that complemented the songs featured in the film.

== Release ==
The titular track "Piece By Piece" was released as the lead single from the album on September 13, 2024. The song is performed by Williams featuring the Princess Anne High School's marching band the Fabulous Marching Cavaliers.

On October 2, 2024, Williams unveiled the track list of the album in his Instagram account featuring 21 tracks. The album was released day-and-date with the film on October 11, 2024, through Williams' I Am Other and Columbia Records label.

== Critical reception ==
Peter Debruge of Variety described the songs being "fresh, neatly reworked". Tony Maglio of IndieWire described the titular track as "banger" although "not quite as good or earworm-y" as Williams' "Happy". Lovia Gyarkye of The Hollywood Reporter wrote Williams' original songs "complement Michael Andrews' fanciful score." Caleb Hammond of IndieWire also wrote "like so many other moments in "Piece by Piece," the music does the heavy lifting: Williams' otherworldly production matched with Lamar's rapping are powerfully rendered on screen, even if the LEGO framing here plays as a little ridiculous juxtaposed against the serious subject matter."

William Bibbiani of TheWrap wrote "There are so many songs. "Piece by Piece" doesn't stop to play them all in their entirety because it's not Bernardo Bertolucci's director's cut of "1900" and we don't have all the time in the world. If you only know Pharrell Williams from his hit single "Happy" you will have your mind completely blown by how many classic songs he and his producing partner Chad Hugo have been directly responsible for, or at least guided to fruition. It's such an incredible, high volume, high quality artistic output that it's legitimately hard to process, but to hear Pharrell tell it, it was his day job."

== Track listing ==
Piece by Piece (Music from the Motion Picture) track listing
| No. | Title | Writer(s) | Artist(s) | Length |
|---|---|---|---|---|
| 1. | "It's Happening" | Pharrell Williams; Shelly Berg | Pharrell Williams | 0:33 |
| 2. | "Piece by Piece" | Williams | Pharrell Williams and Princess Anne High School Fabulous Marching Cavaliers | 2:53 |
| 3. | "Virginia Boy" (remix) | Williams; Tyler Okonma | Pharrell Williams featuring Tyler, the Creator | 2:08 |
| 4. | "L'EGO Odyssey" | Williams; Berg | Pharrell Williams | 4:20 |
| 5. | "For Real" | Williams | Pharrell Williams | 3:15 |
| 6. | "Maybe" | Williams; Chad Hugo | N.E.R.D. | 4:23 |
| 7. | "God Bless Us All" | Williams; Hugo | N.E.R.D. | 3:31 |
| 8. | "Señorita" | Williams; Hugo; Justin Timberlake | Justin Timberlake | 4:55 |
| 9. | "Rock Star" | Williams; Hugo | N.E.R.D. | 4:21 |
| 10. | "Rump Shaker" | Williams; Teddy Riley; Aqil Davidson; David Wynn; Darren Callis; Anton Hollins | Wreckx-n-Effect | 5:12 |
| 11. | "Superthug" (LP version) | Williams; Hugo; Victor Santiago | Noreaga | 5:00 |
| 12. | "I Just Wanna Love U (Give It 2 Me)" | Shawn Carter; Williams; Hugo; Rick James | Jay-Z | 3:49 |
| 13. | "Hella Good" | Gwen Stefani; Tony Kanal; Williams; Hugo | No Doubt | 4:03 |
| 14. | "Drop It Like It's Hot" | Calvin Broadus; Tim Stahl; John Guldberg; Williams; Hugo | Snoop Dogg featuring Pharrell Williams | 4:30 |
| 15. | "Grindin'" | Gene Thornton Jr.; Terrence Thornton; Williams; Hugo | Clipse | 4:26 |
| 16. | "Frontin'" (club mix) | Williams; Hugo; Carter | Pharrell Williams featuring Jay-Z | 3:56 |
| 17. | "Beautiful" | Broadus; Williams; Hugo | Snoop Dogg featuring Pharrell Williams and Uncle Charlie Wilson | 4:59 |
| 18. | "Sooner or Later" | Williams | N.E.R.D. | 6:43 |
| 19. | "Get Lucky" | Thomas Bangalter; Guy-Manuel de Homem-Christo; Williams; Nile Rodgers | Daft Punk featuring Pharrell Williams and Nile Rodgers | 6:09 |
| 20. | "Happy" (from Despicable Me 2) | Williams | Pharrell Williams | 3:53 |
| 21. | "Alright" | Kendrick Duckworth; Mark Spears; Williams | Kendrick Lamar | 3:39 |
| Total length: | | | | 86:00 |

== Additional tracks ==
Songs that are in the film, but not included on the soundtrack, include the following:

- "I Wish" by Stevie Wonder
- "Hollaback Girl" by Gwen Stefani
- "Funkytown" by Lipps Inc.
- "Blurred Lines" by Robin Thicke featuring T.I. and Pharrell Williams
- "Tubthumping" by Chumbawamba
- "My Prerogative" by Bobby Brown
- "Bonita Applebum" by A Tribe Called Quest
- "Everyone Nose (All the Girls Standing in the Line for the Bathroom)" by N.E.R.D.
- "Milkshake" by Kelis
- "Nothin'" by N.O.R.E.
- "Spaz" by N.E.R.D. (Note: Due to the negative connotations surrounding the word "spaz" in countries like the United Kingdom, Ireland and Australia, the song's title is changed to "Splash" in the film's credits.)
- "Lookin' at Me" by Mase featuring Puff Daddy
- "I'm a Slave 4 U" by Britney Spears
- "Knock Yourself Out" by Jadakiss
- "Shake Ya Ass" by Mystikal featuring Pharrell Williams
- "U Don't Have To Call" by Usher
- "Give It 2 Me" by Madonna
- "Work It Out" by Beyonce
- "Hot in Herre" by Nelly
- "Like I Love You" by Justin Timberlake
- "Say Somethin'" by Mariah Carey and Snoop Dogg
- "Pass the Courvoisier, Part II" by Busta Rhymes feat. P. Diddy and Pharrell Williams
- "I've Seen the Light/Inside of Clouds" by N.E.R.D.
- "Pure Imagination" by Gene Wilder (from the film Willy Wonka and the Chocolate Factory)

== Credits ==
Credits adapted from Film Music Reporter:

- Original songs written and performed by Pharrell Williams
- Original score composed and produced by Michael Andrews
- Music producer: Pharrell Williams, Chad Hugo
- Music mixer: Mike Larson
- Music editors: Todd Burke, Todd Kasow
- Score recorded at Elgin Park Recordings
- Score engineer: Alexander Thompson
- Score mixer: Todd Burke
- Musicians: Michael Andrews, Robert Walrer, Gabe Noel, Kenneth Crouch
- Choir: Phylicia Hill, Rick Charles Nelson, Lorie v. Moore, Pattie Howard, Ty Taylor, Diimond, Amber Sauer, Elle Skyes
