= Piece by Piece (2024 film) =

2024 film by Morgan Neville

- Theatrical release poster
- Directed by: Morgan Neville
- Written by: Morgan Neville; Aaron Wickenden; Oscar Vazquez; Jason Zeldes
- Produced by: Pharrell Williams; Mimi Valdés; Caitrin Rogers; Morgan Neville; Shani Saxon
- Starring: Pharrell Williams
- Cinematography: Chris Stover
- Edited by: Jason Zeldes; Aaron Wickenden; Oscar Vazquez
- Music by: Michael Andrews (score); Pharrell Williams (songs)
- Production companies: Universal Animation Studios; I Am Other; Tremolo Productions
- Distributed by: Focus Features (United States); Universal Pictures (International)
- Release dates: August 30, 2024 (Telluride); October 11, 2024 (United States)
- Running time: 93 minutes
- Country: United States
- Language: English
- Budget: $16 million
- Box office: $10.7 million

Piece by Piece is a 2024 American animated biographical documentary comedy film co-produced, co-written and directed by Morgan Neville. It follows the life and career of American musician Pharrell Williams, who stars in the film, through the lens of Lego animation, or brickfilm. Produced by Neville's Tremolo Productions, Williams' I Am Other, and in association with The Lego Group, Piece by Piece marks the sixth theatrical Lego-based film and the first under Universal Pictures' run of their film rights. Alongside Williams and Neville, the film stars the voices of Gwen Stefani, Kendrick Lamar, Timbaland, Justin Timberlake, Busta Rhymes, Jay-Z, and Snoop Dogg as Lego versions of themselves.

Williams had considered creating a film about his life since 2013; however, serious plans for a documentary in animated musical form started in 2019 following a discussion between Williams and Neville. Neville interviewed with Williams' associates remotely during the COVID-19 pandemic, and later shot certain live-action scenes with him. The Lego Group created minifigure pieces that better represent the styles of African-American culture, as well as Williams's frequent collaborators, and designed new pieces for music equipment. Williams, who also produces, wrote five original songs for the film.

Piece by Piece premiered at the 51st Telluride Film Festival on August 30, 2024, and was released theatrically in the United States and Canada on October 11 through Focus Features, with Universal handling international distribution. The film received generally positive reviews from critics and grossed $10.7 million against a $16 million budget.

== Plot ==
The film starts with Pharrell Williams talking to documentary filmmaker Morgan Neville. Pharrell explains that he wants to tell his story in Lego form, as his view of the world is like that of a Lego set, which is building something from another pre-existing material.

Pharrell's story begins in Virginia Beach, where he lived in the Atlantis housing projects with his parents, Pharaoh and Carolyn. He had synesthesia, which made him see colors in music. Pharrell was captivated by artists like Stevie Wonder, which sparked his passion for music. While he struggled in school academically, even having to repeat the 7th grade despite having enough credits to pass. He befriended Chad Hugo and created music with him, along with future artists like Missy Elliott, Pusha T, and Timbaland.

Pharrell and Chad ended up working together to form The Neptunes. They performed at their school's talent show for famed record producer Teddy Riley. Impressed, Teddy signed the guys on. Pharrell helped come up with some work for Teddy, like writing his verse on the song "Rump Shaker" for Teddy's group Wreckx-n-Effect, but working for Teddy meant Pharrell could not work on his own music.

Later on, Pharrell and Chad would work with rapper N.O.R.E. on his hit single "Superthug", before also working with Pusha T and fellow rapper Malice (with their duo Clipse) and later Mystikal on his song "Shake Ya Ass". This caught the attention of other major artists like Jay-Z, Busta Rhymes, Gwen Stefani, and Justin Timberlake. Jay-Z describes Pharrell as a "younger brother" that the other artists in the industry wanted to look out for, since he was opening doors for a lot of them.

Pharrell and Chad are later called to work with Snoop Dogg, famously known for his gangsta rap image. After a session involving 'PG Spray' (cannabis), the guys come up with "Drop It Like It's Hot". Snoop notes that this was his first number one single, and that he felt Pharrell brought out a fun side of him.

Pharrell eventually tried to become a solo artist, starting with the single "Frontin'" that he did with Jay-Z. One record producer notes that this should have propelled Pharrell to solo status. Pharrell persisted with trying to build his brand, expanding from music to other outlets, such as skateboarding or fashion. He created the Billionaire Boys Club brand and Ice Cream footwear. Others note that Pharrell was starting to spread himself too thin, taking away from the spark that usually drove him. Eventually, Pharrell was able to make a comeback, collaborating with Daft Punk and Nile Rodgers on the single "Get Lucky", earning them all the Grammy Award for Record of the Year.

Pharrell's wife Helen gives an interview discussing how they met. She went to one of his parties and noted that he was surrounded by other women, but he noticed her and went up to her, asking many questions until Helen said she had a boyfriend. Helen later broke up with that man and eventually dated and married Pharrell.

While stuck in a creative rut, Pharrell was tasked with writing music for the Despicable Me films. He spends time with his family, particularly his infant son, and he becomes inspired to create "Happy". It becomes a smash hit across the world, with people in various countries recreating the famous music video. Pharrell's interview with Oprah Winfrey where he begins crying is recreated.

Pharrell gets emotional talking to Neville about how his family and his friends have driven his success. However, he also discusses the political state of things, specifically in regard to police brutality against African Americans. Pharrell provided the hook for Kendrick Lamar's song "Alright", which became a popular phrase among groups like the Black Lives Matter movement.

As Pharrell and Neville come to the film's conclusion, Pharrell once again shares his outlook on life, and how one can take things and build it up to be something better, much like Lego. Pharrell then concludes with a concert featuring him performing his new song "Piece By Piece".

== Voice cast ==
- Pharrell Williams as himself
- Morgan Neville as himself
- Gwen Stefani as herself
- Kendrick Lamar as himself
- Timbaland as himself
- Justin Timberlake as himself
- Busta Rhymes as himself
- Jay-Z as himself
- Snoop Dogg as himself
- Pusha T as himself
- Missy Elliott as herself
- Nigo as himself
- Teddy Riley as himself
- Tyler, the Creator as Mr. Thoroughgood, Pharrell's teacher

Chad Hugo appears as himself. Shay Haley, N.O.R.E., Daft Punk, Jimmy Iovine, Tammy Lucas, Tom Dumont, Tony Kanal, Adrian Young, Pharrell's parents Pharoah and Carolyn Williams, and Pharrell's wife Helen Lasichanh also make appearances as themselves.

== Production ==
=== Development ===
The film's production spanned around six years. Following the success of the songs "Happy" and "Get Lucky" in 2013, Williams's agent encouraged him to pursue creating a biography, encouraging him to "do it [his] own way". Williams was not interested in making a "traditional" biopic, but rather wanted to convey the story in a more imaginative and "genre-defying" way, where audiences would "immerse in a world where the possibilities are endless". Williams recalled, "Everyone was doing them at the time, and I was like, 'Hell no.' I never want to do what everybody else is doing". Williams approached Neville's agent with the idea for the film in early 2019, and after Neville had heard Williams's pitch, he agreed to help develop the project. Williams reiterated on his sentiment, stating "I never really wanted to do it, but when I was given the opportunity to do a documentary any way I wanted, and Morgan raised his hand, it was like, "OK, this could be interesting"." Williams's producing partner Mimi Valdés helped him decide which parts of his life and career he wanted to document.

Neville initially had conversations with Williams in person in early 2020. During the COVID-19 pandemic, Neville recruited Williams's friends and collaborators to appear in the film, recounting that "There was not a single person who, when we asked them to participate, even hesitated". The vast majority of his work with them transitioned into talking on his phone in his living room with people remotely, sending them audio personnel if they could not access a studio. Some live-action scenes were shot, including one with Williams at Virginia Beach. Being his animated film debut, Neville felt it was "incredibly exciting" to be able to control every visual aspect of the film, as opposed to the live-action films he had directed in the past. He explained the animated medium helped to better "channel" Williams into the story. After previous license holder Warner Bros. Pictures, which produced The Lego Movie franchise, let their rights to create Lego films lapse following the box office disappointment of The Lego Movie 2: The Second Part (2019), Universal Pictures bought them in April 2020, to last through 2025.

Neville and Williams had a "number of conversations" with The Lego Group about creating hairpieces and skin tones that were more inclusive to African Americans, pushing them to forensically examine different hairstyles and facial features. For the film, Lego created new pieces for boomboxes and turntables, and recreated recording studios for the first time. They designed minifigures for Williams's collaborators.

On June 6, 2024, Williams, Gwen Stefani, Kendrick Lamar, Timbaland, Justin Timberlake, Jay-Z, Snoop Dogg, Pusha T, and Busta Rhymes were revealed to be cast in the film. In an interview published that day with Variety, Neville revealed that Daft Punk appear in the film.

=== Music ===
Williams wrote five original songs for the project, describing two specifically. He described the first as "made for a specific scene", and the second, also made for a specific scene, as "like my thesis — [which is] that God is the greatest". Music that he composed with longtime creative partner Chad Hugo, as well as Williams's collaborations with other artists will feature in the film, such as Daft Punk's "Get Lucky" and Wreckx-n-Effect's "Rump Shaker". Neville noted that Williams created early tracks and "other bits of score" during production. The film score was composed by Michael Andrews.

Williams released the first single for the soundtrack, "Piece by Piece", on September 13, 2024. It features the Princess Anne High School's marching band, the Fabulous Marching Cavaliers. The soundtrack is distributed by Williams' I Am Other and Columbia Records label and was released on October 11, 2024, the same day as the film.

== Marketing ==
The project was announced on January 26, 2024. On June 6, 2024, Focus Features and Williams revealed the first trailer for the film. It features Williams in Lego form and director Neville in a sit-down interview, which then transitions to Williams narrating his career highlights. Writing for USA Today, Brendan Morrow observed that "the project look(s) like a unique mix of an animated film and a documentary". Dexerto observed that the appearance of Kendrick Lamar in the film, who had recently seen increased media coverage due to his feud with Canadian rapper Drake, was a subject of attention, with many commentators dubbing him "KenBRICK Lamar". The film's poster was revealed on August 29, which was noted for featuring Daft Punk. At TIFF, one of the venues where the film premiered, a Lego figure of Williams was placed in David Pecaut Square to promote its release.

On September 20, 2024, the website Piece By Piece Lego Minifigure Generator was created in promotion of the film.

== Release ==
Piece by Piece had its world premiere as the main opening headliner of the 51st Telluride Film Festival on August 30, 2024, screened at the Toronto International Film Festival grand opening celebration on September 7, 2024. It closed the last day of the 68th BFI London Film Festival closing day celebration on October 20, 2024. It was released theatrically in the United States by Focus Features, with Universal Pictures handling international distribution, on October 11, 2024, and was released theatrically in the United Kingdom on November 8, 2024.

=== Home media ===
Universal Pictures Home Entertainment released Piece by Piece for digital download on October 29, 2024, and was released on Blu-ray, and DVD on December 17, 2024. It was then released on Peacock on February 7, 2025, and was added to Netflix on June 7, 2025.

=== PETA disruptions ===
The TIFF premiere was interrupted by a PETA protestor targeting Williams's Louis Vuitton men's fashion collection, who held a sign reading "Pharrell: Stop Supporting Killing Animals for Fashion", and ran around disruptively, shouting at Williams and climbing the stage. Williams agreed and praised the act, saying "God bless you" repeatedly to the protestor, and encouraged the audience to applaud and say the same, before she was kicked out.

The BFI London Film Festival screening was crashed by two PETA protesters displaying a banner reading "Pharrell: Stop Supporting Killing Animals for Fashion".

== Reception ==
=== Box office ===
Piece by Piece grossed $9.7 million in the United States and Canada and $1 million in other territories, for a worldwide total of $10.7 million.

In the United States and Canada, Piece by Piece was released alongside Terrifier 3, The Apprentice, My Hero Academia: You're Next, and the wide expansion of Saturday Night, and was projected to gross $3–5 million from 1,851 theaters in its opening weekend. The film made $1.5 million on its first day, including $450,000 from Thursday night previews. It went on to debut to $3.85 million, finishing fifth.

=== Critical response ===
On the review aggregator website Rotten Tomatoes, 83% of 126 critics' reviews are positive, with an average rating of 6.9/10. The website's consensus reads: "A highly unusual twist on the documentary format that somehow works seamlessly, this kaleidoscopic overview of Pharrell Williams' career is a lively testament to the power of self-belief." Metacritic, which uses a weighted average, assigned the film a score of 63 out of 100, based on 32 critics, indicating "generally favorable" reviews. Audiences polled by CinemaScore gave the film an average grade of "A" on an A+ to F scale, while those surveyed by PostTrak gave it an 84% overall positive score, with 63% saying they would definitely recommend it.

Deadline Hollywood's Pete Hammond wrote that the film "brings a freshness and originality to a docu format that makes it feel all new again." He appreciated Neville and Williams's use of the latter's synesthesia to express the Williams's songs in a way that makes it "a gorgeous musical fantasia". Hammond singled out the importance of the story beats, and named a sequence when "the ultra confident never-say-no side of the budding artist shows him going overboard in meetings with record label executives" one of his favorite parts of the film. Hammond concluded that "Williams and Neville have taken it apart and put it all back together to perfection." In a B− review, Entertainment Weekly's Maureen Lee Lenker called it "a fresh take on a talking heads documentary, recreating moments of Williams' past with Lego reenactments and visualizing Williams' relationship with music through colorful, glowing bricks." She hailed the Lego figures of Williams and his collaborators for giving the film a "playful, vibrant lens" at first, yet admitted that some sequences would have been better expressed by live action. Though she bemoaned the lacking of much insight into Williams's creative processes, she appreciated "the sweet story of how Pharrell devised his massive hit, "Happy," and the emotional response triggered by its success", among the brighter moments in the film.

Reviewing for IndieWire, Caleb Hammond found the best moments of the film in the opening, lauding the "well-executed gags and fantastical visual flourishes make creative use of the Lego framing", which he said proved it "much more than an empty stunt." Hammond cited a moment in which Williams and his producing partner Chad Hugo got stoned in a studio with Snoop Dogg and a retinue of Crips before coming up with the beat to "Drop It Like It's Hot" as a highlight. However, he was disappointed in Hugo's relegation to being a comedic background character, the film's lack of detail to Williams's creative moments, and the "glossing over" of revealing moments such as the reason why the Neptunes disbanded. He welcomed Williams's open admission of arrogance during a "dry spell" at a lower point in his career, though he felt it was "perfunctory" to move this along to the "more joyous" closing act. Assessing the film as visually inventive and affirmatively positive, he assigned it a B−. For Lovia Gyarkye of The Hollywood Reporter, Williams's characteristic irreverence meant that the film's concept of being built in Lego was not "a completely strange and off-kilter idea". She felt its representation of Williams's story was "sweet and inspiring", though she felt that the film being a celebrity biography "expectedly marked [it with] typical hagiographic evasiveness." She said that while Neville helped the film speak to self-acceptance, the true persuasion came with Williams's story moments. She felt that while vague, it was ultimately inspiring.

=== Accolades ===
Accolades for Piece By Piece
Award	Date of ceremony	Category	Recipient(s)	Result	Ref.
AARP Movies for Grownups Awards	January 11, 2025	Best Documentary	Piece by Piece	Nominated	
Annie Awards	February 8, 2025	Outstanding Achievement for Music in an Animated Feature Production	Pharrell Williams and Michael Andrews	Nominated	
Astra Creative Arts Awards	December 8, 2024	Best Original Song	"Piece by Piece"	Nominated	
Black Reel Awards	February 10, 2025	Outstanding Documentary Feature	Morgan Neville	Nominated	
Black Reel Awards	February 10, 2025	Outstanding Soundtrack	Piece by Piece	Nominated	
Black Reel Awards	February 10, 2025	Outstanding Original Song	"Piece by Piece"	Nominated	
Critics' Choice Documentary Awards	November 10, 2024	Best Documentary Feature	Piece by Piece	Nominated	
Critics' Choice Documentary Awards	November 10, 2024	Best Music Documentary	Piece by Piece	Nominated	
Grammy Awards	February 1, 2026	Best Music Film	Piece by Piece	Nominated	
Heartland Film Festival	2024	Truly Moving Picture Award	Piece by Piece	Won	
Hollywood Music in Media Awards	November 20, 2024	Original Song – Documentary	"Piece by Piece"	Nominated	
Hollywood Music in Media Awards	November 20, 2024	Music Documentary – Special Program	Piece by Piece	Won	
Hollywood Music in Media Awards	November 20, 2024	Soundtrack Album	Piece by Piece	Nominated	
NAACP Image Awards	February 22, 2025	Outstanding Animated Motion Picture	Piece by Piece	Nominated	
