= Rump Shaker (song) =

Single by Wreckx-n-Effect

from the album Hard or Smooth
- Released: August 25, 1992
- Recorded: 1992
- Genre: Hip hop; new jack swing
- Length: 5:13
- Label: MCA
- Songwriters: Aqil Davidson; Teddy Riley; Pharrell Williams; David Wynn; Anton Hollins; Darren Callis
- Producers: David Wynn; Teddy Riley; Ty Fyffe; Aqil Davidson; Markell Riley

Wreckx-n-Effect singles chronology
| "New Jack Swing" (1989) | "Rump Shaker" (1992) | "Knock-N-Boots" (1993) |

Music video
- "Rump Shaker" on YouTube

"Rump Shaker" is a song by American hip-hop group Wreckx-n-Effect. It was released in August 1992 by MCA Records as the lead single from their second album, Hard or Smooth (1992). It features production and guest vocals from Teddy Riley, brother of former Wreckx member Markell Riley. The song peaked at No. 2 on the US Billboard Hot 100 and Hot R&B Singles charts. It also reached No. 1 on the Hot Rap Singles chart and No. 9 on the Hot Dance Music/Club Play chart.

The chorus of the 2008 single, "Paper Planes" by British musician M.I.A. was widely speculated to be based on the chorus, although the song's writers are not credited.

In 2024, the song appeared on co-songwriter Pharrell Williams' soundtrack album Piece by Piece.

== Composition ==
"Rump Shaker" is built on a saxophone sample from the 1972 song "Darkest Light" by Lafayette Afro Rock Band and a drum sample from "Midnight Theme" by Manzel. Other samples include "Scratchin'" by the Magic Disco Machine and "Blues and Pants" by James Brown (the vocal "come on!"). Riley's "Rump Shaker (Teddy 2)" remix adds a bass and piano sample from "Blind Alley" by The Emotions as well as a vocal sample from "Stop, Look, Listen" by MC Lyte. Additionally, Teddy Riley's verse includes an allusion to the 1982 song "I Like It" by DeBarge, with the lines, "I like the way you comb your hair, I like the stylish clothes you wear, it's just the little things you do...".

The song opens with Teddy Riley chanting the chorus "All I wanna do is zooma-zoom-zoom-zoom and a boom-boom." Subsequent verses are rapped by Aqil Davidson, Teddy Riley, and Markell Riley. Teddy Riley's verse is notable for being written by his young protégé Pharrell Williams, later to achieve fame as a member of The Neptunes, N.E.R.D. and a solo artist. It was rumored that Pharrell, along with fellow future-Neptune Chad Hugo, contributed additional production work, but producer Ty Fyffe stated in a 2011 interview that he and Teddy Riley alone produced the song and that Pharrell's only contribution was lyrical.

== Critical reception ==
Iestyn George from NME wrote, "Would have been a definite Single of the Week contender if it weren't for the crass lyric. 'Rump Shaker' is a magnificently sleazy hip-hop groove co-written by Teddy Riley, the man to blame for inventing swingbeat. One for low-slung groovers everywhere."

== Music video ==
The accompanying music video for "Rump Shaker", depicting Wreckx-N-Effect and Riley hosting a party at Virginia Beach, received criticism for its alleged exploitation of women in bikinis. The video was banned from MTV.

== Track listing ==
=== A-side ===
1. "Rump Shaker" (Radio Remix) – 4:34
2. "Rump Shaker" (Bonus Beat) – 5:55
3. "Rump Shaker" (Percapella) – 3:19

=== B-side ===
1. "Rump Shaker" (Radio Mix) – 3:56
2. "Rump Shaker" (Teddy 2) – 6:00
3. "Rump Shaker" (Dub) – 6:00

== Charts ==
=== Weekly charts ===
| Chart (1992–1994) | Peak position |
|---|---|
| Australia (ARIA) | 10 |
| Canada Dance/Urban (RPM) | 1 |
| Europe (European Dance Radio) | 5 |
| Netherlands (Dutch Top 40 Tipparade) | 8 |
| Netherlands (Single Top 100) | 70 |
| New Zealand (Recorded Music NZ) | 11 |
| UK Singles (Official Charts) | 24 |
| UK Dance (Official Charts) | 25 |
| UK Dance (Music Week) | 25 |
| UK Club Chart (Music Week) | 11 |
| US Billboard Hot 100 | 2 |
| US Hot Dance Music/Club Play Singles (Billboard) | 9 |
| US Hot R&B/Hip-Hop Singles & Tracks (Billboard) | 2 |
| US Hot Rap Singles (Billboard) | 1 |
| US Rhythmic (Billboard) | 2 |

=== Year-end charts ===
| Chart (1993) | Position |
|---|---|
| Australia (ARIA) | 51 |
| New Zealand (Recorded Music NZ) | 44 |
| US Billboard Hot 100 | 9 |
| US Hot R&B/Hip-Hop Songs (Billboard) | 10 |
| US Cash Box Top 100 | 10 |

=== Decade-end charts ===
| Chart (1990–1999) | Position |
|---|---|
| US Billboard Hot 100 | 92 |

== Certifications ==
| Region | Certification | Certified units/sales |
|---|---|---|
| Australia (ARIA) | Gold | 35,000^{^} |
| United States (RIAA) | 2× Platinum | 2,000,000^{^} |
^{^} Shipments figures based on certification alone.
