= Raps New Generation =

Studio album by Wreckx-n-Effect
- Released: September 24, 1996
- Recorded: 1996
- Genre: Hip-hop; new jack swing
- Length: 62:27
- Label: MCA
- Producer: Teddy Riley; "Lil" Chris Smith; Markell Riley; Aqil Davidson

Wreckx-n-Effect chronology
Hard or Smooth (1992)	Raps New Generation (1996)

Professional ratings
Review scores
Source	Rating
AllMusic	link
Entertainment Weekly	C link

Raps New Generation is the third and final album released by Wreckx-n-Effect. It was released on September 24, 1996 for MCA Records and featured production from Teddy Riley, "Lil" Chris Smith, Markell Riley and Aqil Davidson. Raps New Generation was both a critical and commercial flop and was the group's only album not to chart on the Billboard 200. The single "Top Billin'" produced by "Lil" Chris Smith and Aqil Davidson however, made it to 38 on the Hot Rap Tracks.

== Track listing ==
1. "New Generation" – 2:11
2. "Tha Show" – 5:10
3. "Top Billin'" – 5:09
4. "Criminal Minded" – 6:45
5. "Harlem (Interlude)" – 1:42
6. "Planet Rock" – 3:59
7. "Move da Crowd" – 3:55
8. "Funky (Interlude)" – 0:40
9. "Funk Box" – 4:44
10. "Somethin' for da Radio" – 4:06
11. "Da Vapors" – 5:30
12. "Rap Acting School (Interlude)" – 1:45
13. "Boomin' System" – 4:36
14. "Grandma (Interlude)" – 2:09
15. "Sucka MC's" – 5:25
16. "It's Yours (Play on Playa)" – 4:22
17. "Outro" – 0:19
