= Hard or Smooth =

1992 studio album by Wreckx-n-Effect

Studio album by Wreckx-n-Effect
- Released: November 24, 1992
- Recorded: 1991–1992
- Studio: Future Recording Studios (Virginia Beach, Virginia)
- Genre: New jack swing; hip-hop
- Length: 46:04
- Label: MCA
- Producer: Teddy Riley; Ty Fyffe; David Wynn; Wreckx-n-Effect; Franklyn Grant; Menton L. Smith

Wreckx-n-Effect chronology
| Wrecks-n-Effect (1989) | Hard or Smooth (1992) | Raps New Generation (1996) |

Singles from Hard or Smooth
- 1. "Rump Shaker" Released: August 25, 1992

Professional ratings
Review scores
| Source | Rating |
|---|---|
| AllMusic | 4/5 stars |
| Robert Christgau | (choice cut) |
| Entertainment Weekly | C+ |
| The Independent | positive |
| Q | 3/5 stars |

Hard or Smooth is the second album released by Wreckx-n-Effect. It was released on November 24, 1992, by MCA Records, and featured production from Teddy Riley and Ty Fyffe, as well as Riley's engineers Franklyn Grant and David Wynn. This marked Wreckx-n-Effect's first album following the death of member Brandon Mitchell, who was fatally shot in 1990.

Hard or Smooth became the group's highest entry on the Billboard 200, where it debuted and peaked at number nine. Its lead single, "Rump Shaker", peaked at number two on both the Billboard Hot 100 and R&B/Hip-Hop Singles & Tracks charts, as well as number nine on the Hot Dance Music/Club Play. The album's second single, "Knock-N-Boots", peaked at number 72 on the Hot 100, while its third, "My Cutie", peaked at number 75 on the R&B/Hip-Hop chart. The fourth single, "Wreckx Shop", peaked at number 11 on the Hot Rap Tracks chart.

== Track listing ==
| No. | Title | Writer(s) | Length |
|---|---|---|---|
| 1. | "Rump Shaker" | Aqil Davidson; Markell Riley; Teddy Riley; David Wynn; Anton Hollins; Pharrell Williams | 5:13 |
| 2. | "New Jack Swing, Pt. 2" (Hard Version) | Davidson; T. Riley; M. Riley; Tyrone Fyffe; Williams; Franklyn Grant | 4:50 |
| 3. | "Wreckx Shop" | Davidson; Fyffe; T. Riley; M. Riley | 4:39 |
| 4. | "Knock-N-Boots" | Davidson; T. Riley; Menton L. Smith | 4:51 |
| 5. | "Here We Come" | Davidson; T. Riley; M. Riley | 4:27 |
| 6. | "Tell Me How You Feel" | Davidson; T. Riley | 4:59 |
| 7. | "My Cutie" | M. Smith; T. Riley | 4:07 |
| 8. | "Wreckx-N-Effect" | Davidson; T. Riley; M. Riley | 3:53 |
| 9. | "Ez Come Ez Go (What Goes Up Must Come Down)" | Davidson; T. Riley; David Wynn | 3:44 |
| 10. | "Hard" | T. Riley; Davidson; Fyffe | 2:04 |
| 11. | "Smooth" | M. Riley; Fyffe; T. Riley; Franklyn Grant; M. Smith | 2:59 |
| Total length: | | | 46:04 |

== Personnel ==
- Teddy Riley – all instruments, executive producer, mixing, recording engineer
- Tammy Lucas – background vocals
- Tyrone Fyffe – production, background vocals, scratches
- Franklyn Grant – production, recording engineer, mixing
- David Wynn – production, scratches
- Jean Marie Horvat – recording engineer, mixing
- Steve Thomas – scratches
- Darryl Shuler – background vocals
- Robert Nickerson – background vocals
- Dante Drew – background vocals
- Earl Thomas – assistant engineer
- Keston Wright – assistant engineer
- Steve Hall – mastering
- Todd Gray – photography
- Vartan – art direction
- DEY International – design

== Samples ==
"Rump Shaker"

- "Blues and Pants" by James Brown
- "Darkest Light" by Lafayette Afro Rock Band
- "Blind Alley" by the Emotions
- "Midnight Theme" by Manzel
- "I Like It" by DeBarge

"New Jack Swing, Pt. 2"

- "Woman to Woman" by Joe Cocker
- "The Bridge" by MC Shan
- "School Boy Crush" by Average White Band
- "Synthetic Substitution" by Melvin Bliss
- "Just Rhymin' wit Biz" by Biz Markie feat. Big Daddy Kane

"Wreckx Shop"

- "Papa Was Too" by Joe Tex
- "The Payback" by James Brown
- "The Big Beat" by Billy Squier

"Knock-N-Boots"

- "Think (About It)" by Lyn Collins
- "Get Up Offa That Thing" by James Brown
- "You'll Like It Too" by Funkadelic

"My Cutie"

- "Hihache" by Lafayette Afro Rock Band
- "Funky President (People It's Bad)" by James Brown

"Hard"

- "Hard to Handle" by Otis Redding
- "Synthetic Substitution" by Melvin Bliss

"Smooth"

- "It's a New Day" by Skull Snaps
- "Playing Your Game, Baby" by Barry White

== Charts ==
=== Weekly charts ===
| Chart (1992–1993) | Peak position |
|---|---|
| Australian Albums (ARIA) | 91 |
| US Billboard 200 | 9 |
| US Top R&B/Hip-Hop Albums (Billboard) | 6 |

=== Year-end charts ===
| Chart (1993) | Position |
|---|---|
| US Billboard 200 | 44 |
| US Top R&B/Hip-Hop Albums (Billboard) | 26 |

== Certifications ==
| Region | Certification | Certified units/sales |
|---|---|---|
| Canada (Music Canada) | Gold | 50,000^{^} |
| United States (RIAA) | Platinum | 1,000,000^{^} |
^{^} Shipments figures based on certification alone.
