= FUBU =

American hip hop apparel company

- Industry: Clothing, hip hop apparel
- Founded: 1989
- Headquarters: New York City, United States
- Products: Casual wear Sports wear Suit collection Eyewear; Belts; Shoes
- Owner: Daymond John; Carlton E. Brown; J. Alexander Martin; Keith C. Perrin
- Website: fubu.com

FUBU (/ˈfuːbuː/, FOO-boo) is an American hip hop apparel company. FUBU stands for "For Us, By Us" and was created when the founders were brainstorming for a catchy four-letter word following other big brands such as Nike and Coke. It includes casual wear, sports wear, a suit collection, eyewear, belts, fragrances, and shoes.

== History ==
The company was founded in 1992 when Daymond John mortgaged his home for $100,000, and with that seed money, the company's co-founders rebuilt half of his home as a factory while the other half remained living space. The clothing store Montego Bay, on Queens' Jamaica Avenue, was the first to carry the FUBU line. In the mid-1990s, high-end department store retailer Macy's started stocking FUBU apparel and, at one point, featured the four FUBU founders in a live, interactive window display in its flagship store on 34th Street.

FUBU founders attended the MAGIC men’s apparel show in Las Vegas with samples and got $300,000 worth of orders, but had no idea how to fulfill them. John’s mother suggested they advertise in the New York Times for an investor. In 1995, South Korean company Samsung answered a classified ad and invested in FUBU.

At its peak in 1998, FUBU grossed over $350 million in annual worldwide sales. FUBU has received several honors for their entrepreneurial achievements. These include two Congressional Awards, two NAACP Awards, the Pratt Institute Award, the Christopher Wallace Award, the Online Hip-Hop Award and a Citation of Honor from the Queens Borough President.

In 1997, LL Cool J starred in a commercial for Gap Inc. in which he wore a FUBU hat and incorporated the phrase "For Us, By Us" into his rap lyrics. The commercial's production team was unaware of the meaning behind LL's FUBU references until the advertisement aired. The subsequent controversy proved to be a tremendous publicity boost for both companies by simultaneously establishing FUBU in the mainstream, while giving Gap street credibility.

In 2003, FUBU mostly withdrew from the U.S. market, concentrating its efforts in Saudi Arabia, China, Korea, Japan and South Africa, while acquiring other apparel brands. In 2009, the company's annual revenue was around $200 million.

In 2010, FUBU relaunched its collection in the U.S., re-branding itself as FB Legacy.

In 2018, Puma, a footwear brand, began a collaboration with FUBU to create a number of shoes.

According to Complex, FUBU's decline occurred due to its over saturating the market, as John has publicly stated, "The biggest mistake we made with the brand was buying more inventory than we needed. This was around 2001." Since then, FUBU has continued to collaborate with various brands, including Pyer Moss and Urban Outfitters. In March 2019, FUBU announced a new partnership with Century 21.

In September 2020, Eye Candy Creations USA and FUBU announced their collaboration to design, create, produce and sell FUBU FRAMES, a sunglasses and optical collection worldwide.

=== Collection ===
The FUBU collection consists of T-shirts, rugby shirts, hockey and football jerseys, baseball caps, shoes, and denim jeans. All are embroidered with the FUBU logo. Most of the products, such as the jeans, are imported from around the world. FUBU has now expanded to include various lines such as Platinum FUBU, FUBU footwear for men and women, intimate apparel, active wear, swimwear, watches, FUBU suits, and FUBU tuxedos. The Platinum FUBU collection also includes the Fat Albert line where the FUBU founders first got approval from Bill Cosby.

== FUBU Records ==
From 2001 to 2003, FUBU established a record label, first releasing a compilation album entitled The Good Life in 2001 and then an album by the 54th Platoon entitled All or Nothin' in 2003. Both albums made it on the Billboard charts.

Year	Title	Chart positions	
Year	Title	U.S. Billboard 200	U.S. R&B
2001	The Good Life: Released: September 25, 2001; Label: FUBU/Universal	52	9

== In popular media ==
A FUBU shirt is an important plot element of the episode "FUBU" of the television series Atlanta.
