= Enjoy Yourself (A+ song) =

1998 single by A+

Single by A+

from the album Hempstead High
- Released: October 6, 1998
- Length: 3:41
- Label: Universal
- Songwriters: Germaine Williams, Walter Murphy
- Producer: Ty Fyffe

A+ singles chronology
"All I See" (1996)	"Enjoy Yourself" (1998)	"Bet She Don't Love You" (1999)

"Enjoy Yourself" is a song by American rapper A+, released as the only single from his second studio album, Hempstead High (1999). It samples the 1976 Walter Murphy song "A Fifth of Beethoven". Released in October 1998, the song reached the top five of the UK Singles Chart and number 63 on the US Billboard Hot 100. It was also commercially successful in several European countries and Japan.

== Charts ==
=== Weekly charts ===
Chart (1998–1999)	Peak position
Australia (ARIA)	26
Austria (Ö3 Austria Top 40)	25
Belgium (Ultratop 50 Flanders)	13
Belgium (Ultratop 50 Wallonia)	5
Europe (Eurochart Hot 100)	12
France (SNEP)	27
Germany (GfK)	30
Netherlands (Dutch Top 40)	3
Netherlands (Single Top 100)	4
New Zealand (Recorded Music NZ)	8
Norway (VG-lista)	6
Sweden (Sverigetopplistan)	19
Switzerland (Schweizer Hitparade)	19
UK Singles (OCC)	5
US Billboard Hot 100	63
US Hot R&B/Hip-Hop Songs (Billboard)	50
US Hot Rap Songs (Billboard)	11

=== Year-end charts ===
Chart (1999)	Position
Belgium (Ultratop 50 Flanders)	72
Belgium (Ultratop 50 Wallonia)	19
Europe (Eurochart Hot 100)	69
Netherlands (Dutch Top 40)	51
Netherlands (Single Top 100)	48
UK Singles (OCC)	95

== Release history ==
Region	Date	Format(s)	Label(s)	Ref.
United States	October 6, 1998	Rhythmic contemporary; urban radio	Universal	
Japan	January 21, 1999	CD	Universal	
United Kingdom	February 1, 1999	12-inch vinyl; CD; cassette	Universal	
