= Wrecks-n-Effect =

Studio album by Wrecks-n-Effect
- Released: September 12, 1989
- Recorded: 1988–1989
- Studio: Soundworks Studios (New York City); Hillside Studios (Englewood, New Jersey)
- Genre: New jack swing; hip-hop
- Label: Motown
- Producer: Markell Riley; Teddy Riley; David Guppy

Wrecks-n-Effect chronology
Wrecks-n-Effect (1989)	Hard or Smooth (1992)

Singles from Wrecks-n-Effect
- 1. "New Jack Swing" Released: November 22, 1989

Professional ratings
Review scores
Source	Rating
AllMusic	4/5 stars

Wrecks-n-Effect is the debut album released by Wrecks-n-Effect. It was released on September 12, 1989, by Motown Records and featured production from Markell Riley and Redhead Kingpin. The album cover bears a winged symbol like Guy, as it bears the genre's anthem. It was released after the departure of Keith KC.

The album achieved modest success on the Billboard charts, making it to No. 103 on the Billboard 200 and No. 16 on the Top R&B Albums chart. The two singles released found greater success; "New Jack Swing", which features new jack swing pioneer Teddy Riley, reached No. 1 on the Hot Rap Tracks chart, while "Juicy" made it to No. 6 on the same chart.

This is the only album by the group to include founding member Brandon Mitchell, who was shot and killed on August 8, 1990.

== Track listing ==
- All songs written by Aqil Davidson, Markell Riley and Brandon Mitchell.
1. "New Jack Swing" – (3:45)
2. "Leave the Mike Smokin'" – 4:00
3. "Juicy" – 5:10
4. "Club Head" – 3:56
5. "Soul Man" – 4:40
6. "Deep" – 1:50
7. "Wipe Your Sweat" – 4:37
8. "V-Man" – 4:50
9. "Peanut Butter" – 3:40
10. "Friends to the End" (featuring the Redhead Kingpin and Scoop Rock) – (4:55)
11. "Rock Steady" – 2:45

== Personnel ==
- Wrecks-n-Effect – primary artist, instrumentation
- Dave Way, Dae Bennett – recording engineers
- Teddy Riley – mixing, & rapping
- Herb Powers – mastering
- Gene Griffin – executive producer
