= New Jack Swing (song) =

Single by Wreckx-n-Effect

from the album Wrecks-n-Effect
- B-side: "Leave the Mike Smokin"
- Released: 1989
- Recorded: 1989
- Genre: New jack swing; hip hop
- Length: 3:45
- Label: Motown
- Songwriters: Aqil Davidson; Markell Riley; Brandon Mitchell
- Producer: Wrecks-n-Effect

Wreckx-n-Effect singles chronology
"Soul Man" (1989)	"New Jack Swing" (1989)	"Wipe Your Sweat" (1990)

"New Jack Swing" is the debut single by Wreckx-n-Effect (then called Wrecks-n-Effect) from their 1989 debut album Wrecks-n-Effect. It contains samples of the Village Callers' 1967 song "Hector", Parliament's 1975 song "Give Up the Funk", and James Brown's "Funky Drummer", "Funky President" and "Soul Power". The single reached number one on the Billboard Hot Rap Tracks chart. The music video, directed by Rich Murray, features cameos from Heavy D, Keith Sweat, Teddy Riley & Guy, Al B Sure and others.
