= Fabulous Marching Cavaliers =

Marching band in Virginia Beach, Virginia

- School: Princess Anne High School
- Location: Virginia Beach, Virginia, US
- Founded: 1969
- Director: John Boyd
- Members: 52
- Fight song: "Princess Anne High School Fight Song"
- Motto: Unity with Pride
- Website: https://pabands.org/

The Fabulous Marching Cavaliers, also abbreviated to FMC, is the marching band of Princess Anne High School in Virginia Beach, Virginia, United States.

== History ==
The FMC was founded in the 1950's and was called "Fabulous Marching Cavaliers" for the first time in 1967, being initially just called the Marching Cavaliers. According to Director John Boyd, as they came onto the field for a halftime show, the announcer, the 1965–1979 director Ron Collins, said: "Here come your fabulous Marching Cavaliers!" The name ended up sticking. Collins also came up with the band's motto, Unity with Pride.

In 1984, the FMC participated in the 58th Annual Macy's Thanksgiving Day Parade.

== Leadership ==
The current director of the FMC is John Boyd, who has led the band since 2001. He graduated with a bachelor's degree in musical education from Jacksonville State University in 1997, and he was formerly the director of bands at Henry E. Lackey High School in Indian Head, Maryland.

The FMC has a wide variety of student leadership positions, including drum major, field captain, and various lieutenants. There are also non-leadership positions, such as water crew captain and scaffolding crew captain.

== Shows ==
This is a list of the FMC's shows since 1997:

- 2026: Eden
- 2025: Pas De Deux
- 2024: Bazaar Harmonies
- 2023: 11.8.89 Tear Down The Wall
- 2022: Open Mic
- 2021: Dreams Not Yet Dreamt
- Spring 2021 COVID mitigation: The Crown
- 2019: From Many: One
- 2018: Watching You
- 2017: La Rosa
- 2016: Stargazer
- 2015: Against the Dark
- 2014: Nevermore
- 2013: Clones
- 2012: The Red Square
- 2011: Gold Rush
- 2010: Quartet
- 2009: In[ex]terior
- 2008: Symphony in Black
- 2007: Superstitious
- 2006: Con-zen-tric
- 2005: The Composition
- 2004: Emoticons
- 2003: Race!!!
- 2002: Music for the Dark Sky
- 2001: Images of Osiris
- 2000: The Music of Ron Nelson
- 1998: On the Waterfront
- 1997: Africa

== Awards ==
The FMC has won the Class AA State Championship award of the Virginia Marching Band Cooperative four times: first in 2018, and then in 2019, 2021, and 2023. In 2024 the FMC won the VMBC State Championships in Class AAA.

== Piece by Piece ==
In April 2023, The FMC was reached out to by Pharrell Williams, a former alumnus, in hopes of them performing for his new biographical film Piece by Piece. The band ended up recording the film's titular musical number, "Piece by Piece". The song released on Apple Music on September 6, 2024.

The FMC was invited up to New York City to perform for The Today Show, all paid for by Pharrell's team. They performed in the 8-o-clock hour, appearing on the show alongside Pharrell in an interview. The band performed two segments from the song "Piece by Piece," along with the song "Whack Whack".

Later that day, the band visited Jazz at the Lincoln Center to perform for the film's red carpet premier. Last-minute, they were given tickets to view the film alongside celebrities like Gwen Stefani and Jay-Z.
