= Respect My Conglomerate =

Single by Busta Rhymes featuring Jadakiss and Lil Wayne

from the album Back on My B.S. and The Last Kiss
- Released: April 4, 2009
- Recorded: 2008–09
- Genre: Hip hop
- Length: 3:34
- Label: Flipmode, Universal Motown, R.O.A.D Entertainment UK
- Songwriters: Trevor Smith, Jr., Bernard Edwards, Jr., Jason Phillips, Dwayne Carter, Debby Coda
- Producer: Focus...

Busta Rhymes singles chronology
"Hustler's Anthem '09" (2009)	"Respect My Conglomerate" (2009)	"World Go Round" (2009)

Jadakiss singles chronology
"By My Side" (2009)	"Respect My Conglomerate" (2009)	"Who's Real" (2009)

Lil Wayne singles chronology
"Death Wish" (2009)	"Respect My Conglomerate" (2009)	"Maybach Music 2" (2009)

"Respect My Conglomerate" is a song by American rapper Busta Rhymes, released on April 4, 2009, as the third single from Back on My B.S. (2009). It is also featured as a bonus track from Jadakiss's third album The Last Kiss (2009). The track features verses from fellow American rappers Jadakiss and Lil Wayne (Young Jeezy was featured in the original version), and features backing vocals by guest vocalist Debby Coda. The song was released digitally on April 4, 2009.

== Background ==
The song was produced by Aftermath staff producer Focus with executive production from Teriy Keys. The song was leaked on April 4, 2009. Though a version of the song containing only Busta Rhymes and Debby Coda was leaked on November 4, 2008, the updated version, leaked on January 9, 2009, features Young Jeezy and Jadakiss. However, the video version features Lil Wayne in place of Young Jeezy. the original version of the song was also included in downloadable-content for the video game Grand Theft Auto IV.

== Remixes ==
Eminem and Kon Artis made a freestyle to this song on the Tim Westwood show. Brit Award-winning UK artist Smurfie Syco also known as Teriy Keys, signed to Dizzee Rascal's Dirtee Stank Recordings also made a freestyle on the Tim Westwood show. On YouTube you can find a version that Kid Cudi has rapped over. Cosculluela made a remix to this song on the mixtape I Run This Shit By DJ Motion which featured Nego Flow, Don Omar and Daddy Yankee along with the backing vocalist Debby Coda. "Respect My Conglomerate (Part 2)" was released by Busta Rhymes featuring Fabolous, Jadakiss and Styles P, on November 18, 2015.

== Music video ==
A behind-the-scenes footage of the music video was leaked by film director Chris Robinson, on his Robot Films website on March 30, 2009. Robinson has directed "Pass The Courvoisier Part II", "I Know What You Want", "In the Ghetto" and "We Made It", for Busta Rhymes in the past. The video features cameo appearances from Xzibit, Tyrese, Raekwon, Spliff Star, Adam Rodriguez, Idris Elba, Jackie Long, David Banner and Jay Sean. The video was premiered on 106 & Park on April 30, 2009. The video was listed as #97 on BET's Notarized: Top 100 Videos of 2009 countdown.

== Track listing ==
U.S. Promo CD single

(Released: January 2009)

1. "Respect My Conglomerate" (Dirty) (feat. Young Jeezy & Jadakiss)
2. "Respect My Conglomerate" (Clean) (feat. Young Jeezy & Jadakiss)
3. "Respect My Conglomerate" (Instrumental)

== Charts ==
Chart (2009)	Peak position
US Bubbling Under Hot 100 (Billboard)	22
US Hot R&B/Hip-Hop Songs (Billboard)	82
