= World Go Round =

Single by Busta Rhymes featuring Estelle

from the album Back on My B.S.
- Released: April 6, 2009
- Recorded: 2009
- Genre: East Coast hip hop
- Length: 3:50
- Label: Flipmode, Universal Motown
- Songwriters: Trevor Smith, Jr.; David Drew; Chasity Nwagbara
- Producer: Jelly Roll

Busta Rhymes singles chronology
"Respect My Conglomerate" (2009)	"World Go Round" (2009)	"C'mon (Catch 'Em by Surprise)" (2011)

Estelle singles chronology
"Star" (2009)	"World Go Round" (2009)	"One Love" (2009)

"World Go Round" is the fourth single from Busta Rhymes' album Back on My B.S. and is produced by Jelly Roll. The song features British singer Estelle, and was released in France on April 6, 2009 by Universal Records due to the heavy rotation of a leaked version (that featured vocals from a different, unidentifiable singer) of the track on the French R&B/hip hop radio station Skyrock. The song was released in the UK on July 13, 2009.

The song uses a riff similar to "Sweet Dreams (Are Made of This)" by Eurythmics.

== Music video ==
The video features both Busta Rhymes and Estelle in various backgrounds surrounded by Japanese, Russian, and Portuguese lettering.

== Charts ==
Chart (2009)	Peak position
France Digital Singles (SNEP)	20
France Physical Singles (SNEP)	23
Ireland (IRMA)	25
UK Singles (Official Charts Company)	66
