= The Latch-Key Child =

Studio album by A+
- Released: August 27, 1996
- Recorded: 1995–1996
- Studios: Battery Studios (New York, NY)
- Genre: Hip hop
- Length: 51:38
- Label: Universal
- Producers: Kedar Massenburg (exec.); Buckwild; Carl Carr; Fabian Hamilton; Ike Lee; Miladon; Smith Brothers Entertainment

A+ chronology
The Latch-Key Child (1996)	Hempstead High (1999)

Singles from The Latch-Key Child
- 1. "All I See" Released: July 16, 1996

Professional ratings
Review scores
Source	Rating
AllMusic	3/5 stars
RapReviews	8/10

The Latch-Key Child is the debut studio album by American rapper A+. It was released on August 27, 1996, through Kedar Entertainment/Universal Records. Recording sessions took place at Battery Studios in New York. Production was handled by Smith Brothers Entertainment, Buckwild, Fabian Hamilton, Miladon, Carl Carr and Ike Lee, with Kedar Massenburg serving as the executive producer. It features guest appearances from AZ, Prodigy, Q-Tip and Shakira Atily. The album peaked at #36 on the Top R&B/Hip-Hop Albums and #17 on the Top Heatseekers in the United States.

== Track listing ==
No.	Title	Writer(s)	Producer(s)	Length
1.	"Next Level (Intro) / Enter Hempstead"	Andre Levins; James Smith; Charles Smith	Fabian Hamilton; Smith Bros. Entertainment	4:00
2.	"Move On"	Levins; J. Smith; C. Smith; Cynthia Girty; Arenita Walker; Rudolph Isley; Ronald Isley; Marvin Isley; Ernie Isley; Chris Jasper	Smith Bros. Entertainment	4:34
3.	"Me & My Microphone" (featuring Q-Tip)	Levins; J. Smith	Buckwild	3:33
4.	"All I See" (featuring Shakira Atily)	Levins; Carl Carr; J. Smith; C. Smith; Rodney Jerkins	Carl Carr	4:24
5.	"Gusto" (featuring Prodigy)	Levins; Albert Johnson; K. Simpkins; J. Smith; C. Smith	Miladon	5:11
6.	"Hard Times"	Levins; J. Smith; C. Smith; Frank Wilson; Pamela Sawyer	Smith Bros. Entertainment	3:49
7.	"A+Z" (featuring AZ)	Levins; Anthony Cruz; J. Smith; C. Smith; Harold Johnson	Ike Lee	4:19
8.	"Wanna Be Rich"	Levins; J. Smith; C. Smith	Buckwild	4:11
9.	"My Thing"	Levins; J. Smith; C. Smith	Smith Bros. Entertainment	3:43
10.	"Parkside Coalition"	Levins; K. Simpkins; J. Smith; C. Smith	Miladon; Smith Bros. Entertainment	4:23
11.	"Party Joint"	Levins; J. Smith; C. Smith; James Harris III; Terry Lewis	Smith Bros. Entertainment	4:11
12.	"Alpha 2 Omega"	Levins; C. Smith	Smith Bros. Entertainment	4:15
13.	"Shout It Out (Outro)"	Levins	Fabian Hamilton	1:05
Total length:				51:38

Sample credits

- Track 2 contains samples of "Stop Before We Start" written by Cynthia Girty and Arenita Walker and performed by Bobby Womack & Candi Staton and "Voyage to Atlantis" written by Rudolph Isley, Ronald Isley, Marvin Isley, Ernie Isley and Chris Jasper and performed by The Isley Brothers
- Track 6 contains elements of "Touch" written by Pamela Sawyer and Frank Wilson
- Track 7 contains elements of "Let's Get Closer" written by Harold Johnson
- Track 9 contains a sample of "Living Without You" written by Michael Hepburn and Fred Reed Jr. and performed by Pleasure
- Track 11 contains a sample of "No One's Gonna Love You" written by Jimmy Jam and Terry Lewis and performed by The S.O.S. Band

== Personnel ==
- Andre "A+" Levins – main artist
- Jonathan "Q-Tip" Davis – vocals (track 3)
- Shakira Atily – vocals (track 4)
- Albert "Prodigy" Johnson – vocals (track 5)
- Anthony "AZ" Cruz – vocals (track 7)
- Fabian Hamilton – producer (tracks: 1, 14)
- Charles Smith – producer (tracks: 1, 2, 6, 9–12)
- Joseph Smith – producer (tracks: 1, 2, 6, 9–12)
- Elliot Smith – producer (tracks: 1, 2, 6, 9–12)
- Anthony "Buckwild" Best – producer (tracks: 3, 8)
- Carl Carr – producer (track 4)
- K. "Miladon" Simpkins – producer (tracks: 5, 10)
- Ike Lee – producer (track 7)
- Michael Gilbert – recording, mixing (tracks: 4, 12)
- Tim Latham – mixing (tracks: 1, 3, 5, 7, 8, 10, 13)
- Daniel Wierup – mixing assistant (tracks: 1, 3, 5, 8, 10, 13), recording assistant (track 4), tracking assistant engineering
- Jed Hackett – recording (track 2), mixing assistant (tracks: 2, 11, 12), recording assistant (track 12), additional tracking engineering
- Russell Elevado – mixing (tracks: 2, 6, 9, 11)
- Michael Shinn – additional drum programming (track 4)
- John Kogan – recording (track 4)
- Charles McCrorey – recording assistant (tracks: 4, 12), mixing assistant (track 7), tracking assistant engineering
- Sharon Kearney – recording assistant (tracks: 5, 10)
- Martin Czembor – mixing assistant (tracks: 6, 9), additional tracking engineering
- Tim Donovan – recording (track 12), additional tracking engineering
- Aidania Gonzalez – tracking assistant engineering
- Kedar Massenburg – executive producer
- The Drawing Board – art direction, design
- Michael Lavine – photography
- Alita Carter – sample clearances
- Group Home Entertainment, Inc – management

== Charts ==
Chart (1996)	Peak position
US Top R&B/Hip-Hop Albums (Billboard)	36
US Heatseekers Albums (Billboard)	17
