= All or Nothin' (54th Platoon album) =

Studio album by 54th Platoon
- Released: May 6, 2003
- Recorded: 2001–2002
- Genre: Hip hop
- Length: 41:01
- Label: FUBU
- Producer: Carl Brown (exec.); Keith Perrin (co-exec.); Jason Brown; Lil' Jon; Ty Fyffe; Antwan "Amadeus" Thompson; Brian "BK" Coleman; Epitome; Megahertz; N.O. Joe

Professional ratings
Review scores
Source	Rating
AllMusic	3/5 stars
RapReviews	6/10

All or Nothin' (stylized as All or N.O.thin) is an album by American rap group 54th Platoon. It was released on May 6, 2003 as the only studio album released through the short-lived FUBU Records. Production was handled by eight record producers, including Lil Jon, Ty Fyffe, Megahertz and N.O. Joe. It features guest appearances from 8Ball, Jason Peele, Jazze Pha and Nicole Wray.

Spawning two promotional singles, "Holdin It Down" and "She Like", the album peaked at No. 128 on the Billboard 200 and No. 21 on the Top R&B/Hip-Hop Albums chart in the United States.

== Track listing ==
No.	Title	Producer(s)	Length
1.	"Intro"		1:31
2.	"Turn It Up"	Epitome; Brian "BK" Coleman	2:32
3.	"Hold'n It Down"	Lil' Jon	4:02
4.	"Interlude: Vacation"		1:06
5.	"V.S.O.P."	Antwan "Amadeus" Thompson	3:47
6.	"Nine"	Ty Fyffe	3:04
7.	"Interlude: Phone Call"		0:51
8.	"Don't"	Ty Fyffe	3:05
9.	"Interlude: Ambulance"		0:49
10.	"Mama Don't Cry" (featuring Nicole Wray)	Jason Brown	4:33
11.	"She Like"	Jason Brown	3:57
12.	"Pimpin" (featuring 8Ball and Jazze Pha)	Lil' Jon	4:14
13.	"Interlude: Stole Somethin"		0:33
14.	"Big Wheels" (featuring Jason Peele)	Megahertz	3:25
15.	"You Don't Wanna"	N.O. Joe	3:32
Total length:			41:01

== Charts ==
Chart (2003)	Peak position
US Billboard 200	128
US Top R&B/Hip-Hop Albums (Billboard)	21
US Independent Albums (Billboard)	6
US Heatseekers Albums (Billboard)	2
