= Hempstead High =

1999 studio album by A+

Studio album by A+
- Released: February 23, 1999
- Recorded: 1997–1998
- Studio: Unique Recording Studios (New York, NY); Battery Studios (New York, NY); Urban House Studios, Inc (Houston, TX)
- Genre: Hip hop
- Length: 53:52
- Label: Universal
- Producer: Kedar Massenburg (exec.); Bink!; DJ Clark Kent; Lil' Shawn; Mo-Suave-A; Smith Brothers Entertainment; Ty Fyffe

A+ chronology
The Latch-Key Child (1996)	Hempstead High (1999)

Singles from Hempstead High
- 1. "Enjoy Yourself" Released: 1998

Professional ratings
Review scores
Source	Rating
AllMusic	2.5/5 stars
Entertainment Weekly	C−
RapReviews	7/10
The Source	3/5 stars
St. Petersburg Times	C

Hempstead High is the second studio album by American rapper A+. It was released in 1999 through Kedar Entertainment/Universal Records. Recording sessions took place at Unique Recording Studios and Battery Studios in New York and at Urban House Studios, Inc. in Houston. Production was handled by Bink!, DJ Clark Kent, Lil' Shawn, Mo-Suave-A, Smith Brothers Entertainment and Ty Fyffe, with Kedar Massenburg serving as executive producer. It features guest appearances from Canibus, Cardan, Chico DeBarge, Erykah Badu, MJG, Psycho Drama and the Lost Boyz. The album peaked at #60 on the Top R&B/Hip-Hop Albums and #19 on the Top Heatseekers in the United States, and at number 72 in the Netherlands.

== Critical reception ==
Vibe thought that A+ "can't decide whether he's a hardcore man or a playful youth on his understated sophomore album". The Plain Dealer wrote: "By the time the disc reaches the scary 'Staggering and Stuttering' with Psycho Drama, A+ establishes his versatility and assured, confident flow".

== Track listing ==
No.	Title	Writer(s)	Producer(s)	Length
1.	"Intro (Classroom)" (featuring Lawrence Page)		Smith Bros. Entertainment	1:51
2.	"Enjoy Yourself"	Germaine Williams; Walter Murphy	Sugarless	3:38
3.	"Up Top New York" (featuring Mr. Cheeks)	Andre Levins; Terrance Kelly; Roosevelt Harrell III; Joseph Broussard; Ralph Williams; Carrol Washington	Bink!	4:56
4.	"Gotta Have It"	Williams; Rodolfo Franklin; Hamilton Bohannon	DJ Clark Kent	4:09
5.	"Boyz 2 Men" (featuring the Lost Boyz and Canibus)	Williams; Kelly; Harrell III	Bink!	3:54
6.	"Watcha Weigh Me" (featuring MJG)	Marlon Goodwin; Triston Jones	Mo-Suave-A Productions	4:11
7.	"Understand the Game" (featuring Erykah Badu)	Erica Wright; Tyrone Wilkins; Harrell III	Bink!	3:48
8.	"Don't Make Me Wait"	Levins; Wilkins; Bernard Fowler	Little Shawn	3:57
9.	"Interlude - The Score"		Smith Bros. Entertainment	1:09
10.	"It's on You" (featuring Chico DeBarge)	Charles Smith; Joseph Smith; Kenneth Gamble; Leon Huff; Phillip Pugh; Sherman Marshall	Smith Bros. Entertainment	4:31
11.	"What the Deal" (featuring Cardan)	Levins; Pierre Jones; Harrell III	Bink!	3:37
12.	"Price of Fame"	C. Smith; J. Smith; Nick Martinelli	Smith Bros. Entertainment; DJ Clark Kent (add.)	3:35
13.	"Staggering and Stuttering" (featuring Psycho Drama)	Jeffrey Robinson; Akula Segal; T. Jones	Mo-Suave-A Productions	5:18
14.	"Parkside Gardens"	Levins; Harrell III	Bink!	5:18
Total length:				53:52

Sample credits

- Track 2 contains a sample from "A Fifth of Beethoven" written and performed by Walter Murphy
- Track 3 contains samples from "Mr. Big Stuff" written by Joseph Broussard, Ralph Williams and Carrol Washington and performed by Jean Knight
- Track 4 contains a sample of "Singing This Song for My Mother" written and performed by Hamilton Bohannon
- Track 8 contains a sample of "Don't Make Me Wait" written by Bernard Fowler and B. Williams and performed by the Peech Boys
- Track 10 contains an interpolation of "When Somebody Loves You Back" written by Kenneth Gamble and Leon Huff and samples from "I Found Love (When I Found You)" written by Phillip Pugh and Sherman Marshall and performed by The Spinners
- Track 12 contains a sample of "Let Me Be the One" written by Nick Martinelli and performed by Five Star

== Personnel ==
- Andre "A+" Levins – main artist
- Terrance "Mr. Cheeks" Kelly – featured artist (tracks: 3, 5)
- Germaine "Canibus" Williams – featured artist (track 5)
- Marlon "MJG" Goodwin – featured artist (track 6)
- Erica "Erykah Badu" Wright – featured artist (track 7)
- Jonathan Arthur "Chico" DeBarge – featured artist (track 10)
- Pierre "Cardan" Jones – featured artist (track 11)
- Jeffery "Buk" Robinson – featured artist (track 13)
- Akula "Psyde" Segal – featured artist (track 13)
- Lawrence Page – performer (track 1)
- Keanna Henson – backing vocals (track 2)
- Crystal Johnson – backing vocals (track 5)
- Eric "E-Bass" Johnson – bass (track 3)
- Robert "Storm" Jordan – Rhodes electric piano and strings (track 5)
- Mike Cerullo – guitar (track 7)
- Charles Smith – producer (tracks: 1, 9, 10, 12), associate executive producer
- Joseph Smith – producer (tracks: 1, 9, 10, 12), associate executive producer
- Tyrone Fyffe – producer (track 2)
- Roosevelt "Bink!" Harrell III – producer (tracks: 3, 5, 7, 11, 14)
- Rodolfo "DJ Clark Kent" Franklin – producer (track 4), additional producer (track 12), mixing (track 2)
- Mo-Suave-A Productions, Inc. – producers (tracks: 6, 13)
- Tyrone "Shawn Pen" Wilkins – producer (track 8)
- Ed Miller – recording (tracks: 1, 3, 5, 7, 9–11, 12, 14), mixing (tracks: 5, 7, 11)
- Tim Donovan – recording (track 2)
- Kenny Ortiz – recording (tracks: 4, 8), mixing (tracks: 4, 8, 10, 12)
- Tristan "T-Mix" Jones – recording (track 6)
- Neil Jones – recording (track 13)
- Cuz – mixing (track 2)
- Leo "Swift" Morris – mixing (track 3)
- Simon "Crazy C" Cullins – mixing (tracks: 6, 13)
- James Hoover – mixing (tracks: 6, 13)
- Tony Smalios – mixing (track 14)
- Dana Walsh – engineering assistant (track 2)
- Denise Barbarita – engineering assistant (track 3)
- Daniel Wierup – engineering assistant (track 8)
- Tom Coyne – mastering
- Kedar Massenburg – executive producer
- Sandie Lee Drake – art direction
- Susan Bibeau – design
- Stephen McBride – photography
- Ray Copeland – management

== Charts ==
Chart (1999)	Peak position
Dutch Albums (Album Top 100)	72
US Top R&B/Hip-Hop Albums (Billboard)	60
US Heatseekers Albums (Billboard)	19
