= All I See (A+ song) =

Single by A+

from the album The Latch-Key Child
- Released: July 16, 1996
- Genre: Hip hop; R&B
- Length: 4:26
- Label: Universal Records
- Songwriters: Carl Carr, Rodney Jerkins, Smith Brothers Entertainment
- Producers: Charles McCorey, Daniel Wierup, Jed Hackett

"All I See" is a song by A+. The song samples Shalamar's "This Is for the Lover in You".

Released as the lead single from The Latch-Key Child, it peaked at number 43 on the Hot Dance Music/Maxi-Singles Sales chart, number 29 on the Hot R&B/Hip-Hop Singles & Tracks, number 66 on the Billboard Hot 100 chart, where it stayed for 14 weeks and number 7 on the Hot Rap Songs chart. In addition, it made heavy rotation on MTV, BET and The Box.

== Critical reception ==
Pete T. of Rapreviews.com called the song "aimed for a young and even female listenership but doesn't undermine the rest of the album; in fact, it's a rather likable track and a welcome display of versatility from the normally dark narrator".

== Charts ==
Chart (1996)	Peak position
US Billboard Hot 100	66
US Hot Dance Music/Maxi-Singles Sales (Billboard)	43
US Hot R&B/Hip-Hop Singles & Tracks (Billboard)	29
US Cash Box Top 100	59
