= Hustler's Anthem '09 =

Single by Busta Rhymes featuring T-Pain

from the album Back on My B.S.
- Released: February 10, 2009
- Recorded: 2008
- Genre: Hip hop
- Length: 4:29
- Label: Flipmode, Universal Motown
- Songwriter(s): Trevor Smith, Jr., Faheem Rasheed Najm
- Producer(s): Ty Fyffe

Busta Rhymes singles chronology
"Rotate" (2008)	"Hustler's Anthem '09" (2009)	"Respect My Conglomerate" (2009)

T-Pain singles chronology
"I'm on a Boat" (2009)	"Hustler's Anthem '09" (2009)	"Feel It" (2009)

"Hustler's Anthem '09" is a song written by Busta Rhymes. Produced by Ty Fyffe, it is the second single from Busta Rhymes' album Back on My B.S.. It features American singer T-Pain. The song was released in digital format on February 10, 2009, by Universal Motown.

== Background ==
"Hustler's Anthem '09" was leaked early January 2009. It officially became the second single of Back on My B.S. on February 10, 2009.

== Remixes ==
The official remix was released featuring T-Pain, Ryan Leslie, OJ Da Juiceman, and Gucci Mane.

== Music video ==
The music video was released April 6, 2009 on 106 & Park when Busta Rhymes himself came and introduced it. It's shot through fishlens with cameos of Spliff Star. A trailer for the music video was released on March 24, 2009. It was directed by famous music video director Hype Williams who has directed many of Busta Rhymes' music videos such as "Woo Hah!! Got You All in Check", "Put Your Hands Where My Eyes Could See", "Dangerous", "Gimme Some More" and "What's It Gonna Be?!".

== Formats and track listings ==
Digital download

(Released: February 10, 2009)
Explicit

1. "Hustler's Anthem '09" – 4:29

Clean

1. "Hustler's Anthem '09" – 3:58

U.S. Promo CDS

(Released: February 15, 2009)

1. "Hustler's Anthem '09" (Dirty) – 04:29
2. "Hustler's Anthem '09" (Clean) – 04:29
3. "Hustler's Anthem '09" (Instrumental) – 04:24
4. "Hustler's Anthem '09" (Acapella) – 04:29

== Charts ==
Chart (2009)	Peak position
Canada (Canadian Hot 100)	73
US Hot R&B/Hip-Hop Songs (Billboard)	51
US Hot Rap Songs (Billboard)	19
US Rhythmic (Billboard)	35
