= Back on My B.S. =

Studio album by Busta Rhymes
- Released: May 19, 2009
- Recorded: 2007–2009
- Genres: East Coast hip hop; hardcore hip hop
- Length: 54:04
- Labels: Flipmode; Violator; Monami; Universal Motown
- Producers: Busta Rhymes (exec.); Cool & Dre; Danja; DJ Scratch; Dready Beats; Focus...; Jelly Roll; King Karnov; Mr. Porter; Needlz; Pharrell Williams; Ron Browz; Ty Fyffe

Busta Rhymes chronology
| The Big Bang (2006) | Back on My B.S. (2009) | Year of the Dragon (2012) |

Singles from Back on My B.S.
- 1. "Arab Money" Released: October 14, 2008; 2. "Hustler's Anthem '09" Released: February 10, 2009; 3. "Respect My Conglomerate" Released: April 4, 2009; 4. "World Go Round" Released: July 7, 2009

Back on My B.S. is the eighth studio album by American rapper Busta Rhymes. It was released on May 19, 2009, through Flipmode and Universal Motown. The production on the album was handled by multiple producers including Pharrell Williams, DJ Scratch, Danja and Cool & Dre among others. The album also features guest appearances by T-Pain, Jamie Foxx, Akon, Lil Wayne, Mary J. Blige, T.I. and many more.

Back on My B.S. was supported by four singles: "Arab Money", "Hustler's Anthem '09", "Respect My Conglomerate" and "World Go Round". The album received mixed reviews from music critics and moderate commercial success. The album debuted at number five on the US Billboard 200 chart, selling 59,000 copies in its first week.

== Background ==
The album was originally going to be called Before Hell Freezes Over, but went through several name changes (including Back on My Bullshit, Blessed and B.O.M.B.) before being finalized as Back on My B.S.. The release date changed many times, mostly due to Busta Rhymes' release from Aftermath Entertainment and Interscope Records. The album was originally supposed to come out as early as December 4, 2007 but went through many projected release dates before an official release date of May 19, 2009.

== Release and promotion ==
During an interview with MTV News, Busta Rhymes mentioned that he will be working with longtime collaborators as well as some people he's never had the chance to work with before. He said:

You're gonna get your traditional Busta Rhymes and Pharrell collabo. My man Focus from the Aftermath crew; Dr. Dre; the late, great J Dilla got work on the album. It's gonna be great — look forward to the new bang-out.

In May 2008, news spread of a tracklisting confirming these tracks, stating the album would be titled Blessed and would feature a holographic cover.

During an interview with FLOW 93.5 in Toronto, Kardinal Offishall stated that he would appear on a track which would also feature Akon. Kardinal Offishall did not appear on the album, but Akon did. At a private listening session in Manhattan, Busta announced that guest appearances on the album would include Mary J. Blige, Jamie Foxx, Common, Nicole Scherzinger, Akon, T.I., Lil Wayne, Ludacris, The Game, American rock band Linkin Park, T-Pain, and Swizz Beatz.

The first single was originally going to be "Watch Ya Mouth" featuring Swizz Beatz, but then it was changed and will not appear on the album and was dubbed as a street single. "Don't Touch Me (Throw da Water on 'em)" then became the first single, but was changed and simply became a promo single. Although not confirmed to be on the final release of the album, Rhymes teamed up with Travis Barker for one of the latter's underground hit "rock remixes", with the homemade YouTube video having more views than the official single video. Linkin Park also collaborated on the second promo single, "We Made It". The video was shot April 15, 2008. The video for "We Made It" premiered on BET and Yahoo! Music on April 29, 2008. Pharrell did 3 tracks with Busta Rhymes for his new album, one including "G-Stro" "G-Stro" did not appear on the album, but was included on the Fast & Furious soundtrack. Only one made the final cut.

Busta Rhymes premiered the video for "I Got Bass" on November 24 and has cameos from DJ Scratch, Bangladesh, Fabolous, Alfamega, Swizz Beatz and the Flipmode Squad. Hip Hop producer/singer Ron Browz collaborated on the song "Arab Money". The music video debuted on BET's 106 & Park on December 2. It features cameos from Rick Ross, Spliff Star, DJ Drama, Jim Jones, Juelz Santana, DJ Khaled, Akon, Sean Paul, Soulja Boy Tell 'Em, Kardinal Offishall, Ace Hood, Shawty Lo, Paul Wall among many others. The first part of the official remix of "Arab Money" was leaked on November 27. It features Diddy, Ron Browz, Swizz Beatz, T-Pain, Akon and Lil Wayne. The second part was leaked on December 13 and features Ron Browz, Rick Ross, Reek Da Villian, Spliff Star, N.O.R.E. and Red Cafe. The third part was leaked on December 20 features Ron Browz, Juelz Santana, Jim Jones and Jadakiss. All three are the official remix of "Arab Money."

A video for "Respect My Conglomerate" has been shot and the song has been released as a promo CD single. The song is also rumored to be the official third single. However, the video version features Lil Wayne in place of Young Jeezy. The track is featured as an iTunes bonus track on Jadakiss' The Last Kiss. Upon release, both "We Made It" with Linkin Park and "Don't Touch Me (Throw da Water on 'em)" were not included on the final version of the album. Due to its graphic nature, the track "Kill Dem", which features Pharrell and Tosh, is not speculated to be a single. However, the song has received airplay on New York radio stations. The fourth single is "World Go Round", featuring Estelle. The video of the song has been shot and released. The album is notable for being Busta Rhymes' first solo album in 11 years not to feature production from J Dilla, who died in 2006.

== Critical reception ==
Professional ratings
Aggregate scores
| Source | Rating |
|---|---|
| Metacritic | 60/100 |
Review scores
| Source | Rating |
| AllMusic | 3/5 stars |
| Entertainment Weekly | C+ |
| HipHopDX | 2/5 |
| Los Angeles Times | 2.5/4 stars |
| Mojo | 4/5 stars |
| NME | 3/5 stars |
| RapReviews | 7.5/10 |
| Slant | 2/5 stars |
| Spin | 5/10 |
| The Telegraph | 4/5 stars |

Critical response to the album was mixed. According to Metacritic, the album scored a 60 out of 100, indicating "mixed or average reviews". Entertainment Weekly wrote an unfavorable review, saying, "All things considered, Busta should probably try including a little less B.S. the next time he comes back." Slant Magazine also wrote a negative review, stating that, "More often than not, Busta is content to recycle well-worn material, hoping that enough polish and guest-star participation will wick away the album's dusty content. They don't, leaving B.S. as nothing more than filler." The album was named the most "disappointing album" of 2009 by Hip-Hop news website HipHopDX. However XXL, a hip-hop magazine, gave the album a high rating of XL (4 out of five stars), stating that, "Bussa-Bus stays true to form, meshing the same witty concepts and dope production he has been known for his entire career."

== Commercial performance ==
Back on My B.S. debuted at number five on the US Billboard 200 chart, selling 59,000 copies in its first week. This became Busta Rhymes' sixth US top-ten album.

== Track listing ==
The track listing was confirmed by two major retail sites.

| No. | Title | Writer(s) | Producer(s) | Length |
|---|---|---|---|---|
| 1. | "Wheel of Fortune" | Trevor Smith; George Spivey; El DeBarge; William DeBarge; Etterlene Jordan; Richard Walters | DJ Scratch | 3:24 |
| 2. | "Give Em What They Askin For" | Smith; Rondell Turner | Ron Browz | 3:24 |
| 3. | "Respect My Conglomerate" (featuring Lil Wayne and Jadakiss) | Smith; Bernard Edwards, Jr.; Dwayne Carter; Jason Phillips | Focus... | 3:34 |
| 4. | "Shoot for the Moon" | Smith; Nathaniel Hill | Danja | 3:20 |
| 5. | "Hustler's Anthem '09" (featuring T-Pain) | Smith; Tyrone Fyffe; Faheem Najm | Ty Fyffe | 4:29 |
| 6. | "Kill Dem" (featuring Pharrell Williams and Tosh) | Smith; Pharrell Williams | Pharrell Williams | 3:48 |
| 7. | "Arab Money" (featuring Ron Browz) | Smith; Turner | Ron Browz | 2:45 |
| 8. | "I'm a Go and Get My..." (featuring Mike Epps) | Smith; Spivey | DJ Scratch | 4:54 |
| 9. | "We Want In" (featuring Ron Browz, Spliff Star and Show Money) | Smith; William Lewis; Rashawn Woolard | King Karnov | 3:11 |
| 10. | "We Miss You" (featuring DeMarco and Jelly Roll) | Smith; Khari Cain | Needlz | 5:02 |
| 11. | "Sugar" (featuring Jelly Roll) | Smith; David Drew; Carlton Johnson | Jelly Roll | 4:05 |
| 12. | "Don't Believe Em" (featuring Akon and T.I.) | Smith; Aliaume Thiam; Andre Lyon; Marcello Valenzano | Cool & Dre | 3:49 |
| 13. | "Decision" (featuring Jamie Foxx, Mary J. Blige, John Legend and Common) | Smith; Denaun Porter; Lonnie Lynn | Mr. Porter | 4:28 |
| 14. | "World Go Round" (featuring Estelle) | Smith; Drew; Chasity Nwagbara | Jelly Roll | 3:51 |
| Total length: | | | | 54:04 |

iTunes bonus tracks
| No. | Title | Producer(s) | Length |
|---|---|---|---|
| 15. | "How You Really Want It" (featuring Jesse West) | Dready Beats | 4:57 |
| 16. | "If You Don't Know Now You Know" (featuring Big Tigger) | Focus... | 4:59 |
| Total length: | | | 1:04:00 |

Japan bonus tracks
| No. | Title | Producer(s) | Length |
|---|---|---|---|
| 15. | "G-Stro" | The Neptunes | 3:42 |
| Total length: | | | 1:02:48 |

Bonus DVD
| No. | Title | Length |
|---|---|---|
| 1. | "A Day in the Life of Busta Rhymes" |
| 2. | "The Days of Our Rhymes" |
| 3. | "News Flash" |
| 4. | "Busted!" |
| 5. | "The Many Styles of Busta Rhymes" |
| 6. | "Ruffneck Soulja trailer" |
| 7. | "Music video: Hustler's Anthem 09" |
| 8. | "Music video: Arab Money Remix" |
| 9. | "Music video: Arab Money live at the Knitting Factory" |

Leftover tacks

- "Don't Touch Me (Throw da Water on 'Em)"
- "We Made It" (featuring Linkin Park)

== Charts ==
=== Weekly charts ===
| Chart (2009) | Peak position |
|---|---|
| Austrian Albums (Ö3 Austria) | 66 |
| Belgian Albums (Ultratop Wallonia) | 88 |
| Canadian Albums (Billboard) | 18 |
| French Albums (SNEP) | 20 |
| German Albums (Offizielle Top 100) | 94 |
| Swiss Albums (Schweizer Hitparade) | 15 |
| UK Albums (Official Charts) | 92 |
| UK R&B Albums (Official Charts) | 12 |
| US Billboard 200 | 5 |
| US Top R&B/Hip-Hop Albums (Billboard) | 2 |

== Release history ==
| Region | Date |
|---|---|
| United Kingdom | May 18, 2009 |
| United States | May 19, 2009 |
