= 54th Platoon =

American rapper

- Origin: New Orleans, Louisiana, U.S.
- Genres: Hip hop
- Years active: 1999–2003
- Label: FUBU
- Members: JS; TL; Big Nut; Nu Black

The 54th Platoon are an American rap group who were the only artists signed to the short-lived FUBU Records. The group consisted of four members; JS, TL, Big Nut and Nu Black, all of whom came from New Orleans. They first released two independent albums in 1999 and 2000 entitled From Then... Till Now and Downtown Symphony (Now...Till Forever), before joining FUBU in 2001. The group appeared on FUBU's compilation album, The Good Life, collaborating with Nas and Nate Dogg on the track "Good Life". A year later, they would release their debut album All or Nothin'. It made three Billboard charts, including 21 on the Top R&B/Hip-Hop Albums chart, but it was not a commercial success. In 2003, FUBU Records closed down and the group disbanded.

== Discography ==
Year	Title	Chart positions			
Year	Title	U.S.	U.S. R&B	U.S. Heat	U.S. Ind.
2002	All or Nothin': Released: September 24, 2002; Label: FUBU	128	21	2	6
