= A+ (rapper) =

American rapper (born 1981)

- Also known as: A+; Young Plus
- Born: Andre Levins; August 29, 1981 (age 44)
- Origin: Hempstead, New York, U.S.
- Genres: Hip hop
- Instruments: Vocals
- Years active: 1995–present
- Labels: Kedar Entertainment; UMVD Labels; Masta Mix Records; Assdroknot Entertainment; FochFam; Moneyline Records
- Website: myspace.com/youngplus

Andre Levins, also known as A+ (born August 29, 1981 ) is an American rapper. As a teenager he released albums in 1996 and in 1999.

== History ==
A+ began his music career in 1995, after winning a national talent competition sponsored by Def Jam Records. He was the first act signed to Kedar Massenburg's record label, Kedar Entertainment. According to Massenburg, the A+ moniker "means that he's striving for perfection, and he's not really talking about the same things as other young rappers." In 1996, at the age of 14, A+ released his first album, The Latch-Key Child, which featured contributions from Prodigy and Q-Tip. "All I See" was chosen as the lead single, and it peaked at number 66 on the Billboard Hot 100 chart, staying for 14 weeks.

His second album, Hempstead High, was released in February 1999. Guest appearances on the album included DeBarge, the Lost Boyz and Canibus. The single "Enjoy Yourself", which sampled the 1976 Walter Murphy song "A Fifth of Beethoven", reached the top five of the UK Singles Chart, number 63 of the US Hot 100 for three weeks,) and was also commercially successful in Germany and Japan.

== Discography ==
=== Albums ===
Year	Album	Peak chart positions	
Year	Album	US R&B/HH	US Heat.
1996	The Latch-Key Child	36	17
1999	Hempstead High	60	19

=== Singles ===
Year	Title	Peak chart positions					Album
Year	Title	US	US R&B/HH	AUS	NL	UK	Album
1996	"All I See"	66	29	—	—	—	The Latch-Key Child
1998	"Enjoy Yourself"	63	50	26	4	5	Hempstead High
1999	"Bet She Don't Love You"	—	—	—	88	—	Non-album single
