= Manzel (band) =

American instrumental funk band

- Origin: Lexington, Kentucky, U.S.
- Genres: Instrumental funk
- Years active: 1973–1978
- Label: Fraternity Records
- Past members: Manzel Bush; John Larry Van Dyke; Steve Garner

Manzel was an American instrumental funk band from Lexington, Kentucky, which formed in 1973 and disbanded in 1978. They consisted of Manzel Bush (keyboards), John Larry Van Dyke (guitar) and Steve Garner (drums). In 1976, they recorded some sessions at Counterpart Creative Studios in Cincinnati, Ohio, which resulted in the songs "Space Funk", "Jump Street", "Midnight Theme" and "Sugar Dreams". The first two were released in 1977, and the latter two were released in 1979. While very obscure, Manzel have been widely sampled by hip hop musicians, including J Dilla, De La Soul, Cypress Hill, Ghostface Killah, Eric B. & Rakim and Ultramagnetic MCs. "Space Funk" was also sampled by Grandmaster Flash in the late 1970s.

== Discography ==
=== Singles ===
- 1977 – "Space Funk"/"Jump Street"
- 1979 – "Sugar Dreams"/"Midnight Theme"
- 2017 – "High and Tight"/"Standing on Mars"
