= Wreckx-n-Effect =

American hip-hop group

- Also known as: Wrecks-n-Effect
- Origin: Harlem, New York City, U.S.
- Genres: Hip-hop; new jack swing
- Years active: 1988–1996; 2014–present
- Labels: Atlantic; Motown; MCA
- Members: Aqil Davidson; Markell Riley; Teddy Riley
- Past members: Brandon "B-Doggs" Mitchell (1987–1990; his death); Keith "K.C." Hanns – (1988 concept)

Wreckx-n-Effect (originally Wrecks-n-Effect) is an American hip-hop group from Harlem, New York City. They are best known for their 1992 single "Rump Shaker", which peaked at number two on the Billboard Hot 100.

== History ==
Wrecks-n-Effect was formed in 1987 by childhood friends Aqil Davidson, Markell Riley, and Brandon "B-Doggs" Mitchell. While the group was recording their demo tape, Keith "K.C." Hanns joined on a trial basis as a fourth member. In 1988, the group released their self-titled EP through Atlantic Records. After the release received little recognition, Davidson, Riley, and Mitchell decided to continue as a trio.

In 1989, the group signed with Motown Records and achieved their first number-one single on the Billboard Hot Rap Songs chart with "New Jack Swing." Their 1989 new jack swing-styled album, Wrecks-N-Effect, which featured "New Jack Swing," reached number 16 on the Billboard Hot R&B/Hip-Hop charts and number 103 on the Billboard 200.

On August 8, 1990, Mitchell was fatally shot in Manhattan following an argument over a woman. After his death, the group changed the spelling of their name to Wreckx-n-Effect with an x.

In 1991, Teddy Riley, brother of Markell Riley, founded Future Recording Studios in Virginia Beach, Virginia. One of the first records produced at the studio was Wreckx-n-Effect's 1992 single "Rump Shaker," which peaked at number two on the Billboard Hot 100 and the Billboard Hot R&B/Hip-Hop charts, and also charted internationally. The song's lyrical content sparked controversy, with the New York Daily News describing the group as "horny little rap kids." MTV also refused to air the song's music video unless the group submitted a censored version because it featured women in bikinis shaking their buttocks. The group's second album, Hard or Smooth, which included "Rump Shaker", was released later that year. It reached the top ten and was certified platinum.

The group returned in 1996 with their third and final album, Raps New Generation, which did not achieve the same commercial success as its predecessor. According to Davidson, the album "was really a Posse Deep album. Posse Deep is the street crew we grew up in back in our projects. That album was shaped around that energy and those who were aspiring artists in that number." Shortly after its release, the group disbanded because of internal disagreements.

Conrad Tillard, also known as the "Hip Hop Minister", arranged a truce between Wreckx-n-Effect and A Tribe Called Quest following a feud between the two groups. Tillard had previously said that the dispute threatened to turn Harlem into a "war zone."

In 2004, "New Jack Swing" was included on the soundtrack to Grand Theft Auto: San Andreas.

== Discography ==
=== Albums ===
Title	Details	Peak chart positions			Certifications
Title	Details	US	US R&B	AUS	Certifications
Wrecks-n-Effect	Release date: September 1, 1989; Label: Motown	103	16	—	
Hard or Smooth	Release date: November 24, 1992; Label: MCA	9	6	91	RIAA: Platinum
Raps New Generation	Release date: September 24, 1996; Label: MCA	—	—	—	
"—" denotes releases that did not chart

=== Singles ===
Year	Single	Certifications	Peak chart positions								Album
Year	Single	Certifications	US Hot 100	US R&B	US Rap	US Dance	AUS	NZ	NED	UK	Album
1989	"New Jack Swing"		—	14	1	48	—	49	—	82	Wrecks-n-Effect
1989	"Juicy"		—	36	6	—	—	—	—	29	Wrecks-n-Effect
1990	"Club Head / Rock 1 Steady".		—	—	20	—	—	—	—	—	Wrecks-n-Effect
1992	"Rump Shaker"	*RIAA: Multi-Platinum	2	2	1	9	10	11	70	24	Hard or Smooth
1993	"Wreckx Shop"		101	46	11	—	81	40	—	26	Hard or Smooth
1993	"Knock-N-Boots"		72	71	—	—	—	28	—	—	Hard or Smooth
1993	"My Cutie"		—	75	—	—	85	—	—	—	Hard or Smooth
1996	"Top Billin'"		—	—	38	—	—	—	—	—	Raps New Generation
"—" denotes releases that did not chart or were not released.
