= Aqil Davidson =

American lyricist (born 1972)

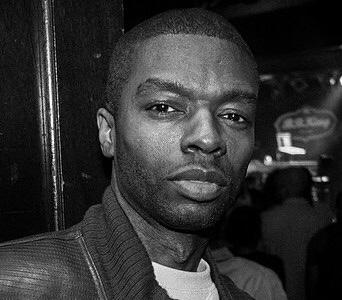
- Davidson in 2014

Background information
- Also known as: A-Plus, Empra
- Born: Aqil Davidson; 1 August 1972 (age 54); Harlem, New York City, U.S.
- Genres: Hip-hop, new jack swing
- Occupations: Lyricist; songwriter; record producer
- Years active: 1987–present
- Member of: Wreckx-n-Effect

Aqil Davidson (Born August 1, 1972), also known as A-Plus, is an American rapper, lyricist, songwriter and producer who is a founding member and lead vocalist for the new jack swing group Wreckx-n-Effect. He has also been credited with songwriting or production work on albums by Michael Jackson, Bobby Brown, MC Hammer, MC Lyte, and Guy, as well as maintaining a solo career.

== Career ==
Davidson formed Wreckx-n-Effect with Riley and Mitchell in 1988. He released three albums with the group: the self-titled Wreckx-n-Effect in 1989, with the breakout #1 rap chart hit "New Jack Swing", Then the RIAA certified platinum "Hard or Smooth" in 1992, containing the multi-platinum smash Rump Shaker and Raps New Generation in 1996. Wreckx is most known for the singles “New Jack Swing” and “Rump Shaker” which hit the No. 2 position on Billboard 100 in January 1993. Both of the singles reached the #1 ranking on Billboard's Hot Rap Songs chart.

Davidson served as a producer, composer, and featured artist for new jack swing group Guy’s album The Future, which was released in 1990. Davidson worked closely with Guy member Teddy Riley on his projects with Wreckx-n-Effect. In 93'He also made a guess appearance on song called Make U Wet which was on BLACKstreet's 1st Album.

In 2019, Davidson released a remix of “Rump Shaker” alongside Wreckx-n-Effects bandmate Markell Riley to promote liqueur brand Rumple Minze.

== Personal life ==
In 2020, Davidson was part of a group of celebrities who signed a publicly released letter urging the state of New York to repeal section 50-A of New York's Civil Rights Law in the wake of the murder of George Floyd.

== Discography ==
=== As featured artist ===
Year	Single	Album
1989	“New Jack Swing” (Wreckx-N-Effect feat. Aqil Davidson & Teddy Riley)	Wreckx-N-Effect
1990	“So You Like What You See” remix (Samuelle feat. Aqil Davidson)	Living in Black Paradise
1990	“D-O-G Me Out" remix (GUY feat. Aqil Davidson)	The Future
1991	“She Drives Me Wild” (Michael Jackson feat. Aqil Davidson)	Dangerous
1991	"Ready Or Not" (Wreckx-N-Effect feat. Aqil Davidson & BigBub)	House Party 2 sdtrk
1992	“Is It Good To You” remix (Tammy Lucas feat. Aqil Davidson)	JUICE
1992	“That's The Way Love Is” (Bobby Brown feat. Aqil Davidson)	Bobby"
1992	“Rump Shaker” (Wreckx-N-Effect feat. Aqil Davidson)	Hard or Smooth
1992	“Wreckx Shop” (Wreckx-N-Effect feat. Aqil Davidson)	Hard or Smooth
1993	“Knockin Boots" (Wreckx-N-Effect feat. Aqil Davidson)	Hard or Smooth”
1994	“Joi” (London Jones feat. Aqil Davidson)	For You
1997	“I Believe” (Remix feat. Aqil Davidson and Nutta Butta)	Shades

=== As a songwriter ===
Year	Artist	Album	Song	Peak chart positions		
Year	Artist	Album	Song	US	US R&B HipHop	Hot Rap Songs
1990	Guy	The Future	"Her"	—	—	—
1990	Guy	The Future	“Wanna Get With U”	—	—	—
1990	Guy	The Future	“Total Control”	—	—	—
1990	Guy	The Future	“Gotta Be a Leader”	—	—	—
1990	Michael Jackson	Dangerous	“She Drives Me Wild”	—	—	—
1992	Bobby Brown	Bobby	“That’s the Way Love Is”	57	9	—
1993	MC Lyte	Ain’t No Other	“Ruffneck”	35	10	1
1994	London Jones	For You	"Joi"	—	—	—
1997	No Authority	Keep On	“Don’t Stop”	—	—	—
1997	Queen Pen	My Melody	“Party Ain’t a Party”	—	—	—
1997	Shades	Shades	“I Believe” (Remix feat. Aqil Davidson and Nutta Butta)	—	—	—
"—" denotes releases that did not chart
