= List of My Super Sweet 16 episodes =

The following is a list of My Super Sweet 16 episodes:

== Series overview ==
Season	Episodes	Originally released	
Season	Episodes	First released	Last released
1	6	January 18, 2005	February 22, 2005
2	9	August 15, 2005	October 10, 2005
3	11	April 12, 2006	July 25, 2006
4	13	January 8, 2007	April 9, 2007
5	14	June 18, 2007	September 25, 2007
6	10	November 12, 2007	June 15, 2008
7	8	2008	2008
8	6	2008	2015
9	8	October 20, 2016	February 21, 2017
10	10	May 14, 2017	September 11, 2017

== Episodes ==
=== Season 1 (2005) ===
No. overall	No. in season	Title	Location	Party Theme	Special Gift	Original release date
1	1	"Jacqueline and Lauren"	La Jolla, California	None	None	January 18, 2005
Unwritten Law performs. Jacqueline and Lauren have guests donate money toward breast cancer research.
2	2	"Jacque"	Albuquerque, New Mexico	Masquerade/Mardi Gras	Ford Mustang	January 25, 2005
Uninvited guests streak through the party.
3	3	"Ava"	Beverly Hills, California	Arabian Night	Land Rover Range Rover	February 1, 2005
Kamran and Hooman perform. Ava wears a dress intended to imitate a designer's revealing garment.
4	4	"Hart"	Pennsylvania	None	None	February 8, 2005
DJ Samantha Ronson performs. Hart takes girls to his mother's boutique to bribe them into attending his party.
5	5	"Natalie"	La Jolla, California	Hollywood	None	February 15, 2005
Natalie has two friends fly in for the party as she was born and raised in Roswell, New Mexico before moving to La Jolla as a teenager. She's now married to Henry Cavill.
6	6	"Sierra"	Atlanta, Georgia	Celebrity	Diamond Encrusted Tiara	February 22, 2005
The party is almost called off due to a poor report card. Sierra makes her entrance walking into the party's fashion show. Sierra was the stepdaughter of musician Cee Lo Green at the time of this episode.

=== Season 2 (2005) ===
No. overall	No. in season	Title	Location	Party Theme	Special Gift	Original release date
7	1	"Sophie"	West Palm Beach, Florida	Moulin Rouge	Audi A4	August 15, 2005
Sophie makes a grand entrance surrounded by can-can dancers.
8	2	"The Bettencourt Triplets"	Fremont, California	Las Vegas	Dad surprises triplets with a special performer	August 22, 2005
Each girl has a small performance during the party, then Sugarcult is revealed for a surprise show.
9	3	"Amanda"	Ocala, Florida	Hawaiian	Breast Enhancement Surgery	August 29, 2005
Ciara performs. The members of a jazz ensemble at Amanda's school perform "Happy Birthday" in an attempt to win an invitation to her party.
10	4	"Lila"	San Diego, California	Celebrities	Net gun	September 5, 2005
Lila uses silver medallions made in Mexico as invitations.
11	5	"Jazmin"	Erie, Pennsylvania	Beach Party	Used BMW Z3	September 12, 2005
Jazmin's first birthday party since being adopted at 14 years old.
12	6	"Bjorn"	Avon, Connecticut	Fashionista	BMW 5-Series	September 19, 2005
Bjorn enters the party in a fashion show and later throws up during the party.
13	7	"Cindy"	Staten Island, New York	Cinderella	None	September 26, 2005
Cindy arrives in a carriage styled like Cinderella's and later dances a la Dirty Dancing.
14	8	"Janelle"	Miami, Florida	Quinceañera Princess	None	October 3, 2005
Janelle wears a dress specially designed like one in Princess Diaries 2.
15	9	"Carlysia"	Atlanta, Georgia	None	Used Mercedes-Benz C-Class Coupe	October 10, 2005
With the famous R&B singer Gerald Levert as her father, Carlysia Levert gets what she wants. She hand delivers CDs as invitations, and later performs her own song at the party.

=== Season 3 (2006) ===
No. overall	No. in season	Title	Location	Party Theme	Special Gift	Original release date
16	1	"Marissa"	Scottsdale, Arizona	Pretty in Pink	Mitsubishi Eclipse and Mitsubishi Endeavor	April 12, 2006
Frankie J performs. Marissa has two dogs dyed pink to match the party's theme.
17	2	"Aaron"	New York, New York	Young & Hott	None	April 12, 2006
Aaron passes out MP3 players with his own voice recorded as invitations and invites his godfather, Diddy, and later, Aaron's father surprises him with Kanye West, who he thought would not be able to perform.
18	3	"Alexa"	Miami, Florida	Arabian Theme	Lexus SC430 & Rolex watch	April 19, 2006
Before the party, Alexa has an argument with her mother about centerpieces and breaks up with her boyfriend. At the party she dances a self-choreographed belly dance.
19	4	"Chelsi"	Litchfield, New Hampshire	Ancient Rome	Mercedes-Benz SLK	April 26, 2006
An unruly party guest knocks over cake before Chelsi gets to see it.
20	5	"Meleny"	Long Island, New York	Egyptian	BMW 7-Series	May 3, 2006
Lucas Prata performs. Meleny makes grand entrance with snake around her arm, a la Britney Spears.
21	6	"Alex"	Birmingham, Michigan	Winter Wonderland	BMW X5	May 10, 2006
Luther Lackey performs. Alex arrives in style in a horse-drawn carriage.
22	7	"Darnell"	Harlem, New York	Coming to America	Mercedes-Benz S550	May 17, 2006
Juelz Santana and J. Isaac perform. Darnell arrives atop a camel with Rihanna.
23	8	"Nicole"	San Francisco, California	J'adore Nicole	BMW 3-Series	June 27, 2006
Keak da Sneak and Cirque du Soleil perform.
24	9	"Rachel and Kelsey"	Memphis, Tennessee	"Sixteen in the City" (play on Sex and the City)	None	July 11, 2006
D4L and Three 6 Mafia perform. Rachel and Kelsey have guests donate money for St. Jude's Hospital.
25	10	"Priya and Divya"	Beaumont, Texas	Indian Royalty	Diamond Encrusted Tiaras	July 18, 2006
The Format performs. Priya and Divya perform a traditional Indian dance in their combined sweet 16 and graduation party.
26	11	"Erica"	Atlanta, Georgia	Midsummer Night's Dream	BMW X5	July 25, 2006
Bobby V performs. Erica Price performs a choreographed hip-hop routine.

=== Season 4 (2007) ===
No. overall	No. in season	Title	Location	Party Theme	Special Gift	Original release date
27	1	"Allison"	Atlanta, Georgia	All Around the World	ML350, G-Unit performance	January 8, 2007
Lloyd Banks, Young Buck, and Jermaine Dupri perform. Led by a marching band, Allison arrives in style in a Bentley.
28	2	"Cher"	Palm Harbor, Florida	Mardi Gras	Jaguar XK	January 15, 2007
After arriving on a float and magically appearing in a box, Cher performs a hip-hop routine.
29	3	"Stephanie"	Miami, Florida	Venetian Masquerade	Six weeks to study abroad in France	January 22, 2007
Little people entertain party guests. Stephanie dresses her court in Venetian-style gowns, tuxedos, and masks.
30	4	"Amberly"	Virginia Beach, Virginia	Pink Ice	Audi A4 (revealed in the "remix" episode)	January 29, 2007
Tyler Hilton performs. Amberly distributes her signature perfume as party favors.
31	5	"Erin"	Los Angeles, California	An All-White Bash	Porsche Cayenne	February 5, 2007
Erin is daughter of late rapper Eazy-E. Because the venue is a mansion in a quiet neighborhood, the party is later shut down.
32	6	"Ariel"	Campbellsville, Kentucky	Fairy tale	BMW 3-Series	February 12, 2007
Ariel arrives in a horse-drawn carriage.
33	7	"Katie"	Memphis, Tennessee	Christmas in Memphis	Hummer H2 & Jacob's watch.	February 19, 2007
Yung Joc performs. Katie struggles to find an actual sleigh to ride in despite the lack of snow.
34	8	"Teyana Taylor"	Harlem, New York	1980s	BMX Bicycle & Land Rover Range Rover	February 26, 2007
The Last Winter performs. Teyana performs a hip-hop routine. She originally planned for a skate ramp to be built inside the venue, but it was called off for insurance reasons. Two Previous Sweet 16ers appear: Darnell at the dance studio, and Aaron at the party itself.
35	9	"Nikki"	Miramar, Florida	Coney Island	Lexus IS	March 5, 2007
Pitbull performs. Nikki is the first of a rivalry to throw her party.
36	10	"Priscilla"	Davie, Florida	Polynesian Luau	Mercedes-Benz SL 500	March 12, 2007
Fat Joe performs. Priscilla is concerned that her rival had stolen her party ideas, but soon thinks otherwise.
37	11	"Svetlana"	Miami, Florida	None	None	March 19, 2007
Svetlana has Rocawear model their Spring 2007 collection. The cross-country event begins with one night in Las Vegas and a second night in Miami, Florida.
38	12	"Rachel"	Charlotte, North Carolina	Winter Wonderland	Lexus IS250	April 2, 2007
Rachel's father hires ballet dancers, much to her dismay. She places $1,000 inside a Money Booth for attendees to win.
39	13	"Destinee"	Atlanta, Georgia	Welcome Hollywood	Range Rover	April 9, 2007
Sammie performs. Destinee performs a hip-hop routine. She is jokingly gifted a minivan before her true gift was revealed. Destinee's father is former NFL star Ray Buchanan.

=== Season 5 (2007) ===
No. overall	No. in season	Title	Location	Party Theme	Special Gift	Original release date
40	1	"Audrey"	Miami, Florida	Haute Couture	Lexus	June 18, 2007
This is Audrey's quinceañera, not her sweet 16. After receiving her car on her actual birthday, rather than at the party, she threw a temper tantrum, and threatened to cancel the party.
41	2	"Mary"	Hattiesburg, Mississippi	Las Vegas	$150,000 horse	June 25, 2007
Ryan Cabrera performs. Mary arrives in style in a pink Cadillac.
42	3	"Colin"	Cleveland, Ohio	Crown Prince	BMW 5 Series and used Land Rover Range Rover	July 2, 2007
Mike Jones and Machine Gun Kelly perform. Colin holds a comedy contest in which the funniest competitors receive the extra invitations to his party.
43	4	"Chris Brown"	New York, New York	Michael Jackson's Off the Wall	Customized Lamborghini	July 9, 2007
Li'l Mama performs. Originally from Tappahannock, Virginia, Chris Brown hosts two events in one night in New York City: one for fans and one for celebrities. He makes his grand entrance with a step team and drum corps.
44	5	"Alyson"	Little Rock, Arkansas	Military	Volkswagen Eos	July 17, 2007
Dre & Jontai (Family Made) perform. Alyson gives out dog tags as invitations and arrives in style in a Hummer. The party is almost shut down because of a faux volcano filling the venue with smoke.
45	6	"Malia"	Atlanta, Georgia	The World is Mine	Mercedes-Benz SLK 350	July 24, 2007
Performers: Big Boi (OutKast); Notes:
46	7	"DJ"	Berkeley, California	Black Diamond Affair	Mercedes-Benz GL450	July 30, 2007
The Pack performs. DJ distributes invitations with his stepfather (Danny Clark) and his football colleagues.
47	8	"Alexandria"	Sacramento, California	Heaven Only Knows	Cadillac CTS	August 6, 2007
Clyde Carson performs.
48	9	"Savannah"	Orange County, California	Jungle	BMW 3 Series Convertible	August 13, 2007
Savannah's party features exotic animals.
49	10	"Stefanie"	New York City, New York	Party Like A Rockstar	The party itself and private show by famous band	August 20, 2007
Stefanie is the winner of MTV's "Next Super Sweet 16er" contest. My Chemical Romance performs.
50	11	"Bre"	Los Angeles, California	None	2008 Range Rover Sport HSE	August 27, 2007
Bre sings her own song, Hurricane Chris performs. Erin from season 4 attends the party.
51	12	"Aly & AJ"	Los Angeles, California	Star-Studded Le Deux Party	2008 Mercedes-Benz E350 for AJ; 2008 BMW 5 Series for Aly	September 3, 2007
Plain White T's perform.
52	13	"Maestro"	Chicago, Illinois	Lucky Strike Bowling	None	September 25, 2007
53	14	"Makahla"	Columbus, Ohio	Western Glam	Hummer H3	September 25, 2007
Season finale.

=== Season 6 (2007–08) ===
No. overall	No. in season	Title	Location	Party Theme	Special Gift	Original release date
54	1	"Bobby"	Chicago, Illinois	Hollywood	TBA	November 12, 2007
55	2	"Kat"	Palm Springs, California	Caribbean	TBA	November 19, 2007
56	3	"Alex"	Boston, Massachusetts	Seven Deadly Sins	TBA	November 26, 2007
57	4	"Geri"	Phoenix, Arizona	Rocky Horror	TBA	December 3, 2007
58	5	"Alicia"	Montreal, Quebec, Canada	Moulin Rouge	TBA	January 1, 2008
59	6	"Chanae"	Cleveland, Ohio	Rock and Roll	TBA	January 1, 2008
60	7	"Lacey"	Ashland, Ohio	Lacey Land	TBA	January 28, 2008
61	8	"Yashika"	Franklin Lakes, New Jersey	Diamonds are Forever	Mercedes S550	January 28, 2008
62	9	"Shanell"	Englewood, New Jersey	Oscar Afterparty	TBA	May 19, 2008
63	10	"Etienne"	Los Angeles, California	James Bond	Ford Mustang	June 15, 2008

=== Season 7 (2008) ===
No. overall	No. in season	Title	Location	Party Theme	Special Gift	Original release date
64	1	"Quincy"	Atlanta, Georgia	Stunna Sixteen	pimped-out Range Rover and a classic white Cadillac convertible.	May 19, 2008
Quincy Brown, a native of Atlanta, but currently residing in California, is the son of Kim Porter and Al B. Sure. He decides to throw a "Stunna Sixteen" themed party, which includes the musical acts Fabo, Gorilla Zoe, Crime Mob, Hurricane Chris, and a special surprise performance by Bow Wow and Omarion. Diddy surprises Quincy with a pimped-out Range Rover and a classic white Cadillac convertible.
65	2	"Sky"	Atlanta, Georgia	Royal Rap Princess of the Moulin Rouge	TBA	July 29, 2008
Atlanta diva Sky is about to show the world the real Moulin Rouge with her eccentric sixteenth birthday party.
66	3	"Sean Kingston"	Jamaica	Jamaican Super 18	expected Bentley	August 6, 2008
Sean Kingston is celebrating his 18th birthday in style back in Jamaica. Epic Records presents Sean with a plaque of seven million units sold, and since his mom couldn't make it to the party, she sent him a special video message saying that when he gets home the Bentley he had his eye on will be waiting for him.
67	4	"Margaret Ann"	Charleston, South Carolina	Carnival of Delights	her dream car, a Hummer, and a matching jet-ski	August 6, 2008
Margaret Ann is the ultimate girly girl who competes in pageants and wants all eyes on her. Cobra Starship surprises her guests and performs at the party. Margaret Ann's parents lead her outside and surprise her with her dream car, a Hummer, and a matching jet-ski.
68	5	"Bow Wow"	Washington, D.C. Las Vegas, Nevada	Super Stuntin' 21	Mercedes Maybach	August 6, 2008
Bow Wow wants to throw not one, but two parties for his 21st birthday. He first hosts a party in Washington, D.C. and then after, jets off to Las Vegas to his party at Jet Night Club. When he arrives in Las Vegas, his mother surprises him with his very own Mercedes Maybach. Snoop Dogg makes a surprise appearance and performs at the party.
69	6	"Haley"	Houston, Texas	Dirty South	TBA	August 6, 2008
Haley is an All-American sweetheart who loves sports, shopping, and hip hop. Haley choose to host her party at Beyoncé's club, House of Dereon Media Center. Paul Wall performs and then surprises Haley with a custom made iced-out grill.
70	7	"Taylor"	Columbus, Ohio	Viva Las Vegas	Mercedes	2008
She may live in Ohio, but beauty-queen Taylor plans to celebrate her sixteenth birthday Vegas-style.

=== Season 8 (2008) ===
No. overall	No. in season	Title	Location	Party Theme	Special Gift	Original release date
71	1	"Demetrius"	Miami, FL	Saint Tropez 16	TBA	2008
Demetrius throws a party worthy of his dad Timbaland by bringing the glamour of Saint Tropez to Miami.
72	2	"Christy"	TBA	'80s Roller Party	TBA	2008
DJ Spinderella's daughter throws a super '80s roller bash, where she makes her own DJ debut.
73	3	"Soulja Boy Tell'em"	TBA	Super Swag 18	TBA	2008
74	4	"Justin"	New York City	My Super Royal 16	Maybach car and his own driver.	2010
It was now the turn of Justin Combs another son of Diddy to turn sixteen, he decided to throw a "Super Royal 16", his father decided to make Nicki Minaj his birthday date and she performed for him included Fabolous and Trey Songz, his father then surprised him with a Maybach car and his own driver.
75	5	"Kimberly"	Chicago, Illinois	Prom	Ferrari, Silver necklace with a broken heart pendant, Pink teddy bear	2011
The Click Five performs. Kim writes a letter to Kyle Patrick & his band to sing for the party.
76	6	"Reginae Carter"	Atlanta, Georgia	TBA	Ferrari and BMW	February 2015
Lil Wayne's daughter. Nicki Minaj appears.

=== Season 9 (2009–11) ===
No. overall	No. in season	Title	Location	Party Theme	Special Gift	Original release date
77	1	"Lea"	TBA	Horror	TBA	October 20, 2009
78	2	"Anana"	TBA	Japanese	TBA	October 21, 2009
79	3	"Crystal"	TBA	New york fashion week	TBA	October 23, 2009
80	4	"Alana"	TBA	Tinkerbell	TBA	October 23, 2009
81	5	"Cristina"	Meriden, Connecticut	New York Fashion Week	BMW 3 Series	October 23, 2009
82	6	"Nikki"	TBA	Las vegas	TBA	October 23, 2009
83	7	"Justin Combs"	TBA	TBA	TBA	February 21, 2010
84	8	"Aaron Reid - Rockstar 21"	TBA	TBA	TBA	February 21, 2011

=== Season 10 (2017) ===
No. overall	No. in season	Title	Location	Party Theme	Special Gift	Original release date
85	1	"Dy'mond"	TBA	Diamonds	BMW	May 14, 2017
Dy'mond is a YouTube sensation, a dancer, and a Daddy's girl who is used to getting everything she wants, but executing the perfect sweet 16 proves to be more challenging than expected.
86	2	"Center Stage Sweet 16"	Avalon Theatre	Classic Hollywood	Fender Guitar	May 21, 2017
Child actor Noah Urrea is planning to shed his boyhood image for a new mature look and sound. The stakes are high as he launches his pop music career at his own classic Hollywood themed sweet 16 party.
87	3	"Debutante Baller"	Hotel Del Coronado	Debut	TBA	June 12, 2017
A young woman plans a debut for her 18th birthday, where the spotlight will be on her, not her over-the-top mother.
88	4	"Quinceanera in Wonderland"	Eagle Lake Convention Center	Alice in Wonderland	TBA	June 19, 2017
A girl worries that her Alice and Wonderland-themed party will become a nightmare.
89	5	"Golden Key Bromitzvah"	The Hideaway	Gold	BMW	June 26, 2017
A rapper (Lil Key) celebrates his seventeenth birthday with a Bro-Mitzvah, and is ready to take the world by storm with his single (produced by MB Salone). His party was almost shut down by police as the crowd went wild.
90	6	"Our Super Musical.ly Sweet 16"	2424 Studios	Hip Hop	Lamborghini	July 3, 2017
Sisters and Musical.ly stars, SiAngie Twins, are turning 16, and their over-the-top parents and boxing champion brother are throwing a party.
91	7	"Itali's California Dream"	TBA	TBA	TBA	September 4, 2017
92	8	"Behind the Masquerade"	TBA	TBA	TBA	September 4, 2017
93	9	"Birthday and the Beatz"	TBA	TBA	TBA	September 11, 2017
94	10	"A Super Magical Sweet 16"	TBA	TBA	TBA	September 11, 2017
