= Acapella (Mikolas Josef song) =

Single by Mikolas Josef featuring Fito Blanko and Frankie J
- Released: 24 May 2019
- Recorded: 2019
- Genre: Pop
- Length: 2:58
- Label: Vivienne
- Songwriter(s): Jenson Vaughan; Francisco Bautista; Sarah Raba; Christophe Vitorino De Almeida; Walid Benmerieme; Mikoláš Josef Čapoun; Roberto Testa

Mikolas Josef singles chronology
"Abu Dhabi" (2019)	"Acapella" (2019)	"Colorado" (2019)

Fito Blanko singles chronology
"Yes" (2019)	"Acapella" (2019)

Frankie J singles chronology
"El Sueno" (2018)	"Acapella" (2019)

"Acapella" is a song by Czech singer Mikolas Josef featuring vocals from Panamanian-Canadian Tropical Urban singer-songwriter Fito Blanko and Mexican-American singer, songwriter and rapper Frankie J. It was released as a Digital download on 24 May 2019 by Vivienne Records. The song was written by Jenson Vaughan, Francisco Bautista, Sarah Raba, Christophe Vitorino De Almeida, Walid Benmerieme, Mikoláš Josef and Roberto Testa.

== Background ==
In April 2019, Josef performed his first solo concert called 'My Name Is Mikolas Josef' in Prague. He performed his songs "Lie to Me", "Abu Dhabi", and "Me Gusta". He also performed new tracks, with one of them being "Acapella". After the show, people who were at the concert could decide their favorite new song to select as Mikolas Josef's new single.

== Music video ==
A music video to accompany the release of "Acapella" was first released onto YouTube on 23 May 2019 at a total length of three minutes and twenty-five seconds. Josef directed, scripted, edited and operated the drone for the video.

== Track listing ==
Digital download
No.	Title	Length
1.	"Acapella" (feat. Fito Blanko & Frankie J)	2:58

Digital download
No.	Title	Length
1.	"Acapella" (Acoustic)	2:42

== Charts ==
=== Weekly charts ===
Chart (2019)	Peak position
Belgium (Ultratip Bubbling Under Wallonia)	38
Czech Republic (Rádio – Top 100)	1
Czech Republic (Singles Digitál Top 100)	20
Poland (Polish Airplay Top 100)	2
Slovakia (Rádio Top 100)	54

=== Year-end charts ===
Chart (2019)	Position
Poland (ZPAV)	37

== Certifications ==
Region	Certification	Certified units/sales
Poland (ZPAV)	Gold	10,000^{‡}
^{‡} Sales+streaming figures based on certification alone.

== Release history ==
Region	Date	Format	Label
Czech Republic	24 May 2019	Digital download; streaming	Vivienne Records
