= Frankie J (album) =

Studio album by Frankie J
- Released: July 30, 2003
- Recorded: 2002–2003
- Genre: Latin pop; R&B
- Length: 50:26
- Label: Columbia
- Producer: Frankie J, Charles Chávez, Kiko Cibrian, Jorge Espino, James Gálvez

Frankie J chronology
What's a Man to Do (2003)	Frankie J (2003)	The One (2005)

Singles from Frankie J
- 1. "Ya No Es Igual" Released: 2003

Frankie J is the second studio album and first Spanish language album by Frankie J released on July 30, 2003.

== Track listing ==
No.	Title	Length
1.	"Ya No Es Igual"	4:10
2.	"Nunca Cambiare (featuring Gemini)"	4:18
3.	"Interlude"	0:34
4.	"Despues"	3:03
5.	"Me Siento Solo"	4:01
6.	"Ahora Que Estas Aqui (featuring Gemini)"	3:55
7.	"Quiero Saber"	3:56
8.	"Regresare"	4:11
9.	"No Era Para Mi"	4:40
10.	"Tu Amor"	4:47
11.	"No la Culpes a Ella"	4:29
12.	"Ya No Es Igual (Cumbia Version)"	3:35
13.	"Supa Love"	4:47

== Chart position ==
Year	Chart	Peak
2003	Billboard Latin Pop Albums	17
2003	Billboard Top Latin Albums	57
