= Get the Funk Out =

Single by Extreme featuring Pat Travers

from the album Extreme II: Pornograffitti
- Released: 1990
- Genre: Pop metal; funk metal; heavy metal
- Length: 4:24
- Label: A&M
- Songwriters: Nuno Bettencourt; Gary Cherone
- Producer: Michael Wagener

Extreme singles chronology
"Decadence Dance" (1990)	"Get the Funk Out" (1990)	"More Than Words" (1991)

Music video
- "Get the Funk Out" on YouTube

"Get the Funk Out" is a song by American rock band Extreme. It was released as the second single from their second studio album, Extreme II: Pornograffitti (1990). Canadian rock musician Pat Travers provided backing vocals to the song. The official music video for the song was directed by Andy Morahan.

The song's guitar solo, played by Nuno Bettencourt, was praised by Queen's Brian May, who stated: "If that doesn't bring tears to your eyes as a guitarist, I don't know where things are, ... I could never do that, ... That's a landmark in rock history."

== Track listing ==
1. "Get the Funk Out" - 4:24
2. "Li'l Jack Horny" - 4:51
3. "Mutha (Don't Wanna Go To School Today)" (Remix) - 4:52
