= Frankie J =

Mexican-American singer

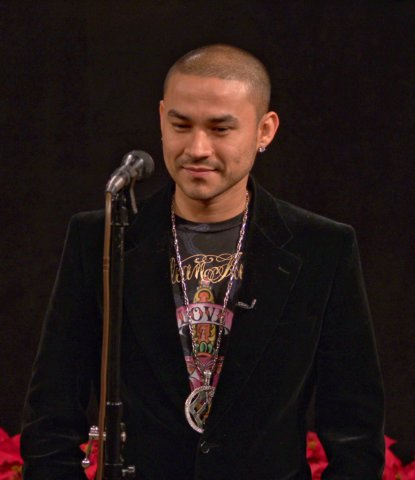
- Frankie J in 2006
- Born: Francisco Javier Bautista Jr. December 7, 1976 (age 49); Tijuana, Baja California, Mexico
- Other names: Frankie Boy; Cisko; Frankie J
- Occupations: Singer; songwriter
- Years active: 1993–present
- Website: therealfrankiej.com

Francisco Javier Bautista Jr. (born December 7, 1976) better known by his stage name Frankie J, is a Mexican-American singer and former member of the musical group Kumbia Kings.

Born in Mexico, Latin America, he is of Native Latino-American descent. He grew up in San Diego and became a freestyle artist under the stage name Frankie Boy in the late 1990s. He then joined Kumbia Kings before re-embarking on a solo career. Frankie J's solo debut album, What's a Man to Do, was released in 2003, followed by more English and Spanish language albums. He received a Grammy Award nomination for his album Faith, Hope y Amor in 2013 for Best Latin Pop Album.

== Early life ==
Bautista was born in Tijuana, Baja California, Mexico, and raised in San Diego, California, United States, from the age of two, after his uncle brought him and his siblings to the United States. He grew up listening to both traditional Latin music as well as American urban music. He attended Southwest Senior High School in San Diego. He later began to develop more interest in singing, with the encouragement of his family. At high school age, he began participating in talent shows and performing at school functions. He graduated high school in 1995.

== Career ==
Bautista's first taste of the music business was in 1993, when he was briefly signed to Canadian independent record label Ventura International Records, featuring on a song called "Margarita" by Turkish artist Atilla. In 1997, Bautista signed with the now-defunct Hola Recordings which at the time had only one artist signed to the label, the brainchild of dance music legend and producer Jellybean Benitez. At the time, he was a freestyle artist known as Frankie Boy and his music was released on three Maximum Freestyle compilations but his solo CD was shelved before release.

=== Kumbia Kings (1999–2003) ===
In 1999, he became a member of the Kumbia Kings (created by A.B. Quintanilla, brother of Selena). He performed under the name Cisko.

=== Solo career: What's a Man to Do ===
Frankie J signed as a solo artist with Columbia Records and released his first album What's a Man to Do on May 27, 2003. His self-titled first Spanish-language album Frankie J was also released later in the same year. The album's lead single "Don't Wanna Try" peaked at #19 on the Billboard Hot 100 Singles Chart, while "Ya No Es Igual" went Top 10 on the World Latin charts. Later that year, he was featured in the Top 10 Billboard Hot 100 hit "Suga Suga" by rapper Baby Bash.

=== The One and breakthrough ===
His second album The One was released on March 22, 2005. It was led by the #3 Billboard Hot 100 hit "Obsession (No Es Amor)" featuring rapper Baby Bash, and followed by the Top 40 singles "How To Deal" and "More Than Words". To coincide with the release of "More Than Words", the album was re-released on the DualDisc format in October. By January 2006, The One was certified platinum by the RIAA for shipping over a million copies. His second Spanish-language album Un Nuevo Dia was released on June 13, 2006, and featured the single "Pensado En Ti".

Frankie's third English-language album, Priceless, was released on October 17, 2006. It debuted at #30 on the Billboard 200. The lead single "That Girl" featured Chamillionaire and Mannie Fresh and peaked at number 43 on the Billboard Hot 100. A second single, "Daddy's Little Girl", charted at number 23 on the Billboard Bubbling Under Hot 100 chart.

=== Independent route ===
Following his departure from Columbia Records, Frankie J released a few singles ("Pictures", "If You Were My Girlfriend", "Crush") between 2008 and 2011, as well as starting his own label, Soulsick Records. He has also written songs for other artists, most recently the number 2 hit song "Take a Chance on Me" in the United Kingdom for boyband JLS.

He released his fourth English-language studio album Courage on December 7, 2011. The lead single "How Beautiful You Are" was released to digital retailers on October 24, 2011. The music video was directed by Mike Ho and premiered on YouTube on September 11, 2011. The video for the album's second single "And I Had You There" premiered on Frankie's YouTube channel on November 26, 2011. Frankie J and Baby Bash shot a video for the album's third single "That's Wussup" in December 2011 in San Diego, California. The video premiered on January 8, 2012.

On July 12, 2012, it was announced that Frankie J will join Jennifer Lopez and Enrique Iglesias on their joint North America tour, serving as a special guest, replacing Wisin & Yandel who were initially the opening act.

=== Faith, Hope y Amor and Grammy success ===
In 2011, he signed with Universal Music and began work on a new Spanish-language album. He released two digital singles ("Ay, Ay, Ay" and "Tienes Que Creer En Mi"/"Take a Chance on Me") in late 2012.

In 2013, he released his new album, Faith, Hope y Amor on May 28, 2013. The album was nominated for the 56th annual Grammy Award under the category of Best Latin Pop Album. It was preceded by the release of the singles "No Te Quiero Ver Con Él" and "Beautiful" (featuring Pitbull). "Impossible" was also released as a single.

On November 26, 2015, he premiered the single "Breakin'", with a music video (in English and Spanglish) premiering on December 14. The digital single was released on December 25, 2015. Four additional singles — "Let the Music Take Control", "I Promise You", "Riches in Heaven", and "Body Rock" — followed in 2016. He announced his next album would be titled More Than the Music. Another single "Not So Dangerous" was released on December 25, 2016.

In March 2017, he scored a radio hit with "Si Una Vez (If I Once)" which was a collaboration with Play-N-Skillz, Wisin, and Leslie Grace. In June, he collaborated with Baby Bash for a new single titled "Vamonos". The following month in July, he released a new single "Lowrider" with Baby Bash, C Kan, Ozomatli & Kid Frost.

On July 27, he released his new studio album titled Eleven through his own label Soulsick Musick Inc.

=== Acting ===
Frankie appeared as a celebrity guest at the 16th birthday party of Marissa Mishelle on MTV's My Super Sweet 16.

In 2011, he joined the mun2 television series RPM Miami as mechanic Ramon. The series was quickly renewed for a second season.

== Discography ==
=== Studio albums ===
Title	Details	Peak chart positions			Certifications
Title	Details	US	US Latin	AUS	Certifications
What's a Man to Do	Released: May 27, 2003; Label: Columbia; Formats: CD, digital download	53	—	—	
Frankie J^{a}	Released: July 30, 2003; Label: Sony Discos; Formats: CD, digital download	—	57	—	
The One	Released: March 22, 2005; Label: Columbia; Formats: CD, digital download	3	—	88	RIAA: Platinum
Un Nuevo Dia^{a}	Released: June 13, 2006; Label: Norte/Columbia; Formats: CD, digital download	198	9	—	
Priceless	Released: October 17, 2006; Label: Columbia; Formats: CD, digital download	30	—	—	
Courage	Released: December 7, 2011; Label: Soulsick Musick; Formats: Digital download, CD	—	—	—	
Faith, Hope y Amor^{a}	Released: May 28, 2013; Label: Universal Music Latino; Formats: Digital download, CD	—	7	—	
Eleven	Released: July 27, 2017; Label: Soulsick Musick; Formats: Digital download	—	—	—	
Canciones Que Recuerdo	Released: May 15, 2020; Label: Soulsick Musick; Formats: Digital download	—	—	—	
Back2us	Released: February 22, 2022; Label: Soulsick Musick; Formats: Digital download	—	—	—	
"—" denotes a recording that did not chart or was not released in that territory.

=== Collaborative albums ===
Title	Details
Sangría (with Baby Bash)	Released: October 20, 2017; Label: Soulsick Musick; Formats: Digital download

=== Singles ===
==== As lead artist ====
Title	Year	Peak chart positions								Certifications	Album
Title	Year	US	US R&B	US Rhy.	US Latin	AUS	NZ	UK R&B	UK	Certifications	Album
"Don't Wanna Try"	2003	19	—	8	—	81	—	—	—		What's a Man to Do?
"We Still"	2003	—	—	22	—	—	—	—	—		What's a Man to Do?
"Ya No Es Igual"	2003	—	—	—	11	—	—	—	—		Frankie J
"Obsession (No Es Amor)" (featuring Baby Bash)	2005	3	69	2	3	5	4	24	38	RIAA: Gold; RIAA: Platinum (Mastertone); ARIA: Gold; RMNZ: Gold	The One
"How to Deal"	2005	39	—	6	—	—	—	—	—	RIAA: Gold	The One
"More Than Words"	2005	25	—	17	40	—	—	—	—	RIAA: Gold	The One
"Pensando En Ti"	2006	—	—	—	13	—	—	—	—		Un Nuevo Dia
"That Girl" (featuring Mannie Fresh and Chamillionaire)	2006	43	—	—	—	—	—	—	—		Priceless
"Daddy's Little Girl"	2006	123	—	18	—	—	—	—	—		Priceless
"If You Were My Girlfriend"	2009	—	—	—	—	—	—	—	—		Non-album singles
"Crush"	2009	—	—	—	—	—	—	—	—		Non-album singles
"How Beautiful You Are"	2011	—	—	—	—	—	—	—	—		Courage
"And I Had You There"	2011	—	—	—	—	—	—	—	—		Courage
"Santa Do Right"	2011	—	—	—	—	—	—	—	—		Non-album single
"That's Wussup" (featuring Baby Bash)	2012	—	—	—	—	—	—	—	—		Courage
"Ay, Ay, Ay"	2012	—	—	—	—	—	—	—	—		Faith, Hope, y Amor
"Tienes Que Creer En Mi"/"Take a Chance on Me"	2012	—	—	—	37	—	—	—	—		Faith, Hope, y Amor
"No Te Quiero Ver Con Él"	2013	—	—	—	—	—	—	—	—		Faith, Hope, y Amor
"Impossible"	2013	—	—	—	—	—	—	—	—		Faith, Hope, y Amor
"Beautiful" (featuring Pitbull)	2013	—	—	—	—	—	—	—	—		Faith, Hope, y Amor
"Breakin'"	2015	—	—	—	—	—	—	—	—		Non-album singles
"Let the Music Take Control" (featuring George LaMond)	2016	—	—	—	—	—	—	—	—		Non-album singles
"I Promise You"	2016	—	—	—	—	—	—	—	—		Non-album singles
"Riches in Heaven"	2016	—	—	—	—	—	—	—	—		Non-album singles
"Body Rock"	2016	—	—	—	—	—	—	—	—		Non-album singles
"Not So Dangerous"	2016	—	—	—	—	—	—	—	—		Non-album singles
"Lowrider" (featuring Baby Bash, C Kan, Ozomatli & Kid Frost)	2017	—	—	—	—	—	—	—	—		Non-album singles
"Candy Coated Dreamer"	2017	—	—	—	—	—	—	—	—		Non-album singles
"Body Yo Body" (with Baby Bash featuring Paula Deanda & Kap G)	2017	—	—	—	—	—	—	—	—		Non-album singles
"El Sueno" (with Humby featuring Romany)	2018	—	—	—	—	—	—	—	—		Night School
"Rush" (with Baby Bash and Baeza)	2018	—	—	—	—	—	—	—	—		Non-album singles
"Dame de Lo Tuyo" (with Raymor)	2018	—	—	—	—	—	—	—	—		Non-album singles
"Llevame Amarte" (with EMIL)	2018	—	—	—	—	—	—	—	—		Non-album singles
"I Hope He Breaks Your Heart"	2018	—	—	—	—	—	—	—	—		Non-album singles
"Nunca Voy a Olvidarte"	2019	—	—	—	—	—	—	—	—		Non-album singles
"Makes Me Weak" (featuring Baby Bash)	2019	—	—	—	—	—	—	—	—		Non-album singles
"Lo Que Pasó" (with Artifex)	2019	—	—	—	—	—	—	—	—		Non-album singles
"Con los Ojos Cerrados"	2019	—	—	—	—	—	—	—	—		Non-album singles
"Bring It Back"	2019	—	—	—	—	—	—	—	—		Non-album singles
"Delighted" (with Baby Bash)	2019	—	—	—	—	—	—	—	—		Non-album singles
"Borrón y Cuenta Nueva" (with Artifex)	2020	—	—	—	—	—	—	—	—		Non-album singles
"Sabor a Mi"	2020	—	—	—	—	—	—	—	—		Non-album singles
"Yo Estoy Aqui" (with David Rolas featuring Alcover and DJ Buddha)	2020	—	—	—	—	—	—	—	—		Non-album singles
"One Woman"	2020	—	—	—	—	—	—	—	—		Non-album singles
"With You" (featuring Raz B and Paul Wall)	2021	—	—	—	—	—	—	—	—		Back2us
"Eres Bueno" (with Gerardo and Alex Zurdo)	2021	—	—	—	—	—	—	—	—		Non-album singles
"My Love Is on the Way" (featuring Baby Bash)	2021	—	—	—	—	—	—	—	—		Back2us
"Pretty Brown Eyes (PBE)" (featuring Mellow Man Ace)	2021	—	—	—	—	—	—	—	—		Back2us
"El Único"	2022	—	—	—	—	—	—	—	—		Non-album singles
"Devil Woman" (featuring Baby Bash)	2022	—	—	—	—	—	—	—	—		Non-album singles
"The Only One"	2022	—	—	—	—	—	—	—	—		Non-album singles
"Never Giving up on You"	2024	—	—	—	—	—	—	—	—		Non-album singles
"—" denotes a recording that did not chart or was not released in that territory.											Non-album singles

==== As featured artist ====
Title	Year	Peak chart positions										Certifications	Album
Title	Year	US	US R&B	US Rap	AUS	CZE	FRA	GER	NZ	POL	SWI	Certifications	Album
"Suga Suga" (Baby Bash featuring Frankie J)	2003	7	54	10	3	12	11	4	1	18	2	RIAA: 4× Platinum; ARIA: Platinum; BPI: Silver; BVMI: Gold; RMNZ: 3× Platinum	Tha Smokin' Nephew
"Acapella" (Mikolas Josef featuring Fito Blanko and Frankie J)	2019	—	—	—	—	1	—	—	—	2	—		Non-album single
"Beso" (Kamran & Hooman featuring Frankie J)													
"—" denotes a recording that did not chart or was not released in that territory.

=== Guest appearances ===
Title	Year	Artist(s)	Album
"Ménage à Trois"	2003	Baby Bash featuring Frankie J & Powda	Tha Smokin' Nephew
"Ménage à Trois"	2004	Baby Bash featuring Shadow, Don Cisco & Frankie J	Ménage à Trois
"Hot Zone"	2004	Baby Bash featuring Frost, Nino Brown & Frankie J	Ménage à Trois
"Are You Still Alone"	2005	Play-N-Skillz featuring Frankie J	The Process
"Los Infieles (Remix)"	2006	Aventura featuring Frankie J	Non-album single
"Run Away"	2006	Bubba Sparxxx featuring Frankie J	The Charm
"Lifted"	2007	Latino Velvet featuring Frankie J & Malik	The Camp Is Back
"Perfect Girl"	2007	Los Super Reyes featuring Frankie J & Damon Reel	El Regreso De Los Reyes
"Tell Me (Remix)"	2007	Pitbull featuring Frankie J & Ken-Y	The Boatlift
"Be Gone"	2007	First Class Fiction featuring Frankie J	Overdue
"Slow It Down"	2008	Lil Rob featuring Frankie J	Twelve Eighteen, Pt. 2
"To the Top"	2008	Omar Cruz featuring Frankie J	Sign of the Cruz
"Eres (Remix)"	2009	Los Super Reyes featuring Frankie J	Non-album single
"Night & Day"	2010	Cuete Yeska featuring Frankie J	Love Stories 2: The Notebook
"You Deserve Better"	2010	Cuete Yeska featuring Frankie J	Love Stories 2: The Notebook
"Rebound"	2010	Jump Smokers featuring Frankie J	Kings of the Dancefloor
"El Reloj No Perdona"	2011	Syko "El Terror" featuring Frankie J	The Sykology: The Mixtape
"Number 1"	2011	Royalty featuring Frankie J	Non-album singles
"La Nave Del Olvido (Remix)"	2011	Cristian Castro featuring Frankie J	Non-album singles
"Inevitable"	2011	Gemini featuring Frankie J	Non-album singles
"I'm Not Coming Home"	2011	Play-N-Skillz featuring Frankie J	Red October
"Butterfly Kisses"	2013	Baby Bash & Frankie J featuring Paula DeAnda	Non-album single
"Te Quedarás"	2014	Dulce María featuring Frankie J	Sin Fronteras
"Enseñar Amar"	2016	Beatriz Gonzalez featuring Frankie J	Enseñar Amar
"Bad of the Heart (25th Anniversary Live)"	2016	George Lamond featuring Frankie J	Non-album singles
"Na Na Na"	2016	Superstar Guess featuring Frankie J	Non-album singles
"Love Me / Amame"	2016	J Grace featuring Frankie J	Non-album singles
"Extraño"	2016	Jon Carmen featuring Frankie J	Jon Carmen
"Si Una Vez (If I Once)"	2017	Play-N-Skillz featuring Frankie J, Wisin & Leslie Grace	Non-album singles
"Vámonos"	2017	Baby Bash featuring Frankie J	Non-album singles
"Te Quiero Hacer Feliz"	2023	Morenito de Fuego featuring Frankie J	TXMX
"Tu Forma de ser (Love your way)"	2024	Magic Juan featuring Frankie J & David Anthony	Non-album single
"Sola"	2024	xBValentine featuring Frankie J	Non-album single
"Cobarde - Acoustic Mix"	2024	Christian Alicea featuring Frankie J	Yo Deluxe
"5AM"	2024	Anna Mvze featuring Frankie J	Non-album single
"Beso"	2024	Kamran & Hooman featuring Frankie J	Non-album single
