= Priceless (Frankie J album) =

Studio album by Frankie J
- Released: October 17, 2006
- Studios: Studio 7303 (Houston, TX); Record Plant (Los Angeles, CA); Ameraycan Studios (North Hollywood, CA); Digital Services (Houston, TX); Battery Studios (New York, NY); Sony Music Studios (New York, NY); Sonikwire Studios (Irvine, CA)
- Length: 47:59
- Label: Columbia
- Producers: Bryan-Michael Cox; DJ Clue; Frankie J; Happy Perez; Jovonn "The Don" Alexander; Mannie Fresh; Mike Caren; Play-N-Skillz; StarGate; Steve-O Valdez

Frankie J chronology
| Un Nuevo Dia (2006) | Priceless (2006) | Courage (2011) |

Singles from Priceless
- 1. "That Girl" Released: July 25, 2006; 2. "Daddy's Little Girl" Released: October 20, 2006; 3. "If He Can't Be" Released: February 20, 2007

Priceless is the fifth studio album by Mexican-American singer Frankie J and his third English-language album. It was released on October 17, 2006, via Columbia Records. Recording sessions took place at Studio 7303 and Digital Services in Houston, Record Plant in Los Angeles, Ameraycan Studios in North Hollywood, Battery Studios and Sony Music Studios in New York, and Sonikwire Studios in Irvine.

Production was handled by Mannie Fresh, Mike Caren, Play-N-Skillz, Happy Perez, Steve-O Valdez, Bryan-Michael Cox, DJ Clue, Jovonn "The Don" Alexander, StarGate, and Frankie J himself, who also served as executive producer together with Charles Chavez. It features guest appearances from Chamillionaire, Krayzie Bone, Layzie Bone, Mannie Fresh and Slim.

== Release ==
The album spawned three singles: "That Girl", "Daddy's Little Girl" and "If He Can't Be". Its lead single, "That Girl" debuted on the Billboard Hot 100 on August 17, 2006, at number 100, ultimately peaking at number 43 by October 7. An alternate version featuring Slim Thug instead of Chamillionaire has been leaked, but was never released.

== Critical reception ==
Professional ratings
Review scores
| Source | Rating |
|---|---|
| About.com | 3/5 stars |
| AllMusic | 2.5/5 stars |
| USA Today | 2.5/4 stars |

Andy Kellman of AllMusic found that though Frankie J. "continues to work the smooth ballads and light mid-tempo material with a remarkable degree of finesse, the album contains another handful of attempts at sculpting a tougher image. While the strategy might result in the occasional hit single, it's never a good look for him. Again, he doesn't step too far outside his comfort level on the tracks [...] For the most part, the singer goes with his strengths and delivers another decent album that should at least sustain his loyal following". Elysa Gardner of USA Today gave Priceless a two-and-a-half-star rating, praising his confident vocals and pop-soul style. He highlighted the album's Michael Jackson-inspired energy while noting that weaker filler tracks limited its overall impact.

== Chart performance ==
Priceless did not perform as well as expected, compared to Frankie's 2005 platinum success The One, which debuted at number three. The album debuted at number thirty on the US Billboard 200, selling about 26,000 copies in its first week, then declined in sales, staying on the chart for only three weeks. As of January 2007, the album had sold around 70,000 copies.

== Track listing ==
| No. | Title | Writer(s) | Producer(s) | Length |
|---|---|---|---|---|
| 1. | "That Girl" (featuring Mannie Fresh and Chamillionaire) | Francisco Javier Bautista Jr.; Byron Thomas; Hakeem Seriki; Juan Salinas; Oscar Salinas; J.C. Reyez | Mannie Fresh | 3:59 |
| 2. | "Priceless" | Bautista; Bryan-Michael Cox; Adonis Shropshire | Bryan-Michael Cox; Adonis^{[a]} | 4:42 |
| 3. | "Never Let You Down" (featuring Layzie Bone and Krayzie Bone) | Bautista; Steven Howse; Anthony Henderson; J. Salinas; O. Salinas | Play-N-Skillz | 4:19 |
| 4. | "Daddy's Little Girl" | Bautista; Claude Kelly; Nathan Perez; Steve-O Valdez | Frankie J; Happy Perez^{[b]}; Steve-O Valdez^{[c]} | 4:14 |
| 5. | "If He Can't Be" | Bautista; Ryan Tedder; Michael Caren; William Michael Albert Broad; Steve Stevens | Mike Caren | 4:26 |
| 6. | "Say Something" | Bautista; Kelly; Ernesto Shaw; Jovonn Alexander | DJ Clue; Jovonn "The Don" Alexander | 3:54 |
| 7. | "Hurry Up" | Shaffer Smith; Tor E. Hermansen; Mikkel S. Eriksen | StarGate | 3:31 |
| 8. | "Is This What You Call Love" | Bautista; Valdez | Frankie J | 4:10 |
| 9. | "Top of the Line" (featuring Slim) | Bautista; Marvin Scandrick; J. Salinas; O. Salinas; Reyez | Play-N-Skillz | 3:18 |
| 10. | "Dance" | Bautista; Tedder; Caren | Mike Caren | 3:24 |
| 11. | "Still" | Bautista; Perez; Valdez | Happy Perez; Steve-O Valdez | 4:22 |
| 12. | "I Ain't Trippin" | Bautista; Thomas; J. Salinas; O. Salinas; Reyez | Mannie Fresh | 3:36 |
| Total length: | | | | 47:59 |

Best Buy bonus track
| No. | Title | Length |
|---|---|---|
| 13. | "Where Did Our Love Go" | 3:22 |

iTunes bonus track
| No. | Title | Length |
|---|---|---|
| 13. | "Break" | 4:13 |

Walmart bonus track
| No. | Title | Length |
|---|---|---|
| 13. | "Luv U Down" | 3:20 |

Notes

- ^{^[a]}signifies an additional vocal producer.
- ^{^[b]}signifies a co-producer.
- ^{^[c]}signifies an additional producer.

Sample credits

- Track 5 contains elements of "Eyes Without a Face" written by William Michael Albert Broad and Steve Stevens and performed by Billy Idol.

== Personnel ==
- Francisco Javier "Frankie J" Bautista Jr. — vocals, producer (tracks: 4, 8), executive producer
- Byron "Mannie Fresh" Thomas — vocals (track 1), producer (tracks: 1, 12)
- Hakeem "Chamillionaire" Seriki — vocals (track 1)
- Steven "Layzie Bone" Howse — vocals (track 3)
- Anthony "Krayzie Bone" Henderson — vocals (track 3)
- Marvin "Slim" Scandrick — vocals (track 9)
- Charles Pettaway — guitar & bass (tracks: 1, 10, 12)
- Dennis Moorehead — keyboards (tracks: 1, 12)
- Steve-O Valdez — piano & percussion (track 8), producer (track 11), additional producer (track 4)
- David Campbell — strings arranger (track 8)
- Bryan-Michael Cox — producer (track 2)
- Juan Carlos Salinas — producer (tracks: 3, 9)
- Oscar Edward Salinas — producer (tracks: 3, 9)
- Mike Caren — producer (tracks: 5, 10)
- Ernesto "DJ Clue?" Shaw — producer (track 6)
- Jovonn "The Don" Alexander — producer (track 6)
- Tor E. Hermansen — producer (track 7)
- Mikkel S. Eriksen — producer (track 7)
- Nathan "Happy" Pérez — producer (track 11), co-producer (track 4)
- Adonis Shropshire — additional vocal producer (track 2)
- Philip M. Jones II — recording (track 1)
- Sam Thomas — recording & mixing (track 2)
- Geoff Gibbs — recording (track 3)
- James Hoover — recording (tracks: 4, 8, 9, 11), mixing (tracks: 1, 3, 4, 7–9, 11, 12)
- Tatsuya Sato — recording (tracks: 5–7, 10)
- Alex Bush — recording (track 7)
- Howard White — recording (track 12)
- Marq Moody — recording assistant (track 1)
- Leslie Brathwaite — mixing (tracks: 1, 12)
- Manny Marroquin — mixing (tracks: 5, 10)
- Ken "Duro" Ifill — mixing (track 6)
- Phil Tan — mixing (track 7)
- Josh Houghkirk — mixing assistant (track 7)
- Mark Santangelo — mastering
- Vlado Meller — mastering
- Charles Chavez — executive producer, management
- Chris Woehrle — art direction, design
- Ronald Cadiz — photography
- Keith Naftaly — A&R
- John Doelp — A&R
- Teryl Gray — A&R

== Charts ==
| Chart (2006) | Peak position |
|---|---|
| US Billboard 200 | 30 |
| US Top R&B/Hip-Hop Albums (Billboard) | 17 |
