= When I'm President =

When I'm President may refer to:

- When I'm President (song), a song from rock band Extreme
- When I'm President (album), an album from musician Ian Hunter
