= The One (Frankie J album) =

Studio album by Frankie J
- Released: March 22, 2005
- Genre: Pop
- Length: 54:49
- Label: Columbia
- Producers: Bryan-Michael Cox; Frankie J; Happy Perez; Irv Gotti; Malcolm Flythe; Mario Winans; Night & Day; Soulshock & Karlin; Steve Russell

Frankie J chronology
Frankie J (2003)	The One (2005)	Un Nuevo Dia (2006)

Singles from The One
- 1. "Obsession (No Es Amor)" Released: January 10, 2005; 2. "How to Deal" Released: March 22, 2005; 3. "More Than Words" Released: September 13, 2005

Professional ratings
Review scores
Source	Rating
AllMusic	3/5 stars
PopMatters	7/10

The One is the third studio album and second English-language full-length by Mexican-American singer Frankie J. It was released on March 22, 2005, via Columbia Records. Production was handled by Bryan-Michael Cox, Happy Perez, Irv Gotti, Malcolm Flythe, Mario Winans, Night & Day, Soulshock & Karlin, Steve Russell, and Frankie J himself. It features guest appearances from Baby Bash, 3LW and Paul Wall.

The album debuted at number 3 on both the Billboard 200 and Top R&B/Hip-Hop Albums charts with first-week sales of over 130,000 copies in the United States. It was certified platinum by the Recording Industry Association of America on January 4, 2006, for selling 1,000,000 units in the US alone.

The album was supported by three charted singles: "Obsession (No Es Amor)", "How to Deal" and "More Than Words". Its lead single, a cover version of Aventura's "Obsesión", had been receiving heavy rotation on radio stations and peaked at number 3 on the US Billboard Hot 100, number 4 in New Zealand, number 5 in Australia and number 38 in the UK. It was certified platinum by the RIAA on June 14, 2006. The album's follow-up single, "How to Deal", made it to number 39 on the Billboard Hot 100 and received RIAA's gold certification on May 25, 2006.

On October 11, 2005, The One saw a re-release in a dual disc format which included a cover single of the song "More Than Words" by Extreme, with the DVD portion offering the whole album in enhanced stereo quality sound. The "More Than Words" music video (in both English and Spanish) came with a behind-the-scenes look with Frankie J, titled "Along for the Ride". The single reached number 25 on the Billboard Hot 100 and received RIAA's gold certification on January 25, 2006.

== Critical reception ==
AllMusic editor Andy Kellman remarked that on The One, Frankie J "continues to work closely with Happy Perez, but Cox's presence on not one but three tracks [...] adds significant heft to his catalog [...] The One is a step forward in every aspect. Lead single "Obsession (No Es Amor)" shot up to the Top Ten upon release, only solidifying J's mainstream presence".

== Track listing ==
No.	Title	Writer(s)	Producer(s)	Length
1.	"Obsession (No Es Amor)" (featuring Baby Bash)	Anthony Santos	Happy Perez	3:45
2.	"The One" (featuring 3LW)	Francisco Javier Bautista; Adrienne Bailon-Houghton; Kiely Williams; Malcolm Flythe; Irving Lorenzo; Kendred T. Smith; Charles Chavez	Malcolm Flythe; Irv Gotti; Jimi Kendrix^{[a]}	4:03
3.	"More Than Words"			4:01
4.	"How to Deal"	Bautista; Bryan-Michael Cox	Bryan-Michael Cox	3:50
5.	"Without You"	Bautista; Carsten Schack; Kenneth Karlin; Alexander Cantrall	Soulshock and Karlin	4:13
6.	"On the Floor" (featuring Paul Wall)	Bautista; Cox; Tayari McIntosh; Georgios Kyriacos Panayiotou	Bryan-Michael Cox	4:03
7.	"Story of My Life"	Bautista; Nathan Perez	Happy Perez	4:36
8.	"#1 Fan"	Tonyatta Martinez; Gasner Hughes; David McPherson; Antoine Tatum; Ali Rodgers	Night & Day	3:50
9.	"Just Can't Say It's Love"	Bautista; Mario Winans; Michael Jones; Jack Knight; Tommie McLaughlin; Andre Young; Lorenzo Patterson	Mario Winans	3:33
10.	"In the Moment"	Bautista; Cox	Bryan-Michael Cox	3:24
11.	"Gone"	Steven L. Russell; Mischke Butler	Steve Russell	4:33

Bonus tracks
No.	Title	Producer(s)	Length
12.	"Don't Wanna Try"	Frankie J; Jaime Galvez^{[a]}	4:05
13.	"Suga Suga" (featuring Baby Bash)	Happy Perez	3:58
14.	"Obsession (No Es Amor)" (Spanish Version)	Happy Perez	3:21
15.	"Obsession (No Es Amor) (Luny Tunes Reggaeton Remix)" (featuring Mr. Phillips)		3:35
Total length:			58:50

Notes

- ^{^[a]}signifies co-producer(s).
- ^{^[b]}signifies additional producer(s).
- "More Than Words" is omitted from the original version.

Sample credits

- "On the Floor" contains excerpts from "Everything She Wants" by Wham!
- "Just Can't Say It's Love" contains a sample of "If It Ain't Ruff" by N.W.A.

== Charts ==
=== Weekly charts ===
Chart (2005)	Peak position
Australian Albums (ARIA Charts)	88
New Zealand Albums (RMNZ)	40
UK R&B Albums (Official Charts)	37
US Billboard 200	3
US Top R&B/Hip-Hop Albums (Billboard)	3

=== Year-end charts ===
Chart (2005)	Position
US Billboard 200	81
US Top R&B/Hip-Hop Albums (Billboard)	53

== Certifications ==
Region	Certification	Certified units/sales
United States (RIAA)	Platinum	1,000,000^{^}
^{^} Shipments figures based on certification alone.
