= What's a Man to Do =

Studio album by Frankie J
- Released: May 27, 2003
- Recorded: 2002–2003
- Genre: Pop; R&B
- Length: 46:16
- Label: Columbia
- Producer: Frankie J; Happy Perez

Frankie J chronology
What's a Man to Do (2003)	Frankie J (2003)

Singles from What's a Man to Do
- 1. "Don't Wanna Try" Released: April 8, 2003; 2. "We Still" Released: 2003

Professional ratings
Review scores
Source	Rating
AllMusic	2.5/5 stars

What's a Man to Do? is the debut solo studio album by Mexican-American singer Frankie J. It was released on May 27, 2003 via Columbia Records. Produced by Frankie J himself together with Happy Perez, it features guest appearances from Baby Bash, Gemini, Max Minelli and Russell Lee. In the United States, the album peaked at number 53 on the Billboard 200 and number 33 on the Top R&B/Hip-Hop Albums charts. Its lead single, "Don't Wanna Try", reached number 19 on the Billboard Hot 100 songs chart.

== Track listing ==
No.	Title	Length
1.	"What's a Man to Do?"	4:19
2.	"Won't Change" (featuring Gemini)	4:18
3.	"Interlude"	0:33
4.	"We Still"	3:04
5.	"Wanna Know"	3:55
6.	"Diggin Your Style" (featuring Baby Bash)	4:28
7.	"Don't Wanna Try"	4:06
8.	"Just the Way" (featuring Gemini)	3:57
9.	"Be Home Soon"	4:10
10.	"Drinks on Me" (featuring Baby Bash)	4:41
11.	"From the Outside Looking In" (featuring Russell Lee and Max Minelli)	4:38
12.	"Ya No Es Igual"	4:07
Total length:		46:16

== Charts ==
Chart (2003)	Peak position
US Billboard 200	53
US Top R&B/Hip-Hop Albums (Billboard)	33
