= Abu Dhabi (Mikolas Josef song) =

Song

Single by Mikolas Josef
- Released: 1 February 2019
- Recorded: 2018
- Genre: Pop
- Length: 2:38
- Label: Sony Music Entertainment
- Songwriter(s): Christophe Vitorino De Almeida; Jenson Vaughan; Mikolas Josef; Sarah Raba; Walid Benmerieme
- Producer(s): Adam Trigger; Chris Meid; Mikolas Josef

Mikolas Josef singles chronology
"Me Gusta" (2018)	"Abu Dhabi" (2019)	"Acapella" (2019)

"Abu Dhabi" is a song by Czech singer Mikolas Josef. It was released as a Digital download on 1 February 2019 through Sony Music Entertainment. The song was written by Christophe Vitorino De Almeida, Jenson Vaughan, Mikolas Josef, Sarah Raba and Walid Benmerieme.

== Music video ==
A music video to accompany the release of "Abu Dhabi" was first released onto YouTube on 31 January 2019 at a total length of two minutes and thirty-seven seconds.

== Track listing ==
Digital download
No.	Title	Length
1.	"Abu Dhabi"	2:38

== Personnel ==
Credits adapted from Tidal.

- Adam Trigger – Producer
- Chris Meid – Producer
- Mikolas Josef – Producer, composer, lyricist, associated performer
- Christophe Vitorino De Almeida – Composer, lyricist
- Jenson Vaughan – Composer, lyricist, vocal producer
- Sarah Raba – Composer, lyricist
- Walid Benmerieme – Composer, lyricist
- Nikodem Milewski – Co-Producer, mastering engineer, mixing engineer

== Charts ==
Chart (2019)	Peak position
Czech Republic (Singles Digitál Top 100)	22

== Release history ==
Region	Date	Format	Label
Czech Republic	1 February 2019	Digital download	Sony Music Entertainment
