= Mourning Widows (album) =

Studio album by Mourning Widows
- Released: December 16, 1998
- Recorded: 1997–1998
- Genre: Rock
- Length: 1:07:59
- Label: Bruno Graffiti Records (US); Polydor Records (Japan)

Mourning Widows chronology
Mourning Widows (1998)	Furnished Souls for Rent (2000)

Professional ratings
Review scores
Source	Rating
Allmusic	link

Mourning Widows is an album by Mourning Widows, a project led by former Extreme guitarist Nuno Bettencourt. The album was first released by Polydor Records in Japan and later in the United States.

== Track listing ==
All tracks written by Nuno Bettencourt, except where noted.

1. "All Automatic" – 6:53
2. "Paint the Town Red" – 4:54
3. "The Temp" – 4:33
4. "The Air You That You Breathe" – 4:40
5. "I Wanna Be Your Friend" – 7:07
6. "Hotel Asylum" – 5:52
7. "Over & Out" – 4:50
8. "Love Is a Cigarette" – 6:18
9. "Too Late" – 5:02
10. "True Love in the Galaxy" (Bettencourt, Anthony J. Resta) – 6:55
11. "Sex In a Jar" (demo) – 5:41
12. "And the Winner is..." (demo) – 5:23

== Personnel ==
- Nuno Bettencourt – guitars, vocals, (credited as "Billy Vegas"), producer
- Donovan Bettencourt – bass
- Rodrigo Leal - Drums
