= Daddy's Little Girl (Frankie J song) =

Single by Frankie J

from the album Priceless
- Released: October 20, 2006
- Recorded: 2006
- Genre: R&B, pop, Latin, Hip hop
- Length: 4:14
- Label: Columbia Records
- Songwriters: Francisco Bautista, Jr., David Sanchez, Claude Kelly, Nathan Perez, Steve Valdez
- Producers: Frankie J, Happy Perez (co.)

Frankie J singles chronology
"That Girl" (2006)	"Daddy's Little Girl" (2006)	"If You Were My Girlfriend" (2009)

"Daddy's Little Girl" is the second single lifted from Frankie J's third English-language album, Priceless. The version of the song used in the video is a slightly different edit than the album version. The song failed to chart, although it narrowly entered the Bubbling Under Hot 100 Singles. It features more serious subject matter than his previous singles. "Daddy's Little Girl" discusses how many fathers will not be there for their daughters; sometimes they leave and never return.

== Music video ==
The music video for this song features three different scenarios of father-daughter relationships. The video was shot black and white in order to reinforce the subject of the song. In the first scenario, a father argues with his daughter's mother, which doesn't go so well. Despite the pleas of the frightened girl, nothing worked out, but the father gave one last sign of his dedication to the saddened daughter. In the second scenario, an old father is dying by the seconds of heart failure. His daughter, a grown woman, is sitting by his bed weeping in vain. Although the father is losing strength by the minute, he and his daughter embrace for the last time, and the father uses the last of his strength to show his outlived dedication to the woman. In the last scenario, the father is going away to Iraq. His daughter embraces him a final time, then gives a military salute as she sees him off. Scenes cut from the final video include Frankie J playing the piano and singing in front of a wall entangled with vines.

== CD Single ==
1. Daddy's Little Girl (Radio Edit)
2. Daddy's Little Girl (Album Version)
3. If You Break Featuring Nicholas Strunk
