= Un Nuevo Dia =

Studio album by Frankie J
- Released: June 13, 2006
- Recorded: 2005–2006
- Genres: Latin pop; R&B
- Length: 50:02
- Label: Columbia
- Producers: Frankie J, Charles Chávez

Frankie J chronology
The One (2005)	Un Nuevo Dia (2006)	Priceless (2006)

Singles from Un Nuevo Dia
- 1. "Pensando En Ti" Released: 2006

Professional ratings
Review scores
Source	Rating
Allmusic	link

Un Nuevo Dia is the fourth studio album and second Spanish language album by Frankie J. Released on June 13, 2006, Un Nuevo Dia spawned the hit single "Pensando En Ti".

Although only charting at #196 on the Billboard 200 chart, the album did exceptionally well on the Latin charts peaking at #9. Un Nuevo Dia has since been certified Gold.

== Track listing ==
No.	Title	Length
1.	"Intro"	1:30
2.	"Un Nuevo Dia" (featuring Bimbo)	4:33
3.	"Pensando en Ti"	5:00
4.	"Por Favor" (featuring Sin Bandera)	3:34
5.	"Quien"	4:13
6.	"Amor de Verdad" (featuring Rob G)	4:18
7.	"Estar a Tu Lado"	3:42
8.	"Obsesión (No Es Amor)"	3:20
9.	"Volar"	3:35
10.	"Tu Eres Mi Hogar"	3:46
11.	"Aun Te Amo"	4:03
12.	"Como Aceptar" ("How to Deal" Spanish version)	3:51
13.	"Mucho Mas" ("More Than Words" Spanish version)	4:02
14.	"Outro"	0:30

Walmart bonus track
No.	Title	Length
15.	"No Quiero"	4:29

Target bonus tracks
No.	Title	Length
15.	"Vamos"	3:56
16.	"Pensando En Ti" (Reggaeton Mix) (featuring Cosculluela)	3:43
