= Colorado (Mikolas Josef song) =

Single by Mikolas Josef
- Released: 29 November 2019
- Recorded: 2019
- Length: 2:31
- Label: Vivienne
- Songwriter: Mikolas Josef
- Producers: Corey Le Rue; Mikolas Josef

Mikolas Josef singles chronology
"Acapella" (2019)	"Colorado" (2019)	"Lalalalalalalalalala" (2020)

"Colorado" is a song by Czech singer Mikolas Josef. It was released as a Digital download on 29 November 2019 by Vivienne Records. The song was written by Mikolas Josef, who also produced the song with Corey Le Rue.

== Critical reception ==
Antranig Shokayan from Wiwibloggs gave the song a positive review stating, "Musically, the evolution is apparent — his post-Eurovision singles have all had unique sounds. Nonetheless, Mikolas does what he does best, nailing slick choreography and oozing major sex appeal. Eurovision’s Next Top Male Model knows what he wants and he will cross any Colorado desert to get it."

== Music video ==
A music video to accompany the release of "Colorado" was first released onto YouTube on 28 November 2019. The music video was directed by Marco Grillotti and Mikolas Josef.

== Charts ==
=== Weekly charts ===
Chart (2019–2020)	Peak position
Czech Republic Airplay (ČNS IFPI)	46
Czech Republic Singles Digital (ČNS IFPI)	64
Poland Airplay (ZPAV)	5

=== Year-end charts ===
Chart (2020)	Position
Poland (ZPAV)	87

== Release history ==
Region	Date	Format	Label
Czech Republic	29 November 2019	Digital download; streaming	Vivienne Records
