= Lalalalalalalalalala =

Single by Mikolas Josef
- Released: 9 October 2020
- Recorded: 2019
- Length: 2:41
- Label: Vivienne
- Songwriter: Mikolas Josef
- Producers: Cristiano Cesario; Marco Quisisana; Mikolas Josef

Mikolas Josef singles chronology
"Colorado" (2019)	"Lalalalalalalalalala" (2020)	"Boys Don't Cry" (2023)

"Lalalalalalalalalala" is a song by Czech singer Mikolas Josef, released as a digital single on 9 October 2020 by Vivienne Records. The song was written by Josef, who also co-produced the song with Cristiano Cesario and Marco Quisisana.

== Background ==
Writing on his Instagram account, Josef thanked his fans for their ongoing support over the past year, a period during which he took a leave of absence from his record label and had to cope with anxiety en route to rebuilding himself, he said, "Tonight is not only about releasing a new single & merch. Tonight I step over the shadows I believed will be the end of me. We all got our demons and reasons to feel beaten down and I sincerely pray everyone emerges victorious from their struggles. Today that is my only wish. This one is for the fighters. Let the song be a reminder to everyone that when you take arms against the sea of troubles you already won. Thank you for your patience. And to all those who made me what I am now."

== Music video ==
A music video to accompany the release of "Lalalalalalalalalala" was released onto YouTube on 19 October 2020.

== Track listing ==
Digital download
No.	Title	Length
1.	"Lalalalalalalalalala"	2:41

Digital download
No.	Title	Length
1.	"Lalalalalalalalalala" (Acoustic)	2:18

== Personnel ==
Credits adapted from Tidal.

- Cristiano Cesario – Producer, composer
- Marco Quisisana – Producer, composer
- Mikolas Josef – Producer, composer, writer

== Charts ==
Chart (2020)	Peak position
Czech Republic Airplay (ČNS IFPI)	18
Czech Republic Singles Digital (ČNS IFPI)	29
Poland Airplay (ZPAV)	21

== Release history ==
Region	Date	Format	Label
Czech Republic	9 October 2020	Digital download; streaming	Vivienne Records
