= Schizophonic (Nuno Bettencourt album) =

Studio album by Nuno
- Released: February 11, 1997
- Recorded: 1992–1996
- Genre: Alternative rock
- Length: 57:54
- Label: A&M
- Producers: Nuno, Bob St. John, Anthony J. Resta

Professional ratings
Review scores
Source	Rating
AllMusic	3/5 stars

Schizophonic is the 1997 debut solo album by the American guitarist Nuno Bettencourt, the lead guitarist in the band Extreme. Bettencourt is credited on the cover simply as "Nuno". Schizophonic is Bettencourt's first and, so far, only solo effort after the group disbanded, although the 2003 release Population 1 is considered Bettencourt's second solo album.

== Overview ==
In face of the then-current musical trends, Bettencourt added an alternative rock edge to his style. Bettencourt wrote with producer Anthony J. Resta, known for his work with Duran Duran around their big comeback. The album features Restas' Enoesque soundscapes on many of the songs. Bettencourt later went on to record two records leading the band Mourning Widows, one with Population 1 (mostly recorded on his own) and then another with the same touring band but with a different name: Dramagods. Schizophonic's recording started over a stretch of time during Extreme's tour for their last studio album, Waiting for the Punchline.

Bettencourt wrote most of the songs and played most of the instruments on the album, except for "You", on which vocals are shared with co-author and Extreme bandmate Gary Cherone, drums on "Swollen Princess" and "Fine By Me" (Mike Mangini) and "Fallen Angels", and "Note in the Screen Door", "Karmalaa", and "Severed" which were written with Anthony J. Resta. The album cover featured Bettencourt dressed as a woman and with a prominent scar on his forehead.

== Track listing ==
All songs written by Bettencourt, except where noted.

1. "Gravity" – 3:45
2. "Swollen Princess" – 3:12
3. "Crave" – 3:45
4. "What you Want" – 3:31
5. "Fallen Angels" (Bettencourt, Anthony J. Resta) – 4:00
6. "2 Weeks In Dizkneelande" – 3:16
7. "Pursuit Of Happiness" (Bettencourt, Gary Cherone) – 3:33
8. "Fine By Me" – 3:42
9. "Karmalaa" (Bettencourt, Resta) – 3:26
10. "Confrontation" – 3:46
11. "Note on The Screen Door" (Bettencourt, Resta) – 4:13
12. "I Wonder" – 4:21
13. "Got To Have You" – 4:53
14. "You" (Bettencourt, Cherone) – 4:25
15. "Severed" – (Bettencourt, Resta) – 4:06
16. "Hop The Train" (Japanese Bonus Track)
17. "Garbage" (Japanese Bonus Track)

== Personnel ==
- Nuno Bettencourt – vocals, guitars, bass, drums
- Gary Cherone – vocals on track 14
- Mike Mangini – drums on tracks 2 and 8
