= Furnished Souls for Rent =

Studio album by Mourning Widows
- Released: October 31, 2000
- Recorded: 1999–2000
- Genre: Rock
- Length: 56:47
- Label: Polygram International

Mourning Widows chronology
Mourning Widows (1998)	Furnished Souls for Rent (2000)

Alternative cover

Professional ratings
Review scores
Source	Rating
Allmusic	3/5 stars

Furnished Souls for Rent is the second and final album released by Mourning Widows, a band led by former Extreme guitarist Nuno Bettencourt.

== Track listing ==
All lyrics written by Nuno Bettencourt. All music written by Nuno Bettencourt, except where noted.

1. "All Automatic" - 4:51
2. "No Regrets" - 4:43
3. "UpsideDownside" - 4:42
4. "667" - 4:35
5. "The Air That You Breathe" - 4:49
6. "Fuck You" (Donovan Bettencourt, Jeff Consi & Nuno Bettencourt) - 4:53
7. "Space" - 5:33
8. "Angerexia" (Donovan Bettencourt, Jeff Consi & Nuno Bettencourt) - 5:01
9. "Monkey Paw" (Donovan Bettencourt, Jeff Consi & Nuno Bettencourt) - 4:04
10. "The Swing" (Donovan Bettencourt, Jeff Consi & Nuno Bettencourt) - 4:01
11. "War Paint" (Donovan Bettencourt, Jeff Consi & Nuno Bettencourt) - 4:24
12. "Furnished Souls For Rent" - 5:05

Other songs that were demos considered for the album were "N.O.Y.B.", "The Police", "Home Division", "SOS (Save Our Souls)" and "Unhappy Birthday", which ended up on the next album from Population 1.

== Band members ==
- Nuno Bettencourt - guitar and lead vocals
- Donovan Bettencourt - bass and vocals
- Jeff Consi - drums and vocals
