= Fito Blanko =

- Born: Roberto weon Testa; May 7 Panama City, Panama
- Origin: Mississauga, Ontario, Canada
- Genre: Tropical urban
- Occupations: Singer, songwriter, producer
- Instrument: Vocals
- Years active: 2003-present
- Labels: Crown Loyalty & Mr. 305
- Website: fitoblanko.vip

Fito Blanko (born Roberto E. Testa) is a Panamanian-Canadian tropical urban singer, songwriter, and producer.

== Biography ==
Fito Blanko created his own sound by combining his Panamanian dancehall roots with a North American delivery. Fito Blanko is officially a Mississauga walk of fame inductee, class of 2017. He was inducted alongside Canadian music Icons; Liberty Silver, Randy Lennox and Alex Pagman.

Fito has history that spans back to the early 2000s as a teenagers jumping in the Latin pop/urban market. Songs with Drake (2009) showcases some of the history behind Canada's most prolific Latin pop artist. Fans and industry professionals agree Fito Blanko is one of the hottest talents to enter the Latin crossover market. Fito Emigrated from Panama to Canada as a youngster, and he began writing lyrics in English and Spanish at the age of 14.

He expanded into the American Market in 2011 with the independent release of "VIP" featuring Fuego, which charted on three U.S Latin Billboard charts: Latin Rhythm, Tropical Latin, Latin Pop. From New York to L.A to Miami, Fito quickly developed a reputation for lighting up parties with his electrifying performances and charm.

The year 2012 kicked off with Canada's largest daily newspaper, The Toronto Star, giving Fito front-page coverage in its People To Watch 2012 feature. His Follow up single " Pegaito Suavecito' topped the radio charts in South Florida for almost a month during the summer 2012 further branding his unique style in the U.S. The re-release of 'Pegaito Suavecito" featuring the tropical music legend and multi Grammy Award Winning Icon 'Elvis Crespo' went on to dominate the charts and became Blanko's first number #1 Latin Billboard chart topper in November 2012.

In 2013 Fito Shared the stage with 'Elvis Crespo' performing the #1 Tropical Billboard hit 'Pegaito Suavecito' during Premios Lo Nuestro 25th Anniversary wards ceremony. During the week of the 2013 Billboard awards, Fito Blanko had 4 songs charting in the top 40 simultaneously, and became the 1st Canadian Latino Artist to achieve these chart positions. 'Mi Princesa', 'Esta Fiesta Remix', 'Pegaito Suavecito', 'Si Te Agarro' all appeared in various Billboard Charts at the same time. In July of the same year, Fito was nominated for the 'Cancion del verano' (song of the summer) category at Premios Juventud where he performed live with DJ Chino and Papayo their hit single 'Si Te Agarro'. Adding to the list of nominations, Fito & Elvis Crespo were nominated for their 'HIT' in the 'Best Party Song' ( Cancion Comienza Fiestas) at the Premios Tu Mundo in August 2013 making Fito a leading voice in Tropical Music. Blanko was nominated for 'Best Urban Performance' at the 14th annual edition of the Latin Grammy awards and was awarded platinum status for 'Pegaito Suavecito' by the U.S RIAA. Fito was also recognized with a BMI Award of Excellence in 2014 from the most airplay in the U.S & Puerto Rico.

In 2015, Blanko was featured on the original motion picture soundtrack for the Furious 7 ( Previously known as Fast & Furious). The Grammy- Nominated artist's "Meneo" is heard during the movie and appears courtesy of Mr305Inc on the 16-track Soundtrack LP by Atlantic Records. The album went #1 on the Billboard 200 and the movie also went on top the box office charts setting a world record for the fastest movie to reach 1 billion dollars in sales. Blanko was named Cultural Ambassador/Spokes person of the Toronto 2015 Pan Am games. The Pan Am games provided the perfect platform for the young artist to step up as a community leader and give back. His Pan Am games inspired theme song 'Come Alive' was featured during the live broadcast of the opening/ closing ceremonies which also included performances by Pitbull and Kanye West. The Grammy nominated artist was recognized with the prestigious #1 Song Award by the 'Society Of Composers Authors Music Publishers Canada' (SOCAN) that same summer and later inducted in Mississaugas 'CANADIAN MUSIC WALK OF FAME' (Class of 2017).

Fito Participated in the official Swiss FIFA RUSSIA 2018 Anthem 'OLE OLE' with DJ Antoine. The song was heard in all tournament stadiums and broadcast worldwide during all Swiss games garnering millions of streams online. Blanko kicked off 2019 with two Top10 Billboard productions. 'La Gringa' with 'Bright Lights' peaked #6 in the U.S Billboard dance charts and cracked the Billboard Hot Electronic Top20 charts becoming Blanko's first entry in the U.S American charts. Fitos second entry in the charts that year came as the co producer/songwriter of "Ella Me Beso" by Elvis Crespo. The song went on to crack the Top10 peaking at #4 in the Tropical Billboard Charts. The Latin stars international appeal and sound was sought after by the Czech artist and Eurovision superstar Mikolas Josef the same year. They collaborated in the European Hit 'Accapella' Produced by Canadian music veteran Jenson Vaughn. The song took the #1 iTunes spot in Czech Republic, Poland and Germany and has over 25 YouTube views to date. 2020 saw the resurgence of 'Meneo' regaining popularity via TikTok & Instagram Music. The song accumulated over 500,000 streams in April 2020 alone and peaked #3 In the Japanese iTunes/Shazam charts.

Blankos Production/Remixing credits include: Pitbull, Gente De Zona, Rick Ross, J Balvin, Enrique Iglessias, Shakira, Fat Joe, Chris Brown, Sergio George, Beenie Man and Juan Magan {{citation needed}}.

== Awards and nominations ==
Awards, nomination and highlights for Fito Blanko
Year	Award	Category	Nominated Work	Result
2005	People's Magazine	New Latin Sensation	Fito Blanko	Recognition
2005	The Latin Industry Award	Best Artist	Fito Blanko	Awarded
2005	Canadian Urban Music	Global Rhythms, International Recording Artist	Fito Blanko	Awarded
2007	The Annual Socca Awards	Carnival Chutney Monarch of The Year	Fito Blanko	Awarded
2011	Billboard Debut	Latin Rhythms, Tropical, Latin Pop	VIP	Awarded
2011	Billboard Top 10	Latin Rhythm	VIP	Awarded
2012	Toronto Star Front Page	Artists to Watch 2012	Fito Blanko	Recognition
2012	#1 Billboard	Tropical Airplay	Pegaito Suavecito	Awarded
2013	Premios Lo Nuestro	Best Tropical Song	Pegaito Suavecito	Nominated/ Performer
2013	Premios Juventud (Latin Teenage Choice Awards)	Cancion Del Verano (Song of the Summer)	"Si Te Agarro" (credited to DJ Chino feat. Fito Blanko, Papayo)	Nominated
2013	Premios Tu Mundo (Latin World Awards)	Cancion Comienzas Fiestas (Best Party Starter Song)	"Pegadito Suavecito" (credited to Elvis Crespo & Fito Blanko)	Nominated
2013	Canadian Urban Music Conference	One To Watch Artisrt of The Year	Fito Blanko	Awarded
2013	Billboard Top 40	4 Songs in Top 40 Simultaneously	Fito Blanko	Awarded
2013	Latin Grammy	Best Urban Performance	Pegaito Suavecito	Nominated
2013	Latin Grammy	Presenter		Presenter
2014	BMI	PREMIO BMI EXCELENCE	Pegaito Suaveceito	Awarded
2014	Billboard Article	4 Artists to Watch	Fito Blanko	Recognition
2014	Latino Magazine	Front Cover	Fito Blanko	Recognition
2015	Furious 7 Soundtrack	#1 Box Office Records ($1 Billion)	Meneo	Awarded
2015	Billboard 200	#1 Billboard Hot 200	Meneo	Awarded
2015	Socan	Socan #1 Award	Meneo	Awarded
2015	RIAA	RIAA PLATINO	Pegaito Suaveceito	Awarded
2015	2015 Pan AM Games	Ambassador	Fito Blanko	Recognition
2016	RIAA	RIAA Platinum	Meneo - Furious 7 Soundtrack	Awarded
2017	Canadian Music Walk of Fame	Inductee 2017 - Star	Fito Blanko	Awarded
2018	Russia 2018 FIFA world Cup	Switzerland Official Song	"Ole Ole" Ft. DJ Antonie	
2018	Direct Co Op Award	The David Award	Fito Blanko	Awarded
2019	Billboard Top 10	Dance Club Charts & Hot Electronic (Top 20)	Gringa	Awarded
2019	Billboard Top 10	Tropical Airplay	Ella Me Beso	Awarded
2019	#1 iTunes Charts	#1 ItUnes Charts Czech Republic	Acapella	
2019	GOLD / PLATINUM CERTIFICATIONS	Gold & Platinum in Japan, UK, Australia	Meneo Furious 7 Soundtrack	Recognition
2020	#3 iTunes Charts	#3 iTunes Charts in Japan	Meneo	Recognition

== Discography ==
=== Albums ===
Title	Details
Higher Level	Released: September 14, 2004; Label: Universal Music Latino; Formats: Digital download, CD
First Class	2009
Paraiso Nocturno	2015
Furious 7 "Meneo"	2015
Party People	2018

=== Singles ===
Year	Title	Album
2004	"By My Side" (featuring Bliz)	Higher Level
2004	"Me Voy A Marchar"	Higher Level
2004	"Sobeteo"	Higher Level
2004	"Fronteo" (featuring Trivales)	Higher Level
2004	"Take Her Home"	Higher Level
2006	"Cambia El Juego / Change The Game" (featuring Tef)	Non-album singles
2006	"Watch You Flex" (featuring Rochester aka Juice)	Non-album singles
2006	"Fuego" (featuring Bishop Brigante)	Non-album singles
2006	"Boom Boom"	Non-album singles
2006	"Dos Salidas De Emergencia Sensei" (Remix)	Non-album singles
2006	"Sexy Love" (Remix)	Non-album singles
2007	"Caile Sensei" (Remix) (featuring Rochester aka Juice)	Non-album singles
2007	"Pretty Gurl" (featuring D'Hitman)	Non-album singles
2007	"No Te Quiere" (Remix)	Non-album singles
2009	"Mambo" (featuring Drake)	Non-album singles
2009	"Superstar Parang D Big Rich Pelau" (featuring Various Trinidad Artists)	Non-album singles
2010	"Dip Low"	Non-album singles
2010	"Whine On You" (featuring Omari Ferrari)	Non-album singles
2010	"Tu Amiga Esta Mejor" (featuring Mr.Saik)	Non-album singles
2011	"VIP" (featuring Fuego)	Non-album singles
2025	"Miami" (with Shawn Desman and Aiona Santana)	Non-album singles

=== Featured artist ===
Year	Title	Album
2018	"Ole Ole" (DJ Antoine featuring Karl Wolf and Fito Blanko)	Non-album singles
2019	"Yes" (Karl Wolf featuring Super Sako, Deena and Fito Blanko)	Non-album singles
2019	"Acapella" (Mikolas Josef featuring Fito Blanko and Frankie J)	Non-album singles
