= Faith, Hope y Amor =

Studio album by Frankie J
- Released: May 28, 2013
- Recorded: 2011–2013
- Genre: Latin pop
- Label: Universal Music Latino

Frankie J chronology
Courage (2011)	Faith, Hope y Amor (2013)	Eleven (2017)

Faith, Hope y Amor is the seventh studio album released by Frankie J on May 28, 2013. It was nominated for Best Latin Pop Album at the 56th Annual Grammy Awards.

== Track listing ==
No.	Title	Length
1.	"Tienes Que Creer en Mi"	3:48
2.	"Beautiful (featuring Pitbull)"	3:47
3.	"No Te Quiero Ver Con El"	4:02
4.	"How Would U Like That"	2:56
5.	"Impossible"	3:50
6.	"My Heart's Too Young To Die"	3:25
7.	"Siempre Te Amaré"	3:25
8.	"Regresarás"	3:38
9.	"No Te Olvidarás de Mi"	4:03
10.	"A Nadie Más Que a Ti"	3:20
11.	"Like a Flag"	3:13
