= Mourning Widows =

- Origin: US
- Genres: Hard rock, Alternative rock
- Years active: 1997–2001
- Past members: Nuno Bettencourt; Donovan Bettencourt; Jeff Consi; Rodrigo Leal

Mourning Widows was a musical project led by Extreme guitarist Nuno Bettencourt. The band was formed in 1997, and they released two albums during their career. Despite not being widely released in the United States, both albums were successful in Japan. Bettencourt formed the band after the moderate success of his 1996 solo album, Schizophonic. The band's sound went back to a funkier guitar-driven rock reminiscent of Extreme, while still having post-grunge and alternative influences. After the end of the Furnished Souls For Rent tour, in 2001, Nuno decided to dismiss the band and released a record as Population 1, mostly recorded by himself. That became the name of his new band too, which would later become DramaGods.

== Discography ==
- Mourning Widows (1998)
- Furnished Souls for Rent (2000)

== Band members ==
- Nuno Bettencourt - guitars, vocals, producer, drums on first record (credited as "Billy Vegas")
- Donovan Bettencourt - bass
- Rodrigo Leal - drums from the first record tour onwards till the end of the band.
- Jeff Consi - drums, played at least one show in London previously to the first record. Jeff was supposed to be the full-time drummer but decided to leave before recording to pursue other projects. It may be a controversy whether he should be considered a member of the band, since when he played Bettencourt still had not named the band.
