= Hole Hearted =

1991 single by Extreme

- European 7-inch sleeve

Single by Extreme

from the album Pornograffitti
- B-side: "Suzi (Wants Her All Day What?)"
- Released: September 15, 1991
- Genre: Pop rock
- Length: 3:39
- Label: A&M
- Songwriters: Nuno Bettencourt, Gary Cherone
- Producer: Nuno Bettencourt

Extreme singles chronology
"More Than Words" (1991)	"Hole Hearted" (1991)	"Rest in Peace" (1992)

Music video
- "Hole Hearted" on YouTube

"Hole Hearted" is a song by American rock group Extreme, released in September 1991 by A&M Records as the fourth and final single and closing track from their successful second album, Pornograffitti (1990). It reached No. 4 on the US Billboard Hot 100 and also charted at No. 12 on the UK Singles Chart and No. 2 in Canada. The song ends with the sound of a thunderstorm, which closes Pornograffiti, similar to how "Decadence Dance" (the lead single and opening track on Pornograffiti) begins with the same sounds and starts the album.

Although the song's chart position was lower compared to the band's previous hit, "More Than Words", it remains their second-highest charting song overall. Like "More Than Words", the style of this song is different from the majority of its parent album. The song's videoclip was shot outside the Boston Centre for the Arts at 551 Tremont Street in Boston (street number seen on many of the pans around the band). The song is excluded from some editions of the vinyl LP version of the album.

== Content ==
Guitarist Nuno Bettencourt said the album Pornograffiti was nearly done when he finally received a 12-string guitar he had ordered. He opened the guitar case and spontaneously started playing the eventual opening chords to "Hole Hearted" on the guitar. He was so excited that he needed to use the bathroom, where he came up with most of the song on the toilet. He said, "That song was written fast, and I remember coming out of the bathroom, saying, 'I've got this really cool tune,' and everybody looked at me kind of weird. I was listening to Led Zeppelin III at the time a lot, and there was a lot of acoustic stuff on there. So I kind of took the groove a little bit, borrowed that feel from being inspired by the Zep III album."

== Track listings ==
- Single
1. "Hole Hearted" – 3:39
2. "More Than Words" (a cappella with congas) – 5:34
3. "Suzi (Wants Her All Day What?)" – 3:38
- EP
1. "Hole Hearted" – 3:40
2. "Get the Funk Out" (12-inch remix) – 7:00
3. "Suzi (Wants Her All Day What?)" – 3:33
4. "Sex N' Love" – 2:47

== Charts ==
=== Weekly charts ===
Chart (1991–1992)	Peak position
Australia (ARIA)	24
Belgium (Ultratop 50 Flanders)	44
Canada Top Singles (RPM)	2
Europe (Eurochart Hot 100)	32
Europe (European Hit Radio)	8
Finland (Suomen virallinen lista)	23
Germany (GfK)	48
Ireland (IRMA)	9
Luxembourg (Radio Luxembourg)	8
Netherlands (Dutch Top 40)	12
Netherlands (Single Top 100)	9
New Zealand (Recorded Music NZ)	8
Sweden (Sverigetopplistan)	30
UK Singles (Official Charts)	12
UK Airplay (Music Week)	2
US Billboard Hot 100	4
US Adult Contemporary (Billboard)	32
US Album Rock Tracks (Billboard)	2
US Cash Box Top 100	4

=== Year-end charts ===
Chart (1991)	Position
Canada Top Singles (RPM)	12
Netherlands (Dutch Top 40)	77
US Billboard Hot 100	46
US Album Rock Tracks (Billboard)	7
US Cash Box Top 100	36

== Release history ==
Region	Date	Format(s)	Label(s)	Ref.
United States	September 15, 1991	Cassette	A&M	
Australia	September 16, 1991	CD; cassette	A&M	
United Kingdom	November 11, 1991	7-inch vinyl; 12-inch vinyl; CD; cassette	A&M	
