= Higher Level =

Studio album by Fito Blanko
- Released: September 14, 2004
- Recorded: 2003–2004
- Genre: Reggaeton
- Label: Universal Music Latino
- Producer: Sensei

Professional ratings
Review scores
Source	Rating
Allmusic	link

Higher Level is the debut album by reggaeton singer Fito Blanko, released in 2004. The album is entirely produced by Peruvian-Canadian producer Sensei, and it features the singles "Me Voy a Marchar", "By My Side" and "Take Her Home". The latter two were released in conjunction with Ivy Queen's two singles "Quiero Saber" and "Papi Te Quiero" as a double release on Universal Music Latino.

== Track listing ==
1. "Sobeteo" - 3:17
2. "Ya Llego" - 3:59
3. "Vultron/...45" - 7:25
4. "Dame Mas Plena" - 2:02
5. "Gruvea" - 3:55
6. "Fronteo" - 3:33
7. "Take Her Home" - 3:50
8. "By My Side" - 3:44
9. "Todo de Mi" - 3:10
10. "Puñal de Amor" - 3:33
11. "Me Voy a Marchar" - 4:37
12. "Quiero Amanecer" - 3:31
13. "En Callao" - 3:32
14. "Ten Fe" - 3:33
15. "Dime Porque" - 3:46
