= Marissa Mishelle =

American former singer (born 1989)

- Born: Marissa Leigh Dubowy; October 9, 1989 (age 37); Phoenix, Arizona
- Origin: Scottsdale, Arizona, United States
- Genres: Pop, rock
- Occupation: Singer
- Instrument: Vocals
- Years active: 2006–2011
- Website: Marissa Mishelle Music

Marissa Mishelle (born Marissa Leigh Dubowy on October 9, 1989 in Phoenix, Arizona) is an American singer. She has appeared on MTV's My Super Sweet 16 and My Super Sweet 16 Presents Exiled. She was the lead singer for the band Defy Tomorrow but left to become a solo artist. She has performed on the 2008 Vans Warped Tour and Edge Fest.

== My Super Sweet 16 ==
Marissa Mishelle's episode appeared as the season opener for the show's third season. The theme for her party was "Pretty in Pink" and was located in a mansion on Camelback Mountain in Phoenix, Arizona. The musical performer was Frankie J. As gifts, Marissa received two different cars, including a Mitsubishi Eclipse spyder convertible.

== Exiled ==
Marissa Mishelle appeared on the first season of My Super Sweet 16 Presents: Exiled. In her episode, Marissa was sent to Kerala, India, where she lived in a chicken coup and helped an Indian family by cleaning up cow dung.

== Singing career ==
Mishelle has been singing since the age of 5. Her single, "Just So Able", was played in a regular rotation on MTV and MTV Overdrive, and also was voted the #1 hit single on VH1's Music Nation. In 2007, she became the lead vocalist for the band Defy Tomorrow and co-wrote the songs on their EP "One Through The Heart." After the band split up in 2008, Marissa Mishelle became a solo artist again and found music manager and developer Daniel Mirharooni, who soon got her signed to indie label SME Group. Marissa parted with SME later that year. On August 29, 2010 Marissa joined the band Minus Ned, an up-and-coming band out of Woodbridge, Connecticut, currently based in Los Angeles, California, that blends rock, blues, jazz and funk with an appealing collection of vocals and well-written lyrics. The band's single "III" was the first to feature Marissa on Lead Vocals. She is a featured vocalist on the band's album "Are We Finally Fitting In", released October 2011.
