= Mikolas Josef =

Czech singer-songwriter (born 1995)

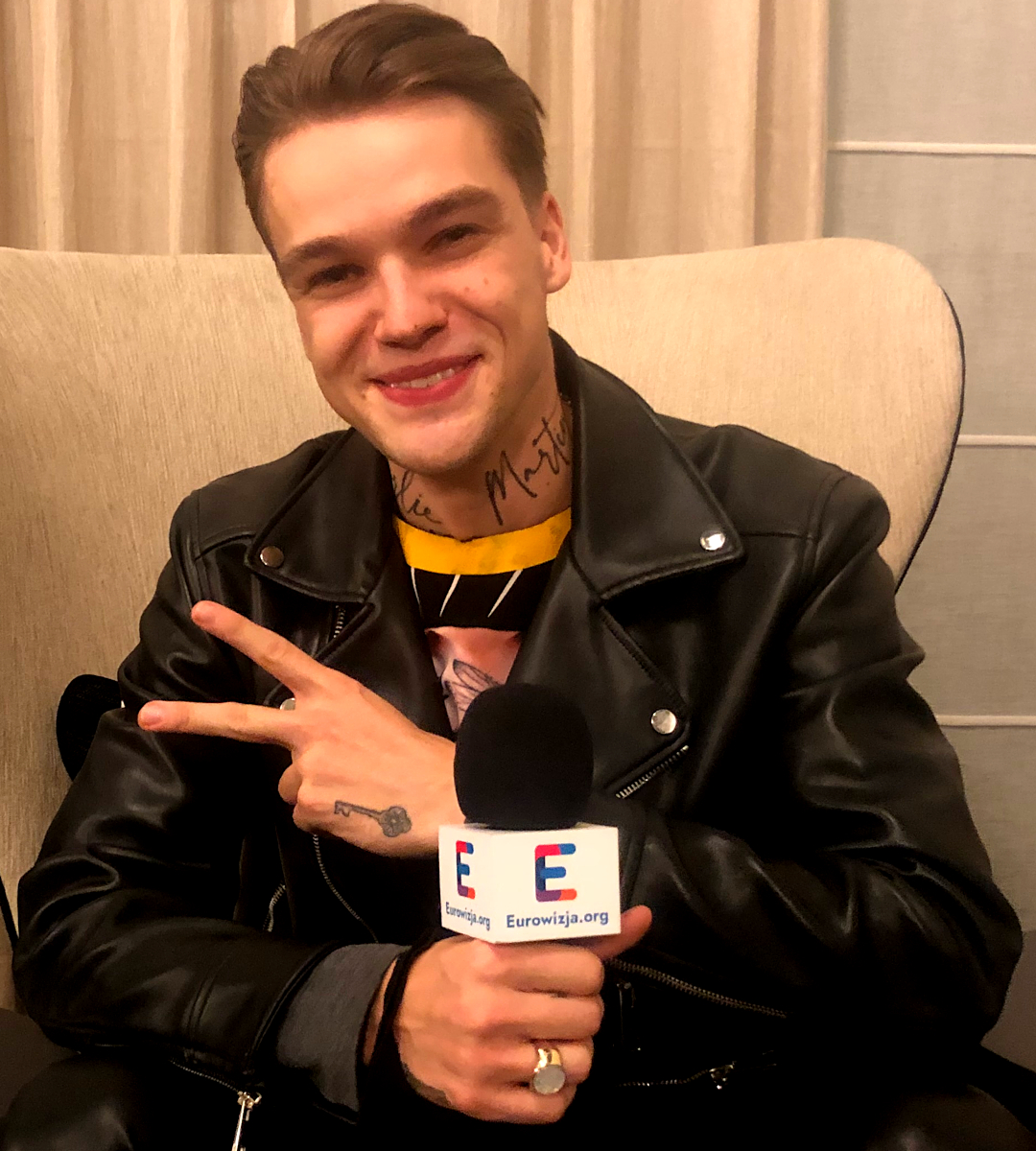
- Josef in 2020
- Born: Mikoláš Josef; 4 October 1995 (age 30); Prague, Czech Republic
- Education: London Academy of Music and Dramatic Art
- Occupations: Singer; songwriter
- Years active: 2013–present
- Musical career
- Genres: Pop; house; folk; hip hop; R&B; pop rock
- Instruments: Vocals; guitar
- Website: www.mikolas.com

Mikolas Josef (Czech: Mikoláš Josef; Czech pronunciation: [ˈmɪkolas ˈjozɛf]; born 4 October 1995), also known mononymously as Mikolas (stylised in all caps), is a Czech singer-songwriter and former model. He represented the Czech Republic in the Eurovision Song Contest 2018 with the song "Lie to Me" and finished in sixth place. This was the highest score for the Czech Republic in Eurovision history.

== Early life and career ==
Josef was born on 4 October 1995 in Prague into a musical family. He is of Czech, Moravian, Austrian, German and Italian descent. He has a brother named Karel and an older half-sister called Martina. He has been playing guitar since he was five years old. He grew up in Znojmo and in a small village in south Bohemia.

Between 2006 and 2008 he studied at an art school, majoring in playing the guitar, which he was not able to finish. He continued his studies at a grammar school where he received an E in a music class.

In 2015 he graduated from the English College in Prague. At the age of 17, he was awarded a gold medal for solo acting by the London Academy of Music and Dramatic Arts. While studying, he was involved in many fashion shows and photoshoots for major brands, including Diesel, Replay or Prada. However, he later left modeling as he did not agree with its industry practices.

After his modelling experience he made a living by busking in large European cities, such as Prague, Oslo, Zurich, Hamburg, and Vienna. During this period, he was also cleaning a recording studio during the week – so that he could produce his own music there once a month whenever it was empty.

== Music career ==
=== 2015–2018: Beginnings and Eurovision Song Contest ===
Josef decided to pursue music professionally. He independently released his debut single "Hands Bloody" in 2015. The following year, he released the single "Free", which became a top 15 hit in the Czech Republic. That same year, he also released the single "Believe (Hey Hey)". After this, he moved to Vienna following an invitation by Nikodem Milewski.

Josef was approached to represent the Czech Republic in the Eurovision Song Contest 2017 with the song "My Turn", but rejected the offer as he did not believe the song suited him. In November 2017, Josef released the single "Lie to Me", and later confirmed that the song would be competing in the Czech national final for the Eurovision Song Contest 2018 in Lisbon. "Lie to Me" later won the national selection, and represented the Czech Republic in the 2018 contest. It finished in sixth place with 66 points from the juries and 215 points from the audience, giving the Czech Republic its best result so far in the competition. In May 2020, "Lie to Me" reached 30 million streams on Spotify, becoming the most-streamed Czech song on the platform.

=== 2018–present: Post-Eurovision projects ===
In April 2018, in Munich, Josef signed an international deal with Sony Music and RCA Records. In October 2018, he released the single "Me Gusta". He later appeared in the selection of "18 inspiring people of 2018" for Forbes. "Abu Dhabi", released in February 2019, was his final release for Sony Music. He was featured in an advertisement campaign for Tezenis underwear and Huawei in the same month. In April 2019, Josef performed his first headlining show, My Name Is Mikolas, in a sold-out Forum Karlin in Prague, where alongside his released songs, he performed a range of unreleased singles accompanied by six African vocalists.

Josef and his family later established their own independent record label, Vivienne Records. "Acapella", released in May 2019, was his first release under this label, which achieved success in Czech Republic (his first chart-topper in the country) and in Poland, where it was certified gold in February 2021. In November 2019, he released "Colorado". In December 2019, he embarked on his Closer to You Tour in the Czech Republic. In October 2020, he released "Lalalalalalalalalala". In March 2023, he released "Boys Don't Cry".

In 2024, Josef announced his first studio album, "One", would be released on 22 March 2024. His second studio album, "Two", was released on October of the following year.

== Discography ==
=== Singles ===
| Title | Year | Peak chart positions | | | | | | | | | Certifications |
| Title | Year | CZE | CZE (Dig.) | AUT | FRA | GER | POL | SCO | SPA | SWE | Certifications |
|---|---|---|---|---|---|---|---|---|---|---|---|
| "Hands Bloody" | 2015 | — | — | — | — | — | — | — | — | — | |
| "Free" | 2016 | 15 | — | — | — | — | — | — | — | — | |
| "Believe (Hey Hey)" | 2016 | — | — | — | — | — | — | — | — | — | |
| "Lie to Me" | 2017 | 52 | 2 | 9 | 122 | 29 | — | 56 | 39 | 21 | |
| "Me Gusta" | 2018 | 7 | 10 | — | — | — | — | — | — | — | |
| "Abu Dhabi" | 2019 | — | 22 | — | — | — | — | — | — | — | |
| "Acapella" (featuring Fito Blanko and Frankie J) | 2019 | 1 | 20 | — | — | — | 2 | — | — | — | ZPAV: Gold |
| "Colorado" | 2019 | 46 | 64 | — | — | — | 5 | — | — | — | |
| "Lalalalalalalalalala" | 2020 | 18 | 29 | — | — | — | 21 | — | — | — | |
| "Boys Don't Cry" | 2023 | 98 | 55 | — | — | — | — | — | — | — | |
| "Delilah" (with Mark Neve) | 2023 | — | 10 | — | — | — | 30 | — | — | — | |
| "Never Get Over You" | 2023 | 78 | — | — | — | — | — | — | — | — | |
| "Diamonds" | 2024 | — | — | — | — | — | — | — | — | — | |
| "Samba" | 2025 | — | 45 | — | — | — | — | — | — | — | |
| "Ferrari" | 2025 | — | — | — | — | — | 34 | — | — | — | |
| "Icon" | 2025 | — | — | — | — | — | — | — | — | — | |
| "Hard to Be Humble" (with Tribbs) | 2026 | — | — | — | — | — | 38 | — | — | — | |
"—" denotes a single that did not chart or was not released.

=== Other songs ===
| Title | Year | Album |
|---|---|---|
| "Used to This" (Lukas Rieger featuring Mikolas Josef) | 2019 | Justice |

== Tours ==
- Closer to You (2019)

Awards and achievements
| Preceded by Martina Bárta with "My Turn" | Czech Republic in the Eurovision Song Contest; 2018 | Succeeded by Lake Malawi with "Friend of a Friend" |
