= Extreme II: Pornograffitti =

Studio album by Extreme
- Released: August 7, 1990
- Studios: Scream Studios, (Studio City, California); Courtlen Recording (Hanson, Massachusetts)
- Genres: Glam metal; funk metal; heavy metal
- Length: 64:30
- Label: A&M
- Producers: Michael Wagener; Nuno Bettencourt

Extreme chronology
Extreme (1989)	Extreme II: Pornograffitti (1990)	III Sides to Every Story (1992)

Singles from Pornograffitti
- 1. "Decadence Dance" Released: 1990; 2. "Get the Funk Out" Released: 1991; 3. "More Than Words" Released: March 23, 1991; 4. "Hole Hearted" Released: September 15, 1991; 5. "Song For Love" Released: 1992

Professional ratings
Review scores
Source	Rating
AllMusic	4/5 stars
Collector's Guide to Heavy Metal	9/10
The Daily Vault	B−

Extreme II: Pornograffitti (also known as simply Pornograffitti) is the second studio album by the heavy metal band Extreme, released on August 7, 1990, through A&M Records. The album title is a portmanteau of pornography and graffiti.

Extreme II sold very well, peaking at No. 10 on the Billboard 200, and was certified double platinum in the U.S. by the RIAA. It is the band's best selling album. Two singles from Pornograffitti, "More Than Words" and "Hole Hearted", reached No. 1 and 4 respectively on the Billboard Hot 100. Two other tracks, "Decadence Dance" and "Get the Funk Out", became popular on MTV's Headbangers Ball.

== Overview ==
Pornograffitti is a concept album, its story is about lost innocence and uneasiness. Though the album "[focuses] on the same funk-metal vibe as [their debut]", it became massively popular due to the acoustic single "More Than Words".

According to authors HP Newquist and Pete Prown, the album has "a bewildering array of song styles—heavy metal, ballads, funk, etc.".

The title track, as well as "More than Words" and "It('s a Monster)", have been played live since at least early April 1989, and date back to shortly after the band's self-titled debut was released.

== Reception ==
The album received largely positive reception. AllMusic reviewer Steve Huey gave the album four stars, and commented that "[the] band shows a strong desire to experiment and push the boundaries of the pop-metal format". Rolling Stone placed the album at thirteenth on their list of the "50 Greatest Hair Metal Albums of All Time". Ultimate Classic Rock ranked it at eighth in their "Top 30 Glam Metal Albums". Heavy metal author Martin Popoff, in his book The Big Book of Hair Metal, called the album, "a thinking man's hair metal album, with thoughtful lyrics and tasteful guitar work".

Lead guitarist Nuno Bettencourt garnered admiration from rock guitar enthusiasts, as he was voted "Best New Talent" in a 1991 readers' poll by Guitar World magazine, and that magazine later named him "Most Valuable Player" of 1991.

== Legacy ==
In 2010, after the band's reunion in the previous years, rumors started about possible commemorative shows given the 20th anniversary of the record. In 2012, the band played the entire album for four tour dates in Japan. In January 2014, the band confirmed they would be performing Pornograffitti in its entirety on their 2014 European tour.

In 2015, the band embarked on an extensive US tour commemorating the album's 25th anniversary.

The Japanese rock band Porno Graffitti got its name from the album.

== Track listing ==
All tracks are written by Gary Cherone and Nuno Bettencourt.

No.	Title	Length
1.	"Decadence Dance"	6:49
2.	"Li'l Jack Horny"	4:51
3.	"When I'm President"	4:21
4.	"Get the Funk Out"	4:24
5.	"More Than Words"	5:34
6.	"Money (In God We Trust)"	4:11
7.	"It ('s a Monster)"	4:24
8.	"Pornograffitti"	6:15
9.	"When I First Kissed You"	4:00
10.	"Suzi (Wants Her All Day What?)"	3:38
11.	"He-Man Woman Hater" (includes intro "Flight of the Wounded Bumble Bee")	6:20
12.	"Song for Love"	5:55
13.	"Hole Hearted" (does not appear on some editions of the vinyl LP)	3:39
Total length:		64:21

2015 Deluxe Edition: Disc Two
No.	Title	Origin	Length
1.	"More Than Words" (remix)	"More Than Words" CD single	3:43
2.	"Nice Place To Visit"	"More Than Words" CD single	3:16
3.	"More Than Words" (edit)		3:41
4.	"Decadence Dance" (edit)	"Decadence Dance" single	4:31
5.	"Money (in God We Trust)" (edit)		4:05
6.	"More Than Words" (non-percussion version)		4:20
7.	"Get the Funk Out" (What the Funk? mix)		4:04
8.	"More Than Words" (a cappella with congas)	"Hole Hearted" single	4:15
9.	"Get the Funk Out" (12-inch remix)	"Hole Hearted" single	7:01
10.	"Sex N' Love"	"Hole Hearted" single	2:47

== Personnel ==
Extreme

- Gary Cherone – lead and backing vocals
- Nuno Bettencourt – guitars, keyboards, piano, percussion, backing vocals, arrangements, producer on tracks 9 and 13
- Pat Badger – bass, backing vocals
- Paul Geary – drums, percussion, backing vocals

Additional musicians

- Barbara Glynn – backing vocals on "Decadence Dance"
- Pat Travers – backing vocals on "Get the Funk Out"
- Jeanine Moultrine – backing vocals on "Suzi (Wants Her All Day What?)"
- Dweezil Zappa – intro/outro lead guitar on "He-Man Woman Hater" (after "Flight of the Wounded Bumble Bee")
- Li'l Jack Horn Section in "Li'l Jack Horny", "Get the Funk Out" directed by Andy Armer
  - Bob Findley, trumpet
  - Chuck Findley, trumpet
  - Bill Watrous, trombone
  - Dick "Slyde" Hyde, bass trombone
  - Pete Christlieb, tenor sax
  - Joel Peskin, tenor sax

Production

- Michael Wagener – producer, mixing
- Bob St. John – engineer
- George Marino – mastering at Sterling Sound, New York
- Randy Badazz – orchestration
- Ioannis/Third Image – art direction and design

== Charts ==
=== Weekly charts ===
Chart (1990–91)	Peak position
Australian Albums (ARIA)	29
Austrian Albums (Ö3 Austria)	17
Canada Top Albums/CDs (RPM)	1
Dutch Albums (Album Top 100)	16
Finnish Albums (The Official Finnish Charts)	11
German Albums (Offizielle Top 100)	15
Japanese Albums (Oricon)	32
New Zealand Albums (RMNZ)	32
Norwegian Albums (VG-lista)	20
Swedish Albums (Sverigetopplistan)	37
Swiss Albums (Schweizer Hitparade)	10
UK Albums (Official Charts)	12
US Billboard 200	10

=== Year-end charts ===
Chart (1991)	Position
European Albums (European Top 100)	69
US Billboard 200	23

== Certifications ==
Region	Certification	Certified units/sales
Australia (ARIA)	Gold	35,000^{^}
Canada (Music Canada)	3× Platinum	300,000^{^}
Netherlands (NVPI)	Gold	50,000^{^}
New Zealand (RMNZ)	Gold	7,500^{‡}
United Kingdom (BPI)	Platinum	300,000^{^}
United States (RIAA)	2× Platinum	2,000,000^{^}
^{^} Shipments figures based on certification alone.^{‡} Sales+streaming figures based on certification alone.
