= Me Gusta (Mikolas Josef song) =

Single by Mikolas Josef
- Released: 5 October 2018
- Recorded: 2018
- Genre: Pop
- Length: 2:51
- Label: Sony Music Entertainment
- Songwriter(s): Mikolas Josef; Sebastian Arman; Joacim Persson

Mikolas Josef singles chronology
"Lie to Me" (2017)	"Me Gusta" (2018)	"Abu Dhabi" (2019)

"Me Gusta" is a song by Czech singer Mikolas Josef. It was released as a Digital download on 5 October 2018 through Sony Music Entertainment.

== Music video ==
A music video to accompany the release of "Me Gusta" was first released onto YouTube on 4 October 2018 at a total length of two minutes and fifty-six seconds.

== Track listing ==
Digital download
No.	Title	Length
1.	"Me Gusta"	2:51

== Charts ==
Chart (2018)	Peak position
Czech Republic (Rádio – Top 100)	7
Czech Republic (Singles Digitál Top 100)	10

== Release history ==
Region	Date	Format	Label
Czech Republic	5 October 2018	Digital download	Sony Music Entertainment
