= Lie to Me (Mikolas Josef song) =

2017 single by Mikolas Josef

Single by Mikolas Josef
- Released: 19 November 2017
- Genre: Dance-pop; Electro swing; Funktronica; Pop-rap; Contemporary R&B
- Length: 2:50
- Label: Sony Music Entertainment Germany GmbH
- Songwriter: Mikolas Josef
- Producer: Mikolas Josef

Mikolas Josef singles chronology
"Believe (Hey Hey)" (2016)	"Lie to Me" (2017)	"Me Gusta" (2018)

Music video
- "Lie to Me" on YouTube

Eurovision Song Contest 2018 entry
- Country: Czech Republic
- Artist: Mikolas Josef
- Language: English
- Composer: Mikolas Josef
- Lyricist: Mikolas Josef

Finals performance
- Semi-final result: 3rd
- Semi-final points: 232
- Final result: 6th
- Final points: 281

Entry chronology
- ◄ "My Turn" (2017)
- "Friend of a Friend" (2019) ►

"Lie to Me" is a song written and performed by Czech singer Mikolas Josef. The song was independently released as a digital download on 19 November 2017. It represented the Czech Republic in the Eurovision Song Contest 2018, where it qualified for the final, finishing sixth, making it the Czech Republic's best placing in the contest.

== Eurovision Song Contest ==
On 8 January 2018, Josef was announced as one of the six competitors in the Czech national final for the Eurovision Song Contest 2018. Following the close of the voting period, Josef was announced as the winner of the jury vote on 23 January. On 29 January, it was announced that "Lie to Me" had won the national final, and would represent the Czech Republic at the Eurovision Song Contest 2018.

The song competed in the first semi-final, held on 8 May 2018 in Lisbon, Portugal. Subsequently, it became only the second Czech entry to qualify for the grand final, with Josef performing in the second half.

== Track listing ==
Digital download
No.	Title	Length
1.	"Lie to Me"	2:50

== Charts ==
Chart (2018)	Peak position
Austria (Ö3 Austria Top 40)	9
Belgium (Ultratip Bubbling Under Flanders)	34
Czech Republic Airplay (ČNS IFPI)	52
Czech Republic Singles Digital (ČNS IFPI)	2
France (SNEP)	122
Germany (GfK)	29
Greece Digital Singles (IFPI Greece)	17
Portugal (AFP)	82
Scottish Singles Sales (Official Charts)	56
Spain (PROMUSICAE)	39
Sweden (Sverigetopplistan)	21
UK Singles Downloads (Official Charts)	53
UK Indie (Official Charts)	47

== Release history ==
Region	Date	Format	Label
Worldwide	19 November 2017	Digital download	Independent
