= Nuno Bettencourt =

Portuguese-American guitarist (born 1966)

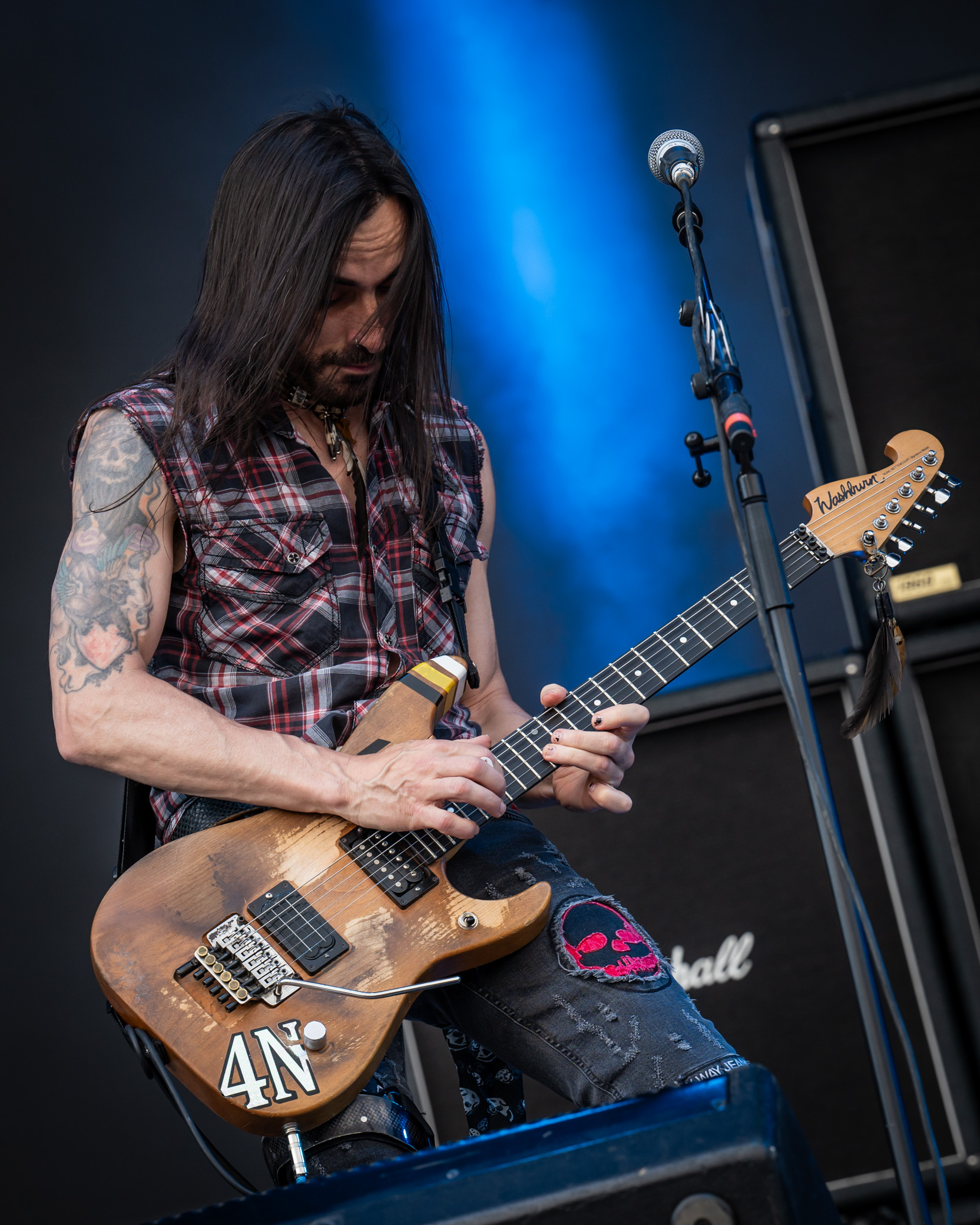
- Bettencourt performing in 2024

Background information
- Born: Nuno Duarte Gil Mendes Bettencourt; September 20, 1966 (age 60); Praia da Vitória, Terceira, Azores, Portugal
- Origin: Hudson, Massachusetts, U.S.
- Genres: Glam metal; hard rock; funk metal; heavy metal; alternative rock
- Occupation: Musician
- Instruments: Guitar
- Years active: 1985–present
- Member of: Extreme
- Formerly of: Mourning Widows; DramaGods; Satellite Party; Generation Axe

Nuno Duarte Gil Mendes Bettencourt (born September 20, 1966) is a Portuguese-American guitarist. He became known as the lead guitarist of the Boston rock band Extreme. Bettencourt has recorded a solo album and has founded rock bands including Mourning Widows, DramaGods, and Satellite Party.

Rolling Stone ranked him no. 197 of the 250 greatest guitarists of all time in 2023.

== Early life ==
Bettencourt was born on September 20, 1966, in Praia da Vitória, Terceira, Azores, Portugal, the youngest of 10 siblings. He is the younger brother of Luis Gil Bettencourt. The family moved to the United States when he was four, and he grew up in Hudson, Massachusetts.

== Career ==
=== Extreme ===
After playing in the Boston-based hair metal act Sinful, Bettencourt rose to fame as a guitarist for the Boston-area group Extreme, which he joined in 1985. The band released its debut record, Extreme, in 1989. The final track on the album, "Play with Me", was used as the "mall chase" song in the film Bill & Ted's Excellent Adventure.

In 1990, Extreme released its next album, Pornograffitti, which included the hits "More Than Words" and "Hole Hearted". The acoustic ballad "More Than Words" entered the Hot 100 on March 23, 1991, at No. 81. It later became a huge smash, hitting No. 1 on the Billboard Hot 100 in the United States. "Hole Hearted" was also successful, rising to No. 4 on the same popular music chart. Pornograffitti garnered admiration for Bettencourt from rock guitar enthusiasts. He was voted "Best New Talent" in a 1991 readers' poll by Guitar World magazine, and that magazine later named him "Most Valuable Player" of 1991. Queen guitarist Brian May has called Bettencourt's solo from the song "Get the Funk Out" "a landmark in rock history that I think should have its own little medal struck and awarded to Nuno Bettencourt and Extreme."

The band followed up with III Sides to Every Story in 1992. The album featured brass and string sections, as well as a full orchestra, whose parts were composed and arranged by Bettencourt. In 1995, Extreme released the album Waiting for the Punchline, but the band broke up in 1996 when Bettencourt decided to pursue a solo career.

In 2007, Extreme reformed with its original lineup (except for Paul Geary) to begin work on a new album, Saudades de Rock. The album was released on August 12, 2008.

=== Other projects ===
Bettencourt provided rhythm guitar on the single version of Janet Jackson's "Black Cat" (1990) which became a number one hit on the Billboard Hot 100.

In 1991, Bettencourt produced Dweezil Zappa's release on Barking Pumpkin Records, Confessions. On this record Bettencourt also sings lead vocals for the first time, on a semi-ballad entitled "The Kiss". Extreme members Gary Cherone and Pat Badger also contributed.

In 1993, Bettencourt co-wrote and produced "Where Are You Going" for the Super Mario Bros. movie. He also joined Robert Palmer in the studio to record Palmer's album Honey. According to former Journey lead singer Steve Perry, Bettencourt has teamed with him to write and arrange songs. He also has written and recorded with Tantric (Bettencourt co-wrote Tantric's hit single "Hey Now"), BB Mak, and Toni Braxton.

In 1997, Bettencourt released his first solo effort, Schizophonic, which he had been working on for five years. The album was well-received critically but was not a commercial success.

On December 16, 1997, Bettencourt's new band Mourning Widows (whose name was inspired by writing he had seen on a church wall in Portugal) released their self-titled debut album in Japan on Polydor Records. It sold 45,000 in the first month. The band featured his nephew Donovan Bettencourt on bass and New York drummer Jeff Consi. In 2000, Mourning Widows' follow-up, Furnished Souls for Rent, originally released in Japan, and then in the U.S. Both Mourning Widows releases cultivated a strong following in Japan and New England.

Bettencourt has also collaborated with singer Suze DeMarchi and with all of her Baby Animals bandmates. On Baby Animals' second release, Shaved and Dangerous, he produced a few songs and co-wrote "Because I Can". He also contributed to the writing, recording, and production of DeMarchi's 1999 solo debut, Telelove. In 1999, Bettencourt produced the album Magnolia for the Portuguese singer and actress Lúcia Moniz. He also featured as a singer and guitarist in the song "Try Again", which was included in Magnolia.

Bettencourt formed the recording entity Population 1 and released the self-titled and self-produced 2002 release, Population 1, on Universal/Japan and YBM/Korea. In 2004, Population 1 released Sessions from Room Four. Due to legal issues, the band was renamed to Near Death Experience in 2005. The band was then renamed DramaGods. DramaGods released its first album in December 2005 as an import; it was made available as a digital download in 2006. In 2006, DramaGods contributed their song "S'OK" to the album project Artists for Charity—Guitarists 4 the Kids, produced by Slang Productions to assist World Vision Canada in helping children in need.

Bettencourt's playing has been featured in 2004 on the Universal/Japan CD and DVD release of Guitar Wars featuring solo and collective performances of Bettencourt with many others, including Steve Hackett (Genesis, GTR), Led Zeppelin bassist John Paul Jones and Mr. Big/Racer X guitarist Paul Gilbert.

Bettencourt was the lead guitarist for Satellite Party, which is a band formed by Jane's Addiction frontman Perry Farrell. Bettencourt played with the band at the 2005 Lollapalooza festival. Bettencourt helped produce Ultra Payloaded, the debut album by Satellite Party released on May 29, 2007, on Columbia Records. In late July 2007, Bettencourt departed Satellite Party due to concerns about the direction of the band's live show.

In 2008, Bettencourt was featured on the soundtrack for the motion picture Smart People. The soundtrack also features the Gary Cherone track, "Need I Say More", and Baby Animals selections. The following year, Bettencourt was featured in a song and video called "Best Night Ever" by Marshall Eriksen, a character on How I Met Your Mother. The video was a parody of Extreme's "More Than Words" video, in which the entire main cast of How I Met Your Mother appeared.

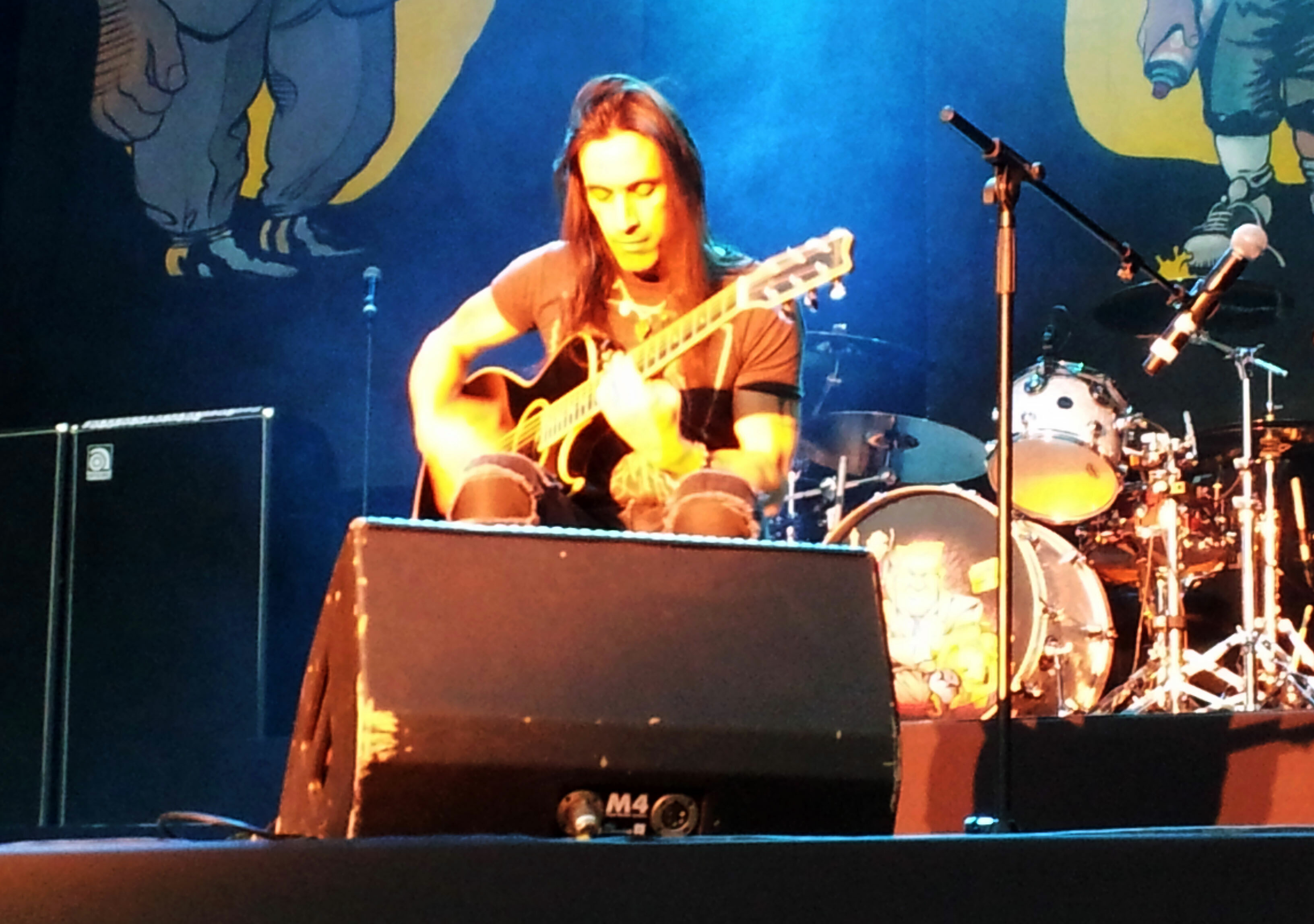
Bettencourt performing in 2015

In November 2009, Bettencourt toured with singer Rihanna on her Last Girl on Earth Tour as lead guitarist, having appeared alongside her in several TV shows and other performances. He has since performed as Rihanna's lead guitarist on subsequent tours, including her Loud (2010), 777 (2012) and Diamonds World (2013) tours. Tim Stewart (lead guitarist for Lady Gaga, and who also played for Suicidal Tendencies) took over for Bettencourt as lead guitarist for Rihanna on her ANTI tour 2016.

In July 2011, Steel Panther reported to Loud magazine that Nuno would be "coming in to do something" on their then-upcoming release Balls Out. The collaboration resulted in the track "It Won't Suck Itself", which also featured Nickelback frontman Chad Kroeger.

In April 2022, Bettencourt joined Julian Lennon on an acoustic cover of Julian's father John Lennon's hit "Imagine" to benefit Global Citizen's Stand Up For Ukraine.

On February 12, 2023, Bettencourt performed at the Super Bowl LVII halftime show as part of Rihanna's backing band.

On July 5, 2025, Bettencourt performed at the Ozzy Osbourne / Black Sabbath tribute show, Back to the Beginning. He performed nine songs with an array of musicians. The performance for "Changes," with Yungblud, Frankie Bello, Adam Wakeman and II from Sleep Token, won a Grammy Award for Best Rock Performance.

== Atlantis Entertainment ==
In 2016, Bettencourt founded media production company Atlantis Entertainment (of which he is CEO) with Rene Rigal and Steven Schuurman.

== Guitars ==
Bettencourt had a long-standing association with Washburn Guitars with which he developed the N-series, including the signature Washburn N4. In 2025 Bettencourt parted ways with Washburn and began his own brand called Nuno Guitars.

== Legacy ==
Prince once called Bettencourt one of the three greatest guitarists of all time. Bettencourt has received similar praise from other figures in the music industry such as Brian May, Steve Vai, Steve Lukather, Tom Morello, Mateus Asato, and Zakk Wylde. Glay guitarist Hisashi and Lovebites guitarist Midori have both cited Bettencourt as one of their biggest influences.

In 2023, Rolling Stone ranked him as the 197th-greatest guitarist of all time.

== Personal life ==
Bettencourt married Australian singer Suze DeMarchi in 1994. They have two children together, actress Bebe Bettencourt (born in 1996) and Lorenzo Aureolino Bettencourt (born in 2002). The couple divorced in 2013.

== Discography ==
with Extreme

- Extreme (1989)
- Extreme II: Pornograffitti (1990)
- III Sides to Every Story: Yours/Mine/The Truth (1992)
- Waiting for the Punchline (1995)
- Saudades de Rock (2008)
- Take Us Alive (2010)
- Six (2023)

as Nuno

- Schizophonic (1997)

with Mourning Widows

- Mourning Widows (1998)
- Furnished Souls for Rent (2000)

with Population 1

- Population 1 (2002)
- Sessions from Room 4 (2004)

with DramaGods

- Love (2005)

with Satellite Party

- Ultra Payloaded (2007)

with Generation Axe

- The Guitars That Destroyed the World: Live in China (2019)

Solo career

- Best of Nuno (2003)
- Smart People (Original Soundtrack) (2008)

as a guest musician

- Janet Jackson's Rhythm Nation 1814 (1989), by Janet Jackson
- Putting Back The Rock (1990), by Jim Gilmore
- Confessions (1991), by Dweezil Zappa
- Guitars Practicing Musicians Vol. 2 (1991), from Red Distribution Records
- Guitars That Rule The World, Vol. 1 (1992), from Metal Blade Records
- Mixin' It Up: The Best of the Dan Reed Network (1993), by Dan Reed Network
- We Are the Majority (1993), by J. (Jaye Muller)
- Come Over Here (2019), by Count Jaye & the Hard Beats (Jaye Muller)
- Shaved and Dangerous (1993), by Baby Animals
- Super Mario Bros. Original Motion Pictures Soundtrack (1993), from Capitol Records
- Kiss My Ass: Classic Kiss Regrooved (1994), from Mercury Records
- Honey (1994), by Robert Palmer
- Telelove (1999), by Suze DeMarchi
- After We Go (2004), by Tantric
- Numbers from the Beast (2005), from Rykodisc Records
- Libra (2005), by Toni Braxton
- GONG (2005), by JAM Project
- Africans in the Snow (2007), by T.M. Stevens
- Music from the Mound (2007), from EMI America Records
- Loud (2010), by Rihanna
- The World As We Love It (2011), by Pushking
- Fastlife (2011), by Joe Jonas
- Balls Out (2011), by Steel Panther
- Talk That Talk (2011), by Rihanna
- "Sold for Free" - Single (2014), by Tama Girard
- Anti (2016), by Rihanna
- Feed the Machine (2017), by Nickelback
- Fender/Youtube Special Edition Game of Thrones collab (2020) with Tom Morello and Brad Paisley
- Vortex (2022), by Derek Sherinian
- "Becoming" - Single (2026), by Billy Morrison and Sully Erna
