= More Than Words =

1991 single by Extreme

Single by Extreme

from the album Extreme II: Pornograffitti
- B-side: "Nice Place to Visit"; "Kid Ego"
- Released: March 12, 1991
- Genre: Soft rock; acoustic rock
- Length: 5:33 (album version); 4:09 (radio edit)
- Label: A&M
- Songwriters: Gary Cherone; Nuno Bettencourt
- Producer: Michael Wagener

Extreme singles chronology
"Get the Funk Out" (1991)	"More Than Words" (1991)	"Hole Hearted" (1991)

Music video
- "More Than Words" on YouTube

"More Than Words" is a song by American rock band Extreme. It is an acoustic rock ballad, featuring guitar work by Nuno Bettencourt and the vocals of Gary Cherone (with harmony vocals from Bettencourt). They both wrote the song, which was produced by Michael Wagener and represented a departure from the band's usual funk metal style.

"More Than Words" was released as the third single from Extreme's second album, Pornograffitti (1990), on March 12, 1991, by A&M Records. In the United States, it topped the Billboard Hot 100 chart and was certified gold by the Recording Industry Association of America (RIAA). It additionally topped the charts of Belgium, Canada, Israel, the Netherlands, and New Zealand, and it entered the top 10 in 10 other countries. The music video for the song was directed by Jonathan Dayton and Valerie Faris.

== Content ==
The song is an acoustic ballad in which the singer wants his lover to do more than simply saying "I love you" to demonstrate her love for him. Bettencourt described it as a warning that the phrase was becoming meaningless: "People use it so easily and so lightly that they think you can say that and fix everything, or you can say that and everything's OK. Sometimes you have to do more and you have to show it—there's other ways to say 'I love you'".

== Release ==
The band fought with their record company to get "More Than Words" released as a single. At one point, Bettencourt even quit the band over the issue. In 2016, Bettencourt told Billboard: "'Our label at the time [A&M Records] didn't want to release "More Than Words" as a single because there was nothing on the radio like that at the time. The label said, "Who's going to play it?" Everybody was doing big power ballads at the time, and this was more like an Everly Brothers or Beatles track. But we fought for it'".

"It became a monster. It took a life of its own and we couldn't kill it. ... I think it'll pass the test of time."

— Gary Cherone talking about the song.

"That song gave us the freedom to make the record we really wanted to make when we started recording our third disc," Cherone told KNAC. "It got us doing huge tours all over the states and around the world... As the nineties went on, however, we really started to resent the song. We were tagged 'the More Than Words guys'. We didn't like the perception the song created about the band. I remember being on tour with Aerosmith in Poland... it was on that tour we decided we would not play the song. We just didn't do it. A couple nights into the tour, Steven Tyler writes in big letters on our dressing room door, 'Play the fucking song!' His attitude was almost father-like. He was like, 'Look, this is your first time in Poland. When do you think you will be back? They want to hear it, so play it!'"

== Critical reception ==
AllMusic editor William Ruhlmann noted that on the song, the band pursued "acoustic balladry". Kira L. Billik from Associated Press described "More Than Words" as a "sweet, pure acoustic ballad", "whose message is that the words 'I love you' are becoming meaningless". The song was also labeled as a "nontraditional love song". Larry Flick from Billboard magazine felt this "tender, sparsely produced rock/love ballad proves that sometimes less really is more. The spotlight here is on the band's striking vocal harmonies, as well as its shimmering acoustic guitar work". The Daily Vault's Sean McCarthy called it a "beautiful, minimal acoustic number [that] made the band huge" and concluded that "for the band, 'More Than Words' is the song that will still get airplay." Diane Cardwell from Entertainment Weekly called it "a simple, almost folkie ballad using just two voices and a single acoustic guitar." Kirsten Frickle from El Paisano described it as an "all-acoustic ballad that is so beautiful it will make your hair stand on end".

Pan-European magazine Music & Media labeled the song as "folky" and "a calming piece of music, aptly produced by Michael Wagener." They added, "It shows the band from a totally different angle. And it must be said, they handle this ballad extremely well." Alan Jones from Music Week named it Pick of the Week, remarking that it is "a subdued, lilting acoustic workout that suggests nothing more than Simon & Garfunkel in its more angelic passages." Carrie Borzillo from Record-Journal called it an "Everly Brothers-style" song. A reviewer from Sandwell Evening Mail wrote, "If ever a song could be unrepresentative of a band's output, Extreme's worldwide smash hit ballad 'More Than Words' is it." Marc Andrews from Smash Hits found it "eye-moistening". Tom Nordlie from Spin viewed it as "a love ballad that sounds like the Everly Brothers or early Beatles." He added, "Singer Gary Cherone harmonizes with himself as guitar-friend Nuno Bettencourt strums clean, jazzy chord accompaniment, and that's it. No sudden escalation to bombast in the middle, no reneging on the song's original promise." Chad Bowar writing for LiveAbout placed the song on his list of the "Best 20 Hair Metal Ballads of the '80s and '90s".

== Chart performance ==
On March 23, 1991, "More Than Words" entered the US Billboard Hot 100 at number 81 and reached number one on June 9. It also reached number two in the United Kingdom and number one in four other countries: Belgium, Canada, Israel, the Netherlands, and New Zealand.

== Music video ==
The song's music video was filmed in black and white and was produced and directed by American film and music video directors Jonathan Dayton and Valerie Faris. It starts with Pat Badger turning off his amplifier and putting down his bass, and Paul Geary putting down his drumsticks. Nuno and Gary are then seen performing the song, while the other band members are shown in front of them, holding up their lighters. In the video's music rendition, the song ends abruptly before Nuno's final solo and coda.

In May 2015, Jack Black and Jimmy Fallon performed the song on an episode of The Tonight Show Starring Jimmy Fallon. The performance is a shot-for-shot remake of the original music video.

== Track listings ==
- CD maxi
1. "More Than Words" — 5:33
2. "Kid Ego" — 4:04
3. "Nice Place to Visit" — 3:16
- 7-inch single
1. "More Than Words" (Remix) — 3:43
2. "Nice Place to Visit" — 3:16

== Charts ==
=== Weekly charts ===
Weekly chart performance for "More Than Words"
Chart (1991)	Peak position
Australia (ARIA)	2
Austria (Ö3 Austria Top 40)	13
Belgium (Ultratop 50 Flanders)	1
Canada Retail Singles (The Record)	1
Canada Top Singles (RPM)	1
Canada Adult Contemporary (RPM)	2
Europe (Eurochart Hot 100)	3
Europe (European Hit Radio)	3
Finland (Suomen virallinen lista)	6
France (SNEP)	8
Germany (GfK)	8
Ireland (IRMA)	2
Israel (Israeli Singles Chart)	1
Luxembourg (Radio Luxembourg)	2
Netherlands (Dutch Top 40)	1
Netherlands (Single Top 100)	1
New Zealand (Recorded Music NZ)	1
Norway (VG-lista)	4
Portugal (AFP)	3
Sweden (Sverigetopplistan)	4
Switzerland (Schweizer Hitparade)	3
UK Singles (Official Charts)	2
UK Airplay (Music Week)	1
US Billboard Hot 100	1
US Adult Contemporary (Billboard)	2
US Album Rock Tracks (Billboard)	12
US Cash Box Top 100	1

=== Year-end charts ===
Year-end chart performance for "More Than Words"
Chart (1991)	Position
Australia (ARIA)	7
Belgium (Ultratop)	13
Canada Top Singles (RPM)	2
Canada Adult Contemporary (RPM)	16
Europe (Eurochart Hot 100)	15
Europe (European Hit Radio)	17
Germany (Media Control)	44
Israel (Israeli Singles Chart)	3
Netherlands (Dutch Top 40)	3
Netherlands (Single Top 100)	3
New Zealand (RIANZ)	7
Sweden (Topplistan)	16
Switzerland (Schweizer Hitparade)	12
UK Singles (OCC)	16
US Billboard Hot 100	7
US Adult Contemporary (Billboard)	18
US Cash Box Top 100	2

=== Decade-end charts ===
Decade-end chart performance for "More Than Words"
Chart (1990–1999)	Position
Canada (Nielsen SoundScan)	68

== Certifications ==
Certifications for "More Than Words"
Region	Certification	Certified units/sales
Australia (ARIA)	Platinum	70,000^{^}
Brazil (Pro-Música Brasil)	Platinum	60,000^{‡}
Canada (Music Canada)	Platinum	100,000^{^}
Denmark (IFPI Danmark)	Gold	45,000^{‡}
Italy (FIMI)	Gold	35,000^{‡}
Netherlands (NVPI)	Gold	75,000^{^}
Spain (Promusicae)	Platinum	60,000^{‡}
Sweden (GLF)	Gold	25,000^{^}
United Kingdom (BPI)	Platinum	600,000^{‡}
United States (RIAA)	Gold	500,000^{^}
^{^} Shipments figures based on certification alone.^{‡} Sales+streaming figures based on certification alone.

== Release history ==
Release dates and formats for "More Than Words"
Region	Date	Format(s)	Label(s)	Ref.
United States	March 12, 1991	Cassette	A&M	
Japan	June 5, 1991	Mini-CD	A&M	
Australia	June 10, 1991	7-inch vinyl; cassette	A&M	
Australia	July 8, 1991	CD	A&M	
United Kingdom	July 15, 1991	7-inch vinyl; 12-inch vinyl; CD; cassette	A&M	
