= Don't Wanna Try =

2003 single by Frankie J

Song by A.B. Quintanilla y Los Kumbia Kings con Frankie J

from the album 4
- Released: February 25, 2003
- Genre: Pop; R&B
- Length: 4:07
- Label: EMI Latin
- Songwriter(s): Francisco Bautista; Jaime Gálvez
- Producer(s): A.B. Quintanilla; Cruz Martínez

"Don't Wanna Try"

Single by Frankie J

from the album What's a Man to Do
- B-side: "Don't Wanna Try" (Spanglish version); "Ya No Es Igual"
- Released: April 8, 2003
- Genre: Pop; R&B
- Length: 4:12
- Label: Columbia
- Songwriter(s): Francisco Bautista; Jaime Gálvez

Frankie J singles chronology
"Don't Wanna Try" (2003)	"We Still" (2003)

"Don't Wanna Try" is a song which first appeared on the Kumbia Kings album 4 released in February 2003, credited as Kumbia Kings with Frankie J. Two months later, the song was released as Frankie J's debut solo single from his album What's a Man to Do. It reached number 19 on the US Billboard Hot 100. Both versions are almost identical, with only slight differences in instrumentation.

== Track listing ==
1. "Don't Wanna Try"
2. "Ya No Es Igual"
3. "Don't Wanna Try" (Spanglish version)

== Charts ==
=== Weekly charts ===
Weekly chart performance for "Don't Wanna Try"
Chart (2003)	Peak position
Australia (ARIA Charts)	81
US Billboard Hot 100	19
US Adult Contemporary (Billboard)	23
US Dance Club Songs (Billboard)	37
US Hot R&B/Hip-Hop Songs (Billboard)	80
US Pop Airplay (Billboard)	11
US Rhythmic (Billboard)	8

=== Year-end charts ===
Year-end chart performance for "Don't Wanna Try"
Chart (2003)	Position
US Billboard Hot 100	71
