= My Super Sweet 16 =

MTV reality series

- Directed by: Lucy J. Lesser; David L. Bowles
- Opening theme: "Sweet Sixteen" by Hilary Duff
- Country of origin: United States
- No. of seasons: 10
- No. of episodes: 94 (list of episodes)

Production
- Producers: Jordana Starr; Lucy J. Lesser; David L. Bowles
- Running time: 22 minutes

Original release
- Network: MTV
- Release: January 18, 2005 – September 11, 2017

My Super Sweet 16 is an American reality television series documenting the lives of teenagers, usually in the United States and Canada, generally with wealthy parents who throw lavish, excessive, and expensive coming-of-age celebrations. Parties include the quinceañera, the sweet 16, and other birthdays, including a My Super Sweet 21 (which was broadcast during MTV's spring break party) and My Super Swag 18. The show aired on MTV from January 18, 2005, to September 11, 2017. The opening theme is "Sweet Sixteen" sung by Hilary Duff.

== Episodes ==
Season	Episodes	Originally released	
Season	Episodes	First released	Last released
1	6	January 18, 2005	February 22, 2005
2	9	August 15, 2005	October 10, 2005
3	11	April 12, 2006	July 25, 2006
4	13	January 8, 2007	April 9, 2007
5	14	June 18, 2007	September 25, 2007
6	10	November 12, 2007	June 15, 2008
7	8	2008	2008
8	6	2008	2015
9	8	October 20, 2016	February 21, 2017
10	10	May 14, 2017	September 11, 2017

== Spin-offs ==
The series had two spin-offs, Exiled and The Real Deal, which both ended their run by 2010. The show has also covered several celebrity coming-of-age parties. Bow Wow, Sean Kingston, Aly & AJ, Chris Brown, Soulja Boy, and Teyana Taylor have all had their parties featured on the show. A United Kingdom version of the program was also produced, as was a Spanish version entitled Quiero mis quinces or Super Dulces 16.

MTV launched a spinoff in 2008 titled Exiled, involving the parents of some prior participants on My Super Sweet 16 "exiling" their teens to remote countries in order to see if their "sweet sixteener" will survive the harsh conditions. In 2009, MTV announced their newest addition to the franchise, My Super Psycho Sweet 16, a horror movie based on the concept of the show, which was aired on October 23, 2009 and followed by two sequels: Part 2 (2010) and Part 3 (2012).

In March 2010, MTV International commissioned Maverick TV in the UK to make a new, international version of the Super Sweet franchise. 10 episodes were produced, with interested parties encouraged to go to the casting website. The brand was also extended to include people having birthdays aged 13–24.

== Reception ==
In retrospect, Bustle identified "the main 14 elements [or tropes] which happened in most episodes which made it the supernova of a show that it truly is", including:

- "birthday tantrum[s]" ("the birthday boy or girl would be crying, screaming, stomping, or complaining about the fact that it's their birthday and they'll do what they want")
- the birthday boy or girl's "constant belligerence" against their parents in demanding more money
- "excessively decadent outfits"
- the party planner who is "tasked with organizing these unachievable birthday parties"
- overrunning the party budget
- "the obligatory party fight" when uninvited guests turn up
- large, expensive cars as birthday gifts
- a musical celebrity guest performing at the party

Bobcat Goldthwait noted that watching the My Super Sweet 16 marathon inspired him to write his controversial film God Bless America. Before attaining stardom in film, Jennifer Lawrence made her on-screen acting debut in an advertisement for the series depicting a fictional scenario (she never appeared in the series proper).

=== Criticism ===
English satirist Charlie Brooker gave a light-hearted criticism of the show on BBC4's Screenwipe, calling it "a stonehearted exposé of everything that's wrong with our faltering so-called civilization." He describes the protagonists by saying that "Each episode follows an unbelievably spoiled rich and tiny sod as they prepare to throw a despicably opulent coming of age party for themselves and their squealing shitcake friends." He said the show "might be an Al-Qaeda recruitment film." However, he added that "that's exactly how the show wants you to feel - it's even more efficient at creating instant hate figures than Big Brother, and that's saying something."

One teenager (Audrey Reyes) is seen screaming at her mother and saying she "hates" her after having received a new Lexus SC430, costing US$67,000, that was not on the day of the party. However, after the episode aired, she apologized for the tantrum.

== In popular culture ==
The hip-hop artist Common made a reference to the show, as well as Exiled, in a line from his single "The Game". "Watching Sweet Sixteen, bitchin'-ass rich kids, who, don't know, in life, that, you gotta go the distance".

In the film Bratz, a character, named Meredith, throws a super sweet 16 party and has MTV film it.

In the film Disaster Movie, the protagonist Will throws a super sweet 16 party.

The show was also parodied on an episode of Comedy Central's South Park ("Hell on Earth 2006") broadcast on October 25, 2006. Satan was intent on throwing an over-the-top Halloween bash. His behavior reflected that of the sweet 16ers, preparing for their coming-of-age birthdays. In the end, when Satan realizes his folly, the audience then considers the sweet 16ers to be "worse than Satan." Trey Parker further commented, "I can say.....every single girl that has been on that show, My Super Sweet 16, is evil. Is an evil, horrible person. It's just that simple."

In 2016, on the occasion of his 60th birthday, US actor Bryan Cranston (known for his role as Walter White in Breaking Bad) was featured in a parody titled "My Super Sweet 60" for the Jimmy Kimmel Live! show, with Kimmel as a party planner, and various guest stars, including musician Sisqo.

The show was parodied in the fourth season of Robot Chicken, in a sketch titled "Annie's Super Sweet 16". The segment follows the format of the show, with the episode featuring Annie Warbucks from the Little Orphan Annie comic strip. Cartoon Network's MAD also did a similar parody, called "My Supernatural Sweet 16." It has the main characters from Supernatural responding to an exorcism job involving a bratty teen from My Super Sweet 16.

On the sister channel Tr3s, the show Quiero Mis Quinces showcases the Latin American traditions of planning a quinceañera. More recently, the 2020 reboot of Animaniacs referenced it in a song.

In 2011 Nickelodeon produced a TV movie for the series Grachi, named "Quiero Mis 16: Matilda" (I Want My 16's: Matilda) which is a parody of My Super Sweet 16.

In the Season 4 Episode of Drake & Josh called "The Battle of Panthatar", Drake & Josh's classmate Thornton tells them his party will air live on MTV on a show called "Dude, I'm 16."

== Broadcast ==
In June 2018, it was announced that the series will stream on Hulu. It also currently airs on MTV Teen on the Pluto TV service. TeenNick also began airing the series in July 2019.

== See also ==
- Super Sweet 16: The Movie
- List of programs broadcast by MTV
