= Extreme discography =

- Studio albums: 6
- Extended plays: 2
- Live albums: 1
- Compilation albums: 2
- Singles: 21

American hard rock/heavy metal band Extreme has released six studio albums, two EPs (only in Japan), two compilations, and eighteen singles. This list does not include material performed by members or former members of Extreme that was recorded with DramaGods, Tribe of Judah, Mourning Widows, or Satellite Party.

== Albums ==
=== Studio albums ===
Title	Album details	Peak chart positions								Sales	Certifications (sales thresholds)
Title	Album details	US	AUS	AUT	JPN	NLD	NOR	SWE	UK	Sales	Certifications (sales thresholds)
Extreme	Released: March 14, 1989; Label: A&M; Format: CD, cassette, LP	80	97	—	—	—	—	—	—	US: 300,000	
Pornograffitti	Released: August 7, 1990; Label: A&M; Format: CD, cassette, LP	10	27	17	32	16	20	37	12		RIAA: 2× Platinum; ARIA: Gold; BPI: Platinum; MC: 3× Platinum
III Sides to Every Story	Released: September 22, 1992; Label: A&M; Format: CD, cassette, LP	10	42	27	5	13	17	14	2		RIAA: Gold; BPI: Platinum; MC: Platinum
Waiting for the Punchline	Released: February 7, 1995; Label: A&M; Format: CD, cassette, LP	40	51	37	4	65	—	29	10	US: 100,000	
Saudades de Rock	Released: August 12, 2008; Label: Open E; Format: CD	78	—	—	13	—	—	—	146		
Six	Released: June 9, 2023; Label: earMUSIC; Format: CD, LP	67	32	6	12	46	—	6	22		
"—" denotes releases that did not chart.

=== Live albums ===
Title	Album details	Peak chart positions
Title	Album details	JPN
Take Us Alive	Released: May 4, 2010; Label: Frontiers; Format: CD, digital download	110
Pornograffitti Live 25 / Metal Meltdown	Released: September 21, 2016; Label: Loud & Proud; Format: CD	—
"—" denotes releases that did not chart.

=== Compilation albums ===
Title	Album details	Peak chart positions
Title	Album details	JPN
The Best of Extreme: An Accidental Collocation of Atoms?	Released: March 1998; Label: A&M; Format: CD	70
The Collection	Released: 2002; Label: Spectrum; Format: CD	—
"—" denotes releases that did not chart.

== Other appearances ==
=== Studio ===
Year	Song(s)	Album
1992	"Christmas Time Again"	A Very Special Christmas 2
1993	"Where Are You Going?"	Super Mario Bros.

== Extended plays ==
Title	EP details	Peak chart positions
Title	EP details	JPN
Extragraffitti	Released: 1990; Label: Japanese release; Format: CD	—
Running Gag	Released: 30 June 1995; Label: Japanese release; Format: CD	69
"—" denotes releases that did not chart.

== Singles ==
Title	Year	Peak chart positions											Certifications	Album
Title	Year	US	US Main. Rock	AUS	AUT	FRA	GER	NLD	NOR	SWE	SWI	UK	Certifications	Album
"Little Girls"	1989	—	—	—	—	—	—	—	—	—	—	—		Extreme
"Kid Ego"	1989	—	39	138	—	—	—	—	—	—	—	—		Extreme
"Mutha (Don't Wanna Go to School Today)"	1989	—	—	—	—	—	—	—	—	—	—	—		Extreme
"Play with Me"	1989	—	—	—	—	—	—	—	—	—	—	—		Extreme
"Decadence Dance"	1990	—	45	—	—	—	—	—	—	—	—	36		Pornograffitti
"Get the Funk Out"	1990	—	34	95	—	—	—	33	—	—	—	19		Pornograffitti
"More Than Words"	1991	1	12	2	13	8	8	1	4	4	3	2	RIAA: Gold; ARIA: Platinum; BPI: Gold; IFPI SWE: Gold; MC: Platinum	Pornograffitti
"Hole Hearted"	1991	4	2	24	—	—	48	9	—	30	—	12		Pornograffitti
"Song for Love"	1992	—	—	—	—	—	—	—	—	—	—	12		Pornograffitti
"Rest in Peace"	1992	96	1	76	—	—	—	31	—	24	20	13		III Sides to Every Story
"Stop the World"	1993	95	9	128	—	—	—	—	—	—	—	22		III Sides to Every Story
"Tragic Comic"	1993	—	—	—	—	—	—	—	—	—	—	15		III Sides to Every Story
"Am I Ever Gonna Change?"	1993	—	10	—	—	—	—	—	—	—	—	—		III Sides to Every Story
"There Is No God"	1994	—	—	—	—	—	—	—	—	—	—	—		Waiting for the Punchline
"Hip Today"	1995	—	26	99	—	—	—	—	—	—	—	44		Waiting for the Punchline
"Cynical"	1995	—	—	—	—	—	—	—	—	—	—	—		Waiting for the Punchline
"Unconditionally"	1995	—	—	—	—	—	—	—	—	—	—	—		Waiting for the Punchline
"Star"	2008	—	—	—	—	—	—	—	—	—	—	—		Saudades de Rock
"Rise"	2023	—	—	—	—	—	—	—	—	—	—	—		Six
"Banshee"	2023	—	—	—	—	—	—	—	—	—	—	—		Six
"#Rebel"	2023	—	—	—	—	—	—	—	—	—	—	—		Six
"Other Side of the Rainbow"	2023	—	—	—	—	—	—	—	—	—	—	—		Six
"—" denotes releases that did not chart.
