= Take Us Alive World Tour =

2008 concert tour by Extreme

- Tour by Extreme
- Location: North America; Europe; Asia
- Associated album: Saudades de Rock
- Start date: July 11, 2008
- End date: December 15, 2008
- Legs: 3
- No. of shows: 51; 23 in North America; 19 in Europe; 9 in Asia

Extreme concert chronology
- 2006 Reunion Mini-Tour (2006); Take Us Alive World Tour (2008); East Meets West Tour '09 (2009)

The Take Us Alive World Tour was a concert tour by hard rock band Extreme, taking place in from mid to late 2008, in support of Saudades de Rock, their first album of original material in 13 years, and the first since their reunion in 2007. It was considered their reunion tour, and their first full-scale world tour together since 1995. It was also the band's first tour with new drummer, Kevin Figueiredo.

The band began the North American leg with a performance at the Rocklahoma in Pryor, Oklahoma, on July 11, with the official headlining North American leg beginning on July 29, supported by King's X, with Living Colour also supporting on one date. Most of the European leg was supported by Voodoo Six the London-based UK rock band formed by former Dirty Deeds bass player and producer Tony Newton, and The Duvals, with Hot Leg and The Duvals supporting on all UK dates.

Various covers were played during the tour including Led Zeppelin's "Communication Breakdown", Queen's "Nevermore" and James Brown's "Mother Popcorn".

== Set list ==
North American Leg
- "IIIrd Side Strings"
- "Decadence Dance"
- "Comfortably Dumb"
- "Rest in Peace"
- "Star"
- "Tell Me Something I Don't Know"
- "Kid Ego"
- "Little Girls"
- "Teacher's Pet"
- "Play with Me"
- "Midnight Express"
- "More Than Words"
- "Ghost"
- "Cupid's Dead"
- "Take Us Alive"
- "Am I Ever Gonna Change"
- "Flight of the Wounded Bumblebee"
- "Get the Funk Out"

Encore

- "Hole Hearted"
- "Communication Breakdown" (Led Zeppelin cover)
European Leg
- "Comfortably Dumb"
- "Decadence Dance"
- "Rest in Peace"
- "It ('s a Monster)"
- "Star"
- "Tell Me Something I Don't Know"
- "Kid Ego"
- "Little Girls"
- "Teacher's Pet"
- "Play with Me"
- "Midnight Express"
- "More Than Words"
- "Ghost"
- "Cupid's Dead"
- "Take Us Alive"
- "Flight of the Wounded Bumblebee"
- "Get the Funk Out"

Encore

- "Am I Ever Gonna Change"
- "Hole Hearted"
- "Mutha (Don't Wanna Go to School Today)"
Asian Leg
- "Comfortably Dumb"
- "Decadence Dance"
- "Rest in Peace"
- "Warheads"
- "Star"
- "Tell Me Something I Don't Know"
- "Kid Ego"
- "Little Girls"
- "Teacher's Pet"
- "Play with Me"
- "Midnight Express"
- "Nevermore" (Queen cover)
- "More Than Words"
- "Ghost"
- "Mother Popcorn" (James Brown cover)
- "Cupid's Dead"
- "Take Us Alive"
- "He-Man Woman Hater"
- "Get the Funk Out"

Encore

- "Am I Ever Gonna Change"
- "Hole Hearted"

== Tour dates ==
Date	City	Country	Venue	Support act(s)
North America
July 11, 2008	Pryor	United States	Rocklahoma	—
July 29, 2008	Poughkeepsie	United States	The Chance	King's X
July 31, 2008	Boston	United States	BOA Pavilion	King's X
August 1, 2008	Long Island	United States	Brookhaven Amphitheater	Living Colour; King's X
August 2, 2008	Baltimore	United States	Rams Head Live!	King's X
August 4, 2008	New York City	United States	The Fillmore New York at Irving Plaza	King's X
August 5, 2008	Lancaster	United States	Chameleon Club	King's X
August 6, 2008	Cleveland	United States	House of Blues	King's X
August 8, 2008	Detroit	United States	Emerald Theater	King's X
August 9, 2008	Chicago	United States	House of Blues	King's X
August 10, 2008	Cincinnati	United States	Union Centre Boulevard Bash	King's X
August 12, 2008	Charlotte	United States	Amos' Southend	King's X
August 13, 2008	Atlanta	United States	Center Stage	King's X
August 15, 2008	Orlando	United States	House of Blues	King's X
August 16, 2008	Fort Lauderdale	United States	Revolution	King's X
August 18, 2008	New Orleans	United States	House of Blues	King's X
August 19, 2008	Houston	United States	Meridian	King's X
August 20, 2008	Dallas	United States	House of Blues	King's X
August 22, 2008	Phoenix	United States	The Marquee	King's X
August 23, 2008	Las Vegas	United States	House of Blues	King's X
August 25, 2008	San Francisco	United States	The Fillmore	King's X
August 26, 2008	Los Angeles	United States	House of Blues	King's X
August 30, 2008	Syracuse	United States	Great New York State Fair	King's X
Europe
September 13, 2008	Milan	Italy	Rock of Ages Festival	—
October 29, 2008	Lisbon	Portugal	Coliseum	Voodoo Six
October 31, 2008	Madrid	Spain	La Riviera	Voodoo Six
November 1, 2008	Bilbao	Spain	Rock Star Live	Voodoo Six
November 3, 2008	Tilburg	Netherlands	013 Tilburg	Voodoo Six
November 4, 2008	Paris	France	Élysée Montmartre	Voodoo Six
November 5, 2008	Cologne	Germany	Essigfabrik	Voodoo Six
November 8, 2008	Dublin	Ireland	The Academy	Voodoo Six
November 9, 2008	Belfast	Northern Ireland	Spring & Airbrake	Voodoo Six
November 11, 2008	Cambridge	England	Cambridge Corn Exchange	Voodoo Six; The Duvals
November 12, 2008	Norwich	England	Norwich UEA	Voodoo Six; The Duvals
November 14, 2008	Leeds	England	O2 Academy Leeds	Hot Leg; The Duvals
November 15, 2008	Glasgow	Scotland	O2 Academy Glasgow	Hot Leg; The Duvals
November 17, 2008	Newcastle upon Tyne	England	Newcastle City Hall	Hot Leg; The Duvals
November 18, 2008	Manchester	England	Manchester Academy	Hot Leg; The Duvals
November 20, 2008	Newport	Wales	Newport Centre	Hot Leg; The Duvals
November 21, 2008	Southampton	England	Southampton Guildhall	Hot Leg; The Duvals
November 23, 2008	Birmingham	England	O2 Academy Birmingham	Hot Leg; The Duvals
November 24, 2008	London	England	London Astoria	Hot Leg; The Duvals
Asia
December 1, 2008	Tokyo	Japan	Shibuya C.C. Lemon Hall	—
December 2, 2008	Tokyo	Japan	Shibuya C.C. Lemon Hall	—
December 4, 2008	Tokyo	Japan	Shibuya C.C. Lemon Hall	—
December 5, 2008	Tokyo	Japan	Shibuya C.C. Lemon Hall	—
December 8, 2008	Osaka	Japan	Koseinenkin Kaikan	—
December 9, 2008	Nagoya	Japan	Nagoya Civic Assembly Hall	—
December 10, 2008	Hiroshima	Japan	Yubin Chokin Hall	—
December 13, 2008	Seoul	South Korea	Melon-AX Hall	—
December 15, 2008	Jakarta	Indonesia	Tennis Indoor Senayan	—

== Personnel ==
- Gary Cherone - lead vocals
- Nuno Bettencourt - lead guitar, vocals
- Pat Badger - bass, backing vocals
- Kevin Figueiredo - drums, percussion
