= East Meets West Tour =

2009 concert tour by Extreme

East Meets West Tour '09
- Tour by Extreme
- Location: North America
- Associated album: Saudades de Rock
- Start date: May 30, 2009
- End date: August 8, 2009
- Legs: 1
- No. of shows: 20

Extreme concert chronology
- Take Us Alive World Tour (2008); East Meets West Tour '09 (2009)

The East Meets West Tour '09 was a concert tour by hard rock band Extreme, taking place in the summer of 2009, in support of their 2008 album Saudades de Rock. It followed the Take Us Alive World Tour in 2008 which was in support of the same album. The tour started with a performance at the M3 Rock Festival on May 30, with the official tour beginning on July 12. This tour was co-headlined with Ratt on almost all dates, excluding New Haven, Springfield and Boston.

== Set list ==
2009
- "Decadence Dance"
- "It ('s a Monster)"
- "Star"
- "Rest in Peace"
- "Am I Ever Gonna Change"
- "Play with Me"
- "Midnight Express"
- "More Than Words"
- "Cupid's Dead"
- "Take Us Alive"
- "Kid Ego"
- "Little Girls"

Encore

- "Hole Hearted"
- "Wanna Be Startin' Somethin'" (Michael Jackson cover)
- "Get the Funk Out"

== Tour dates ==
Date	City	Country	Venue
North America
May 30, 2009	Columbia	United States	M3 Rock Festival
w/ Ratt
July 12, 2009	Amarillo	United States	Midnight Rodeo
July 13, 2009	San Antonio	United States	Scout Bar
July 14, 2009	Odessa	United States	Dos Amigos
July 16, 2009	Tempe	United States	Marquee Theatre
July 17, 2009	Los Angeles	United States	Wiltern Theatre
July 18, 2009	Paradise	United States	Hard Rock Hotel and Casino
July 19, 2009	Anaheim	United States	House of Blues
July 22, 2009	Denver	United States	Ogden Theatre
July 23, 2009	Kansas City	United States	Crossroads Music Festival
July 24, 2009	Chicago	United States	House of Blues
July 26, 2009	Cheswick	United States	Ches-a-rena
July 28, 2009	New York City	United States	Nokia Theatre
July 30, 2009	Westbury	United States	Westbury Theater
August 1, 2009	New Haven	United States	Toad's Place*
August 2, 2009	Allentown	United States	Crock Rock Festival
August 5, 2009	Springfield	United States	Jaxx*
August 6, 2009	Sayerville	United States	Starland Ballroom
August 7, 2009	Hampton Beach	United States	Hampton Beach Casino Ballroom
August 8, 2009	Boston	United States	House of Blues*

- * = Extreme only

== Personnel ==
- Gary Cherone – lead vocals
- Nuno Bettencourt – lead guitar, vocals
- Pat Badger – bass, backing vocals
- Kevin Figueiredo – drums, percussion
