= Take Us Alive =

Live album by Extreme
- Released: May 4, 2010
- Recorded: August 8, 2009
- Venues: House of Blues (Boston, Massachusetts)
- Genres: Funk metal, hard rock
- Label: Frontiers
- Producer: Extreme/Devin Dehaven

Extreme chronology
Saudades de Rock (2008)	Take Us Alive (2010)	Six (2023)

Take Us Alive is a live album by the American rock band Extreme, first released in May 2010. The set features the final concert on the East Meets West Tour recorded at House of Blues in Boston on 8 August 2009. It has 17 tracks and four bonus DVD only tracks.

Guitarist Nuno Bettencourt said of the recording: "We wanted to do something really special for our hometown fans that were there for us since the beginning... the club days. It was the last night of the tour and we couldn't think of a better way to celebrate than by bringing it back to where it all started... Boston."

Some audio parts were re-recorded in the studio for the CD/DVD release.

== Track listing ==
1. "Decadence Dance" – 8:12
2. "Comfortably Dumb" - 5:23
3. "Rest In Peace" – 5:21
4. "It's A Monster" – 5:29
5. "Star" – 5:42
6. "Tell Me Something I Don't Know" – 7:59
7. "Medley: Kid Ego/Little Girls/Teacher's Pet" – 6:00
8. "Play with Me" – 9:06
9. "Midnight Express" – 4:10
10. "More Than Words" – 7:26
11. "Ghost" – 4:51
12. "Cupid's Dead" – 6:58
13. "Take Us Alive" – 6:04
14. "Flight Of The Wounded Bumblebee" – 1:51
15. "Get the Funk Out" – 7:37
16. "Am I Ever Gonna Change" – 6:57
17. "Hole Hearted" – 4:13

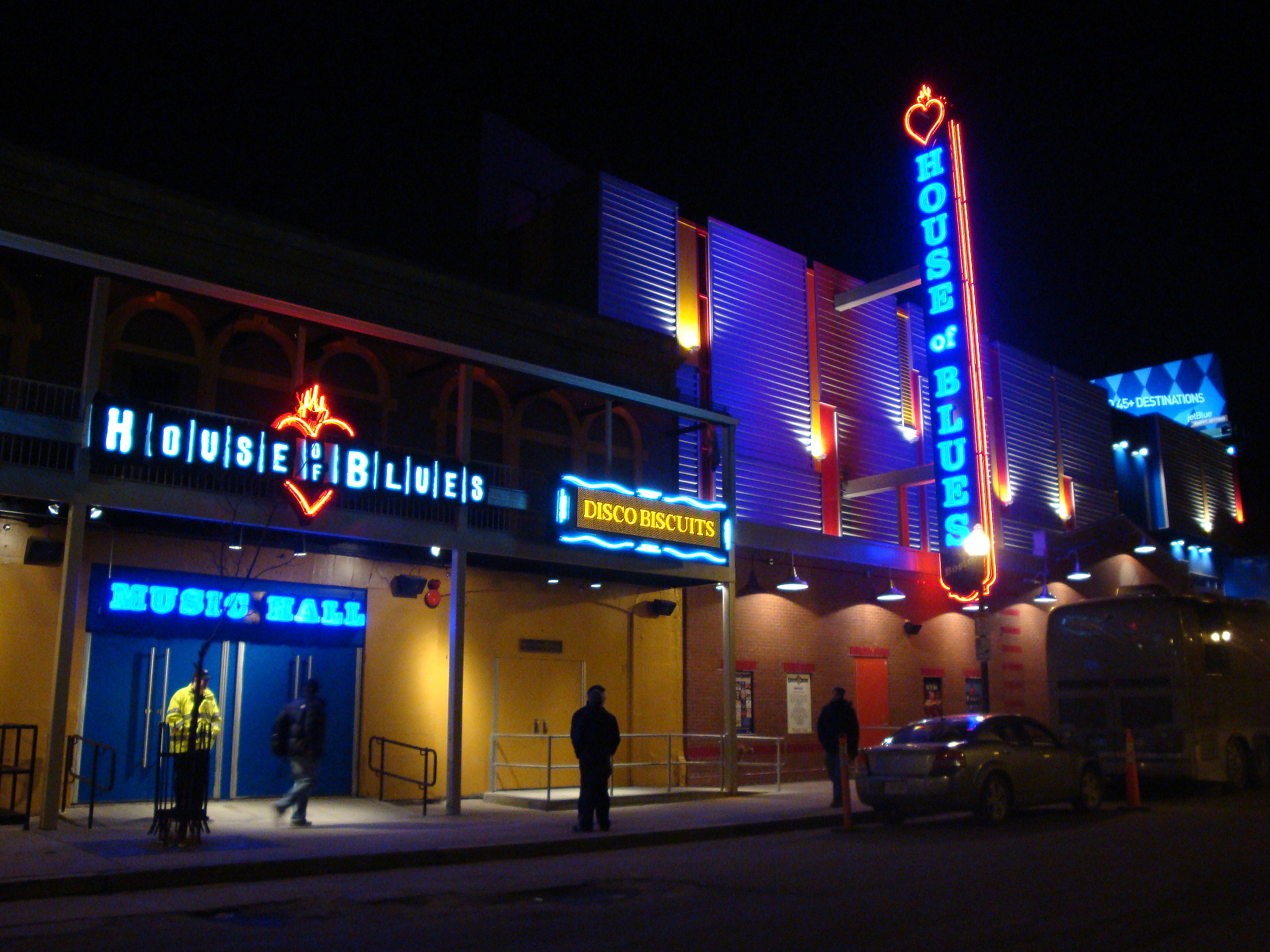
House of Blues, Boston

=== Bonus DVD track listing ===
1. "King of the Ladies" (music video)
2. "Interface" (music video)
3. "Run" (music video)
4. "Ghost" (music video)

== Charts ==
Chart (2010)	Peak position
Japanese Albums (Oricon)	110
