= Hurtsmile =

American hard rock band

- Origin: Boston, Massachusetts, United States
- Genres: Hard rock
- Years active: 2007–present
- Members: Gary Cherone; Mark Cherone; Joe Pessia; Dana Spellman

Hurtsmile is a band fronted by Extreme singer Gary Cherone.

Cherone started the project in 2007 with his brother Mark and Joe Pessia. Some demos were released on the internet, but plans for an album were put on hold once plans for the eventual Extreme reunion emerged. After the release of Saudades de Rock and the subsequent 2009 tour, Extreme member Nuno Bettencourt went on tour with Rihanna, putting Extreme on hiatus and giving time for Cherone to return to the Hurtsmile project. The album was then recorded and released January 2011 in Europe and February 2011 in the US.

Besides brothers Gary and Mark Cherone, who also play together in Slip Kid, a The Who tribute band, the band features Joe Pessia, who plays with Tantric and was the bassist for Bettencourt's DramaGods and drummer Dana Spellman, who was a student of Extreme's former drummer Mike Mangini.

== Band members ==
- Gary Cherone - lead vocals
- Mark Cherone - guitars
- Joe Pessia - bass guitar
- Dana Spellman - drums

== Discography ==
=== Studio albums ===
- Hurtsmile (2011)
- Retrogrenade (2014)
