= Kevin Figueiredo =

American drummer

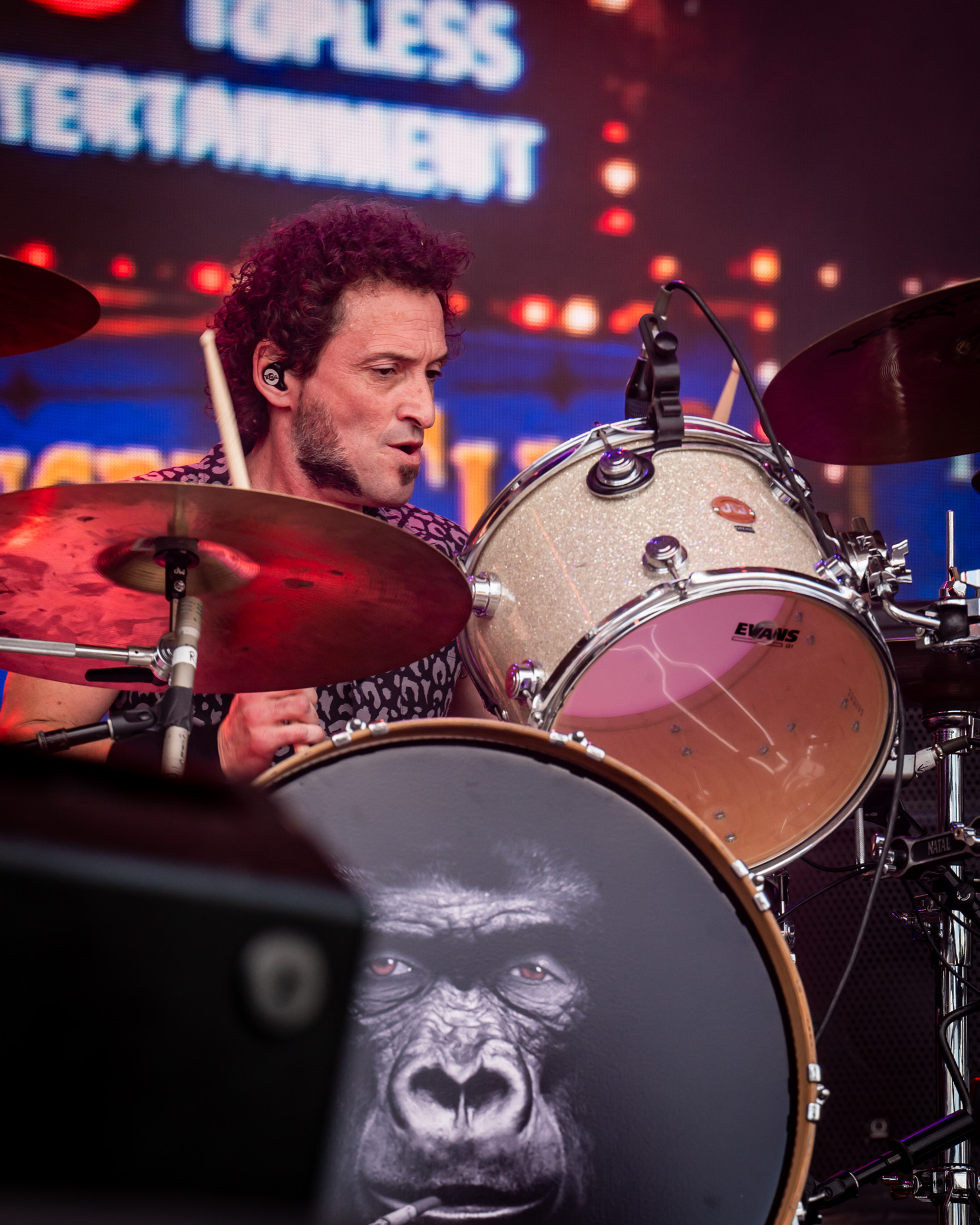
- Figueiredo in 2024

Background information
- Also known as: k-Figg
- Born: January 12, 1977 (age 49); Hudson, Massachusetts, U.S.
- Genres: Hard rock, funk metal, heavy metal, glam metal, alternative rock
- Occupation: Drummer
- Member of: Extreme
- Formerly of: The Satellite Party, DramaGods

Kevin "k-Figg" Figueiredo is an American drummer and a member of the hard rock band Extreme.

== Biography ==
Kevin Figueiredo was born in Hudson, Massachusetts, into a Portuguese family from Santa Maria, Azores.

Figueiredo began playing drums at the age of ten, when his grandfather bought him a drum kit. He studied with jazz drummer Bob Gullotti "The Fringe" and Mike Mangini, who collectively exposed him to many different approaches to drumming.

In November 2007, Figueiredo joined the reuniting band Extreme including original members Gary Cherone, Pat Badger and Nuno Bettencourt, with whom Figueiredo performed in both Satellite Party and DramaGods (previously known as Population 1). He replaced mentor Mike Mangini, who had taken over drum duties from Extreme's original drummer, Paul Geary, from 1994 to 1996.

He has also performed with artists/bands such as Slash, Nuno Bettencourt, Chester Bennington, Perry Farrell, Lucia Moniz and Tantric.

== Equipment ==
Figueiredo endorses DW drums, Evans drumheads, Zildjian cymbals and Vater drumsticks.

== Discography ==
=== With Population 1 ===
- Sessions from Room 4 (2004)

=== With DramaGods ===
- Love (2005)

=== With The Satellite Party ===
- Ultra Payloaded (2007)

=== With Extreme ===
- Saudades de Rock (2008)
- Take Us Alive (2010)
- Six (2023)
