= Six (Extreme album) =

Studio album by Extreme
- Released: June 9, 2023
- Studios: AE Records Studios, Hollywood; AE Records Studios Azores, Portugal
- Genre: Hard rock
- Length: 52:35
- Label: earMusic
- Producer: Nuno Bettencourt

Extreme chronology
Take Us Alive (2010)	Six (2023)

Singles from SIX
- 1. "Rise" Released: 2023; 2. "Banshee/#Rebel" Released: 2023; 3. "Other Side Of The Rainbow" Released: 2023; 4. "The Mask" Released: 2023; 5. "Hurricane" Released: 2023; 6. "Beautiful Girls" Released: 2024; 7. "X-Out" Released: 2025

Professional ratings
Review scores
Source	Rating
AllMusic	3.5/5 stars
Blabbermouth.net	8/10
Classic Rock	4/5 stars
Ultimate Classic Rock	positive

Six is the sixth studio album by American hard rock band Extreme, released on June 9, 2023. It is their first studio album since Saudades de Rock, released in 2008.

== Release and reception ==
In the lead-up for the album release, on March 1, 2023, Extreme released a video of "Rise" as a first single. The video crossed 1 million views in its first week, propelled by interest in Nuno Bettencourt's guitar solo, which led to a number of analysis videos, including a reaction by Justin Hawkins from The Darkness, and breakdown by Rick Beato. Readers of Total Guitar magazine voted the song's solo the third best of the 21st century in a 2023 poll.

"Rise" was followed by a double A-side single released on April 19, featuring songs "#Rebel" and "Banshee". Each song was accompanied by a music video. The fourth and final song released prior to the album launch was "Other Side of the Rainbow", released May 31. In the month of the album's release, Nuno Bettencourt was featured in the cover of several guitar magazines, including Total Guitar, Japan's Young Guitar, the French edition of Rolling Stone, and Germany's Guitar.

The name of the gorilla that appears on the cover of the Six album is Pakenuga, according to Nuno Bettencourt. The name is a composite of the first two letters of each band member's first name (Pat, Kevin, Nuno, Gary).

== Track listing ==
Six track listing
No.	Title	Writer(s)	Length
1.	"Rise"	Gary Cherone; Jordan Ferreira; Nuno Bettencourt	4:35
2.	"#Rebel"	Cherone; Ferreira; Matthew James McGuire-Denis; Bettencourt	4:23
3.	"Banshee"	Cherone; Bettencourt; Pat Badger	3:34
4.	"Other Side of the Rainbow"	Cherone; Bettencourt	4:11
5.	"Small Town Beautiful"	Brian Maher; Cherone; Bettencourt	4:27
6.	"The Mask"	Andy Healy; Bettencourt	4:13
7.	"Thicker Than Blood"	Cherone; Kevin Antunes; Bettencourt	3:46
8.	"Save Me"	Cherone; Ferreira; Bettencourt	4:51
9.	"Hurricane"	Eric Warfield; Bettencourt	3:31
10.	"X Out"	Eric Warfield; Cherone; Ferreira; Bettencourt	5:50
11.	"Beautiful Girls"	Carl Restivo; Cherone; J. Plotsky; Bettencourt	4:04
12.	"Here's to the Losers"	Cherone; Bettencourt	5:05

== Personnel ==
Credits adapted from the album's booklet.

Extreme

- Gary Cherone – lead vocals
- Nuno Bettencourt – guitars, keyboards, backing vocals, co-lead vocals on "Smalltown Beautiful", "The Mask", "Hurricane", "X Out" and "Beautiful Girls"
- Pat Badger – bass, backing vocals
- Kevin Figueiredo – drums, percussion

Additional musicians

- Navene Koperweis – additional programming
- Kevin Antunes – additional programming, additional keyboards
- Carl Restivo – additional background vocals, additional guitars
- August Zadra – additional background vocals
- Jordan Ferreira – additional guitars

Production

- Nuno Bettencourt – producer, engineering, mixing
- Patricia Sullivan – mastering (Bernie Grundman Mastering)

Imagery

- Nuno Bettencourt – cover concept
- Alexander Mertsch – layout and design
- Wirestock Inc./Alamy Stock Photo – cover photo
- Jesse Lirola – band photography

== Charts ==
Chart performance for Six
Chart (2023)	Peak position
Australian Albums (ARIA)	32
Austrian Albums (Ö3 Austria)	6
Belgian Albums (Ultratop Flanders)	49
Belgian Albums (Ultratop Wallonia)	31
Dutch Albums (Album Top 100)	46
Finnish Albums (Suomen virallinen lista)	49
French Albums (SNEP)	46
German Albums (Offizielle Top 100)	8
Hungarian Albums (MAHASZ)	10
Italian Albums (FIMI)	71
Japanese Albums (Oricon)	12
Japanese Digital Albums (Oricon)	3
Japanese Hot Albums (Billboard Japan)	9
Scottish Albums (Official Charts)	8
Spanish Albums (Promusicae)	36
Swiss Albums (Schweizer Hitparade)	4
UK Albums (Official Charts)	22
UK Independent Albums (Official Charts)	4
UK Rock & Metal Albums (Official Charts)	2
US Billboard 200	67
