= Sessions from Room 4 =

EP by Population 1
- Released: 2004
- Recorded: February, April and June 2003
- Genre: Rock
- Length: 22:30
- Label: Bruno Graffiti Records, Inc.
- Producer: Nuno Bettencourt

Population 1 chronology
Population 1 (2002)	Sessions from Room 4 (2004)	Love (2005)

Sessions from Room 4 is an EP released by the band Population 1, led by Extreme/DramaGods guitarist Nuno Bettencourt. The EP is the first official release from the band Population 1, which was previously just a solo project by Nuno Bettencourt. They had to change the name of the band, not once, but twice for legal reasons. They were briefly known as Near Death Experience (a name Bettencourt had floated before for previous projects) and subsequently DramaGods, under which they released their next and only album to date, "Love". "Sessions From Room 4" was released through the band's official website, and came with stickers and a limited edition autographed poster of the band.

== Tracks ==
All tracks written by Bettencourt.

1. "What U Leave Behind" – 5:53
2. "Exit" – 4:05
3. "Nothing but Trouble" – 4:46
4. "Tragedy" – 3:15
5. "On and On" – 4:31

== Personnel ==
- Nuno Bettencourt – guitars, vocals
- Joe Pessia – bass
- Steve Ferlazzo – keyboards, background vocals
- Kevin Figueiredo – drums, background vocals
