= Stop the World (Extreme song) =

1992 single by Extreme

Single by Extreme

from the album III Sides to Every Story
- Released: November 2, 1992
- Length: 5:58
- Label: A&M
- Songwriters: Nuno Bettencourt; Gary Cherone
- Producers: Nuno Bettencourt; Bob St. John

Extreme singles chronology
"Rest in Peace" (1992)	"Stop the World" (1992)	"Tragic Comic" (1993)

"Stop the World" is a song from American rock band Extreme's third studio album, III Sides to Every Story (1992). It was released as the second single from the album in November 1992 by A&M Records. It charted in the United Kingdom, where it peaked at number 22. The song also peaked at number 82 on the US Cash Box Top 100 and number 128 in Australia. The accompanying music video features the late model Kadamba Simmons running away from a man pursuing her.

== Track listing ==
1. "Stop The World" (radio edit) – 4:38
2. "Christmas Time Again"
3. "Warheads" – 5:18
4. "Don't Leave Me Alone" – 5:44

== Charts ==
Chart (1992–1993)	Peak position
Australia (ARIA)	128
UK Singles (OCC)	22
UK Airplay (Music Week)	46
US Cash Box Top 100	82

== Release history ==
Region	Date	Format(s)	Label(s)	Ref.
United Kingdom	November 2, 1992	7-inch vinyl; 12-inch vinyl; CD; cassette	A&M	
Australia	February 14, 1993	CD; cassette	A&M	
