= Steve Ferlazzo =

American musician

Stephen Anthony Ferlazzo Jr. is an American keyboard player, based in California. After graduating at the Berklee School of Music, he has played with two members of Extreme in their projects after the band broke up: he was the keyboardist for Gary Cherone in his Tribe of Judah project, and for Nuno Bettencourt in his DramaGods band.

He guested on the debut Science Faxtion album, Living on Another Frequency and toured with Avril Lavigne. He is the creator and organizer of the monthly (formerly weekly) live music production Soundcheck Live, which takes place at Lucky Strike Live in Hollywood, California.

== Discography ==
- Sunshine Jive, Sunshine Jive (1998)
- Exit Elvis, Tribe of Judah (2002)
- Sessions from Room 4, Population 1, 2004 (EP)
- Love, DramaGods, 2005
- The Best Damn Thing - Bonus DVD, Avril Lavigne (2007)
- Legend of the Mask and the Assassin, DJ Muggs vs. Sick Jacken (2007)
- Living on Another Frequency, Science Faxtion (2008)
- Pain Language, DJ Muggs vs. Panet Asia (2008)
- The Best Damn Tour: Live in Toronto - DVD, Avril Lavigne (2008)
- U Got What U Wanted - In the Pink (2018)
