= III Sides to Every Story =

Studio album by Extreme
- Released: September 14, 1992
- Recorded: Early 1992
- Studios: New River Studios, Fort Lauderdale, Florida; Abbey Road Studios, London (orchestra)
- Genres: Funk metal; glam metal; art rock
- Length: 81:45
- Label: A&M
- Producers: Nuno Bettencourt; Bob St. John

Extreme chronology
Extreme II: Pornograffitti (1990)	III Sides to Every Story (1992)	Waiting for the Punchline (1995)

Singles from III Sides to Every Story
- 1. "Rest in Peace" Released: August 24, 1992; 2. "Stop the World" Released: November 2, 1992; 3. "Tragic Comic" Released: January 25, 1993

III Sides to Every Story (pronounced "three sides to every story") is the third studio album by the American rock band Extreme, released on September 14, 1992, through A&M Records. It was the follow-up to the very successful Pornograffitti album. It was the last album that fully featured the band's original line-up: Gary Cherone, Nuno Bettencourt, Pat Badger and Paul Geary before Geary's departure in 1994.

== Overview ==
The album is structured as a concept album in three sections labeled as "sides", a play on the notion of "different sides to a story" and that of "sides" of an album (in LP and cassette media). The sides, mentioned in the song "Cupid's Dead" as "three sides to every story" are named "Yours", "Mine" and "The Truth", and each features a distinct musical style and lyrical imagery.

Although this was their third record, bootleg recordings from Extreme's earlier days confirm that at least two tracks for this album ("Warheads" and "Our Father") existed and were performed in almost identical arrangements several years prior, dating back to the time of their first record.

Yours is made of hard rock songs, the guitar-centric style which the band had explored the most on their previous albums. Their funk-metal tendencies are present in tracks such as "Cupid's Dead", which also features a rap section performed by guest John Preziosa Jr. As a whole, this side deals with political subjects: war ("Warheads"), peace ("Rest in Peace"), government ("Politicalamity"), racism ("Color Me Blind"), media ("Cupid's Dead"). Summing up these matters, the side closes with "Peacemaker Die", a tribute to Martin Luther King Jr., which features a recording of his famous 1963 "I Have A Dream" speech.

Mine, in total contrast, deals with introspective subjects. In accordance, the band departs from its guitar sound and experiments with different arrangements on this side, with Nuno Bettencourt playing keyboards in addition to (and in some tracks, instead of) the guitar. The side opening song, "Seven Sundays", is a slow waltz with prominent keyboards and no guitars. "Tragic Comic" is a mostly acoustic track telling a light-hearted love story. "Our Father" is sung from the perspective of the child of an absent father (although many interpret the song to be dealing with God as The Father). With "Stop The World", the album starts to delve into more philosophical questions, expressing existential doubts — a theme that leads to religion, with "God Isn't Dead?" (written with the verb form as an affirmation but with a question mark — the chorus says "Please tell me God isn't dead... I want to know") and "Don't Leave Me Alone", a dramatic plea. The latter was not included in the CD version because of lack of space; Bettencourt recalls leaving it out "was like cutting off my arm". Despite not being bound by the limitations of the CD format, the version of the album downloadable from iTunes also omits "Don't Leave Me Alone".

Finally, The Truth consists of a three-part opus, titled "Everything Under the Sun", ending the three-part album. This side nods to progressive rock not only in format but also in musical style, with changes in time signature and an intricate arrangement, featuring a 70-piece orchestra. Lyrically, the spiritual theme set up in the end of "Mine" is further developed and Christian imagery is very present.

The use of Roman numerals in the title is intended to denote "III Sides" as the band’s third album and to continue the theme from their previous album, the full title of which was Extreme II: Pornograffitti. On the album cover graphics, the last ‘E’ in ‘Extreme’ is also the ‘III’ in the album title.

== Production ==
Most of III Sides was recorded at New River Studios, Ft. Lauderdale, Florida, and the orchestral parts were recorded at Abbey Road Studios, London. The use of Abbey Road may be perceived as yet another nod to the Beatles, besides the various lyrical references throughout the album: "Cupid's Dead" quotes a line from "A Day in the Life"; "God Isn't Dead?" quotes "Eleanor Rigby"; and "Rest in Peace" quotes John Lennon's "Give Peace a Chance". Additionally, Pat Badger is seen playing a Höfner 500/1 bass, similar to that used by Paul McCartney, in the music video for "Tragic Comic".

== Reception ==
Professional ratings
Review scores
Source	Rating
AllMusic	3/5 stars
Collector's Guide to Heavy Metal	10/10
The Daily Vault	B
Entertainment Weekly	B+
Q	3/5 stars

Despite being considered one of Extreme's best albums by fans and music critics, III Sides to Every Story was a commercial failure (only selling about 700,000 copies, compared to the double platinum Pornograffitti), since it did not feature a hit single such as "More Than Words" (which reached number one on the Billboard Hot 100 chart in 1991), from its predecessor Pornograffitti (although the single "Rest in Peace" reached number one on the Mainstream Rock chart). Also, the particular brand of hard rock for which Extreme was known was falling out of favor with the rise of the grunge movement around that time.

== Track listing ==
All tracks are written by Gary Cherone & Nuno Bettencourt.

Yours
No.	Title	Length
1.	"Warheads"	5:18
2.	"Rest in Peace"	6:02
3.	"Politicalamity"	5:04
4.	"Color Me Blind"	5:01
5.	"Cupid's Dead"	5:56
6.	"Peacemaker Die"	6:03

Mine
No.	Title	Length
7.	"Seven Sundays"	4:18
8.	"Tragic Comic"	4:45
9.	"Our Father"	4:02
10.	"Stop the World"	5:58
11.	"God Isn't Dead?"	2:02
12.	"Don't Leave Me Alone"	5:42

The Truth
No.	Title	Length
13.	"Everything Under the Sun: I. Rise 'n Shine"	6:23
14.	"Everything Under the Sun: II. Am I Ever Gonna Change"	6:56
15.	"Everything Under the Sun: III. Who Cares?"	8:19

Notes

- "Peacemaker Die" is not included on the Korean edition.
- "Don't Leave Me Alone" is available exclusively on the vinyl and cassette editions of the album, appearing between "God Isn't Dead?" and "Everything Under the Sun", as well as on the Extragraffitti compilation album (3-CD edition), "Tragic Comic" single, "Stop the World" single, and as a separate promotional single.
- On some CD editions of III Sides to Every Story, the tracks comprising the "Everything Under the Sun" arc were indexed and played as one track, whereas on others they are indexed separately (albeit with no break in the music between tracks). Running times are therefore listed for the combined track and for the separated tracks.

== Personnel ==
Extreme

- Gary Cherone – vocals, art direction
- Nuno Bettencourt – guitar, keyboards, piano, organ, percussion, orchestration, vocals, producer
- Pat Badger – bass, backing vocals
- Paul Geary – drums, percussion, backing vocals

Additional musicians

- Geremy Miller – violin
- Thor (Steven) Sigurdson – cello
- Mike Moran – orchestral arrangements ("Everything Under the Sun: III. Who Cares?")
- John Preziosa, Jr. – rap ("Cupid's Dead")
- Chicolini Bros. (Carl, Jim, Nuno) – music box

Voices

- Sgt. Philip Meyers – "Warientation" intro ("Warheads")
- Alex Andon – boy ("Warheads")
- Avery Andon – boy ("Rest in Peace")
- Ian O'Malley – newsman ("Cupid's Dead")
- Martin Luther King Jr. – speech ("Peacemaker Die")
- Dr. Edward de R. Cayia – priest ("Am I Ever Gonna Change")

Production

- Bob St. John – co-producer, engineer
- John Kurlander, Carl Nappa – engineers
- Bob Ludwig – mastering at Masterdisk, New York
- Liz Vap – art direction, design
- Michael Lavine – photography

== Charts ==
Chart (1992)	Peak position
Australian Albums (ARIA)	42
Austrian Albums (Ö3 Austria)	27
Canada Top Albums/CDs (RPM)	10
Dutch Albums (Album Top 100)	13
Finnish Albums (The Official Finnish Charts)	3
French Albums (SNEP)	29
German Albums (Offizielle Top 100)	20
Japanese Albums (Oricon)	5
New Zealand Albums (RMNZ)	12
Norwegian Albums (VG-lista)	17
Swedish Albums (Sverigetopplistan)	14
Swiss Albums (Schweizer Hitparade)	14
UK Albums (Official Charts)	2
US Billboard 200	10

== Certifications ==
Region	Certification	Certified units/sales
Canada (Music Canada)	Platinum	100,000^{^}
Japan (RIAJ)	Gold	100,000^{^}
United Kingdom (BPI)	Gold	100,000^{^}
United States (RIAA)	Gold	500,000^{^}
^{^} Shipments figures based on certification alone.
