= Show and Tell (Silvertide album) =

Studio album by Silvertide
- Released: September 28, 2004 (U.S.)
- Genre: Hard rock, blues rock, post-grunge
- Length: 44:59
- Label: J Records
- Producer: Oliver Leiber

Silvertide chronology
American Excess (2003)	Show and Tell (2004)

Professional ratings
Review scores
Source	Rating
Allmusic	2.5/5 stars
PopMatters	(Favorable)

Show and Tell (also known as Show & Tell) is the American band Silvertide's full-length debut album. Produced by Oliver Leiber and mixed by Kevin "Caveman" Shirley, the band released it on September 28, 2004. Show and Tell features a melodic hard rock style deliberately reminiscent of the aggressive work done by groups achieving prominence in the 1970s and 1980s, examples being AC/DC, Aerosmith, and Led Zeppelin.

It was distributed by the label J Records. A commercial success, the album spawned multiple top 20 singles, and it's noted for including the band's 'signature song': the strident arena rock track "Ain't Comin' Home". The group created a music video featuring a straight performance of the song, emphasizing frontman Walt Lafty's aggressive style.

== Background and inspiration ==
Members of the band experienced a surprisingly rapid rise to prominence, being signed a major record label when the musicians were still in their teens. They honed their particular sound by touring various nightclubs and other establishments in working-class areas of their native Philadelphia, Pennsylvania. In terms of guitar work, Silvertide member Nick Perri took influence from the strident playing of Angus Young from the group AC/DC. That band also provided direct inspiration for other parts of the sound of Show and Tell. Some tracks call back to the glam metal movement, with the song "California Rain" explicitly mentioning in its lyrics the Sunset Strip area of Los Angeles.

Record producer Oliver Leiber shares multiple songwriting credits on the release. He had previously produced work by pop and rock n roll artists such as BBMak, Boomkat, The Corrs, The Knack, The Troys, and Youngstown in the 2000s. He started out as a member of the funk and soul group Ta Mara & the Seen in the 1980s.

== Reviews and responses ==
The album was a commercial success, with three singles becoming top 20 rock hits on the charts done by Billboard magazine. Lead single "Ain't Comin' Home", which is also the first track on the album, has become known as Silvertide's 'signature song'. The group additionally created a music video featuring a straight performance of the track.

Mixed to positive reviews have come in from various publications such as Allmusic and PopMatters. Writing for the latter, music critic Michael Franco particularly praised the work of frontman Walt Lafty, remarking that the singer's "voice is full of nasty blue-eyed soul, strutting and tearing and shuffling at will." He also stated that Lafty's "phrasing also displays a cocksure aplomb mastered by only a few legends" as the vocalist "knows that delivering a lyric is as important as the actual words."

Richie Unterberger, writing for Allmusic, argued that the release "doesn't boast hooks on the order" of the band's influences, labeling the album as "unexceptional". However, he stated as well that the group provided some positive variety, with several songs being on the slower side, and stated that Silvertide had the "aggressive" vibe of previous bands "down cold". While giving a mixed review, Unterberger additionally compared the vocals to that of Robert Plant, the frontman of band Led Zeppelin.

Some retrospective commentary stated that the band seemed to have peaked too early, particularly given the teenage status of multiple band members. After the group's later break-up and reconciliation years later, Lafty and other members stated that they mostly agreed. However, they still felt as if the album captured their aggressive sound.

== Track listing ==
1. "Ain't Comin' Home" – 4:04
2. "Devil's Daughter" – 3:51
3. "S.F.C." – 4:04
4. "California Rain" – 3:52
5. "Blue Jeans" – 3:09
6. "Mary Jayne" – 3:53
7. "Heartstrong" – 4:17
8. "To See Where I Hide" – 3:54
9. "You Want It All" – 3:26
10. "Nothing Stays" – 5:00
11. "Foxhole J.C." – 5:23

B-sides

1. "Adult Child" - Japanese Bonus Track
2. "Beware" - American Excess [EP] (2002)

Unreleased Demos

1. "Show And Tell" (2002)
2. "Dragonfly" (2002)
3. "Jet Lag" (2002)
4. "Things are Gonna Change" (2002)
5. "Pretty Lady" (2002)
6. "She Looked Away" (2002)

== Singles ==
Year	Title	Chart position
Year	Title	U.S. Mainstream Rock
2004	"Ain't Comin' Home"	6
2004	"California Rain"	—
2005	"Blue Jeans"	12
2005	"Devil's Daughter"	18

== See also ==
- 2004 in music
- Kevin Shirley production discography
