= Exit Elvis =

Studio album by Tribe of Judah
- Released: October 22, 2002
- Genre: Industrial rock
- Length: 40:26
- Label: Spitfire

Professional ratings
Review scores
Source	Rating
Allmusic	3.5/5 stars

Exit Elvis is the first and only album by Tribe of Judah. It was the first full-length album by Gary Cherone after leaving Van Halen.

The sound of the album is described as a mix between hard rock, industrial and electronica with a major use of keyboards and synthesizers. The album also features former Extreme members Pat Badger (bass) and Mike Mangini (drums). At least one track, "Left for Dead", was written by Cherone while in Van Halen, to be used in VH's next album with him (which never happened due to Cherone's departure).

== Track listing ==
1. "Left for Dead" – 4:01
2. "No One" – 3:20
3. "East of Paradise" – 4:06
4. "Thanks for Nothing" – 3:58
5. "Celibate" – 3:49
6. "Ambiguous Headdress" – 5:10
7. "In My Dreams" – 3:34
8. "2+2" – 0:42
9. "Suspension of Disbelief" – 3:16
10. "My Utopia (Anthropolemic)" – 3:15
11. "Exit Elvis" – 6:35

== Personnel ==
- Gary Cherone – lead vocals
- Pat Badger – bass (1, 2, 4, 9, 11)
- Mike Mangini – drums (1–4, 9, 11)
- Leo Mellace – guitar (1–4, 6, 9, 11)
- Tim Bissonnette – guitar (1, 5, 7, 9, 10)
- Markus Cherone – guitar (5, 7, 10)
- Mangone – acoustic guitar (3)
- Steve Ferlazzo – keyboards (1, 2, 4–7, 9, 10) and programming (1, 4, 5, 7, 9, 10)
- Steve Catizone – keyboards, programming & production (2, 3, 6, 11)
- Perry Geyer – programming (3, 7, 10)
- Kum Kum – backing vocal (6)
- Kayla Codi – she devil (8)
- Lenny Bradford – acoustic bass (11)
- Bree Greig – backing vocal (11)
- Kay Ishibashi – violin (11)
