= Tragic Comic =

1993 single by Extreme

Single by Extreme

from the album III Sides to Every Story
- Released: January 25, 1993
- Length: 4:45
- Label: A&M
- Songwriters: Nuno Bettencourt, Gary Cherone
- Producers: Nuno Bettencourt, Bob St. John

Extreme singles chronology
"Stop the World" (1992)	"Tragic Comic" (1993)	"Cynical" (1995)

"Tragic Comic" is the third and last single from American rock band Extreme's third studio album, III Sides to Every Story. The song charted in the United Kingdom at number 15, becoming their last single to enter the UK top 40. The artwork for the single is Charlie Chaplin-based.

== Music video ==
The music video, shot in black-and-white, features Gary Cherone clumsily attempting to woo his neighbour, while the other members of the band play instruments on the balcony. The video ends with her falling down an elevator shaft.

== Track listings ==
US single 31458 0117 2

1. "Tragic Comic" (LP version) – 4:44
2. "Help!" (The Beatles cover) – 2:21
3. "Hole Hearted" (Horn mix) – 3:47
4. "Don't Leave Me Alone" – 5:43

UK CD single AMCD 0156 / INT CD single 580 139-2

1. "Tragic Comic" (radio edit) – 4:10
2. "Hole Hearted" (Horn mix)
3. "Rise 'N Shine" (acoustic)
4. "Tragic Comic" (LP version) – 4:45

UK CD single AMCDR0156

1. "Tragic Comic" (radio edit) – 4:10
2. "Help!"
3. "When I'm President" (live)
4. "Tragic Comic" (LP version) – 4:45

Japanese CD single POCM-1024

1. "Tragic Comic" (radio edit) – 4:10
2. "Hole Hearted" (Horn mix)
3. "Rise 'N Shine" (acoustic)
4. "Cupid's Dead" (Horn mix)
5. "When I'm President" (live)
6. "Help!" (The Beatles cover)

== Charts ==
Chart (1993)	Peak position
Canada Top Singles (RPM)	85
Europe (Eurochart Hot 100)	52
UK Singles (Official Charts)	15
