= Ferlazzo =

Ferlazzo is an Italian surname. Notable people with the surname include:

- Alexander Ferlazzo (born 1995), Australian luger
- Steve Ferlazzo (fl. 1998–2018), American keyboard player
