= The Troys =

American musical group

- Origin: California, United States
- Genres: Pop; Post-grunge; Rock n roll
- Years active: 2003–present
- Labels: Elektra
- Members: Anna Troy; Lindsey Troy; Micah Goldman

The Troys is a musical group made up of sisters Anna and Lindsey Troy. Micah Goldman also played bass for the band for a period. The duo are best known for the track "Sorry Song", which came out in July 2003.

== Background and group history ==
Coming out of the Southern California scene, particularly in terms of the independent music played in coffeehouses and other such locations, they made their full studio major label debut with 2003's Massaging Your Ego, which was released by Elektra Records. The duo's pop and post-grunge rock n roll based sound is heavily influenced by the work of the Grateful Dead, a band that the sisters were introduced to by their father. The publication Allmusic has compared them to musician Ani DiFranco.

The group's three-song single Sorry Song/What Do You Do came out on July 22, 2003. It received production work by notable musician Oliver Leiber, who also shares songwriting credits on the release. He produced work by a wide variety of pop and rock n roll artists throughout the 2000s such as BBMak, Boomkat, The Corrs, The Knack, Silvertide, and Youngstown. Leiber started out as a member of the funk and soul group Ta Mara & the Seen in the 1980s.

Although receiving a smattering of attention, the Troys faded into obscurity as the years went on, although attracting a local audience.

== Other 'Troys' ==
The duo of Anna and Lindsey Troy is not to be confused with the 1960s-era sunshine pop band of the same name, which released the 7" vinyl (catalog #406) "Gotta Fit You into My Life"/"Take Care" in 1968 through Tower Records. That group is often known as just "Troys" without the definite article.

== Discography ==
- Sorry Song/What Do You Do (2003)
- Massaging Your Ego (2003)
