= Waiting for the Punchline =

Studio album by Extreme
- Released: January 19, 1995
- Recorded: 1994
- Studios: Criteria Studios (Miami, Florida); Sound Techniques (Boston, Massachusetts)
- Genres: Hard rock; funk rock; alternative metal
- Length: 65.35
- Label: A&M
- Producers: Nuno Bettencourt; Bob St. John

Extreme chronology
III Sides to Every Story (1992)	Waiting for the Punchline (1995)	Saudades de Rock (2008)

Singles from Waiting for the Punchline
- 1. "More than Words" / "Hole Hearted" Released: 1995; 2. "Hip Today" Released: 1995; 3. "Cynical" Released: 1995

Professional ratings
Review scores
Source	Rating
AllMusic	2/5 stars
Collector's Guide to Heavy Metal	7/10
The Daily Vault	B−
Entertainment Weekly	B−

Waiting for the Punchline is the fourth album by American band Extreme, released in 1995. It is known by fans as a distinctively raw-sounding record with a significant influence from grunge, especially when compared to the big production of the two previous albums. Due to its lyrics focused heavily on social matters (ranging from religion to fame) it is often cited as a concept album. It is also the only Extreme record to feature drummer Mike Mangini (on three tracks). It is also the band's last album before their eleven-year hiatus, which lasted from 1996 to 2007. After the album's tour, Extreme disbanded when Bettencourt informed the band that he was leaving to pursue a solo career. After the breakup, singer Gary Cherone joined Van Halen in 1996 as their new singer, but left three years later.

== Track listing ==
All songs written by Gary Cherone & Nuno Bettencourt, except "There Is No God", "Tell Me Something I Don't Know" and "Naked" by Gary Cherone, Nuno Bettencourt & Pat Badger, and "Leave Me Alone" by Gary Cherone, Nuno Bettencourt & Mike Mangini.

No.	Title	Length
1.	"There Is No God"	6:07
2.	"Cynical" (listed as "Cynical Fuck" in the album liner notes only)	4:41
3.	"Tell Me Something I Don't Know"	6:25
4.	"Hip Today"	4:42
5.	"Naked"	5:46
6.	"Midnight Express" (instrumental)	3:58
7.	"Leave Me Alone"	4:47
8.	"No Respect"	3:51
9.	"Evilangelist"	4:49
10.	"Shadow Boxing"	4:34
11.	"Unconditionally"	5:01
12.	"Fair-Weather Faith" (not included on US release)	4:49
13.	"Waiting for the Punchline" (hidden track that follows after several seconds of silence)	6:00

== Personnel ==
Extreme

- Gary Cherone – lead vocals
- Nuno Bettencourt – guitars, keyboards, vocals, producer
- Pat Badger – bass guitar, backing vocals
- Paul Geary – drums (except "Hip Today", "Leave Me Alone" and "No Respect")
- Mike Mangini – drums on "Hip Today", "Leave Me Alone" and "No Respect"

Production

- Bob St. John – co-producer, engineer
- Carl Nappa, Chris Carrol, Chris Nix, Michael Thompson, Scott Perry, Steve Robillard – assistant engineers
- Bob Ludwig – mastering at Gateway Mastering Studios, Portland, Maine

== Charts ==
Chart (1995)	Peak position
Australian Albums (ARIA)	51
Austrian Albums (Ö3 Austria)	37
Canada Top Albums/CDs (RPM)	30
Dutch Albums (Album Top 100)	65
Finnish Albums (The Official Finnish Charts)	13
French Albums (SNEP)	10
German Albums (Offizielle Top 100)	46
Japanese Albums (Oricon)	4
Scottish Albums (Official Charts)	15
Swedish Albums (Sverigetopplistan)	29
Swiss Albums (Schweizer Hitparade)	24
UK Albums (Official Charts)	10
UK Rock & Metal Albums (Official Charts)	1
US Billboard 200	40

== Certifications ==
Region	Certification	Certified units/sales
Japan (RIAJ)	Gold	100,000^{^}
^{^} Shipments figures based on certification alone.
