= Hip Today =

Single by Extreme

from the album Waiting for the Punchline
- Released: February 27, 1995
- Length: 4:42
- Label: A&M
- Songwriters: Nuno Bettencourt, Gary Cherone
- Producers: Nuno Bettencourt, Bob St. John

Extreme singles chronology
"Cynical" (1995)	"Hip Today" (1995)	"Star" (2008)

"Hip Today" is the second and final single from American rock band Extreme's fourth studio album, Waiting for the Punchline (1995). It was the last single the band released before breaking up and reforming in 2007. It is their last single to chart in the UK, peaking at number 44. In Australia, "Hip Today" reached number 99.

== Track listing ==
1. "Hip Today" (edit) (Bettencourt, Cherone) – 4:17
2. "There Is No God" (edit) (Bettencourt, Cherone, Badger) – 4:26
3. "When I'm President" (live) (Bettencourt, Cherone) – 5:37
4. "Strutter" (Kiss cover) (Stanley, Simmons) – 4:40
