= Satellite Party =

American band (2004–2008)

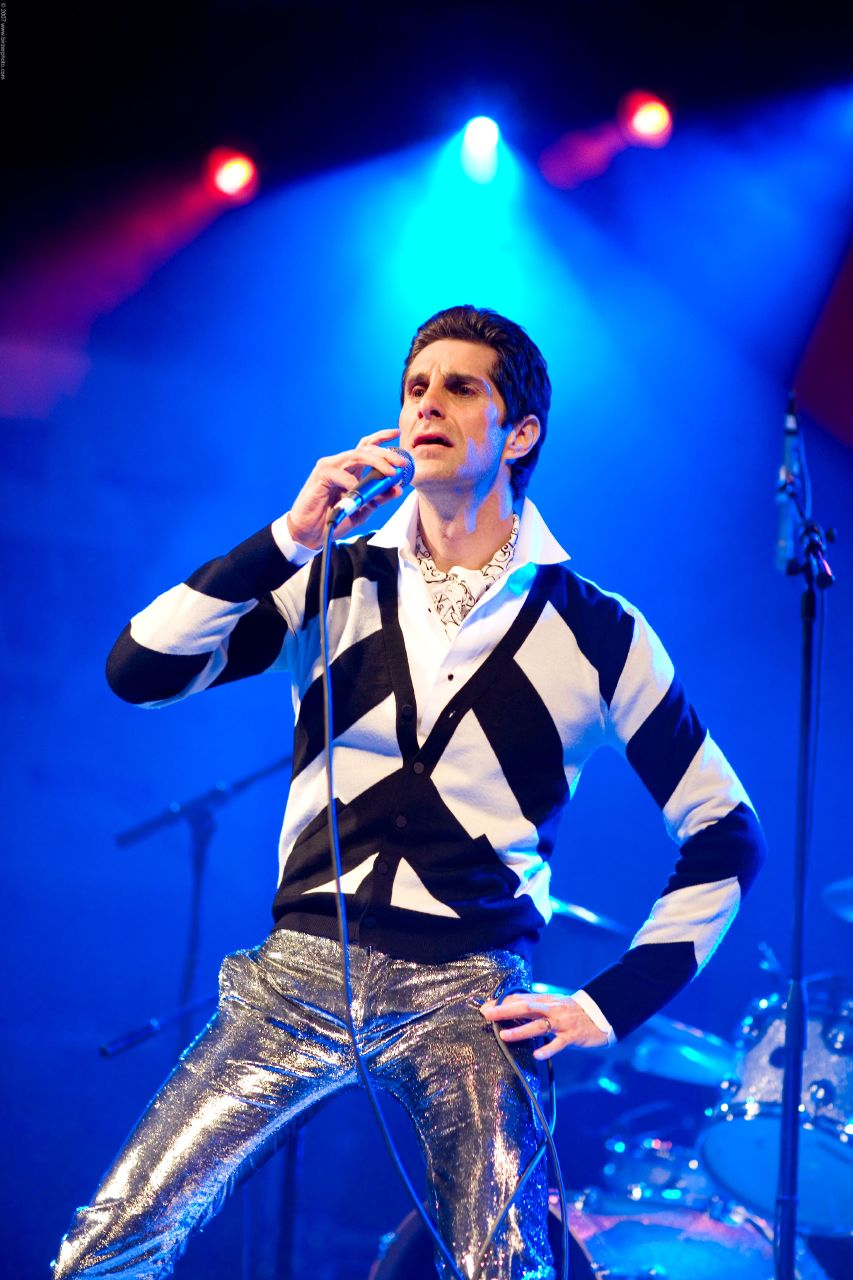
- Perry Farrell and Satellite Party at SXSW 2007

Background information
- Origin: United States
- Genres: Alternative rock, electronica
- Years active: 2004–2008
- Label: Columbia
- Past members: Perry Farrell (vocals); Carl Restivo (bass); Etty Lau Farrell (backing vocals); Nuno Bettencourt (guitar); Kevin Figueiredo (drums)

Satellite Party was an alternative rock band formed by Jane's Addiction vocalist Perry Farrell following the break-up of Jane's Addiction in 2004. Other members included Carl Restivo (bass) and Farrell's wife, Etty Lau Farrell (backing singer and dancer). The band was initially formed as a collaboration between Farrell and Extreme member Nuno Bettencourt. Bettencourt departed from the project in July 2007.

The band released one studio album in 2007, Ultra Payloaded. Satellite Party dissolved in 2008, following Jane's Addiction's decision to reunite on a full-time basis.

== History ==
The group made its debut appearance in Los Angeles at the Key Club on July 18, 2005. Tony Kanal of No Doubt filled in on bass and Steve Ferlazzo of DramaGods was on keyboards. This was followed by an additional performance at Lollapalooza 2005, held in Grant Park in downtown Chicago on July 24, 2005. .

The band's debut album, Ultra Payloaded, was released on May 29, 2007, with contributions from artists such as John Frusciante and Flea of the Red Hot Chili Peppers, Fergie of The Black Eyed Peas, electronic dance pioneers Hybrid and Joy Division/New Order bassist Peter Hook. The group has been signed with Columbia Records, which is a part of Sony Records, since June 6, 2006.

The album includes a "lost song" titled "Woman in the Window" with vocals by the late Doors frontman Jim Morrison. The album itself was preceded by the single, 'Wish Upon a Dog Star,' under the collaboration with Hybrid's lead track off their I Choose Noise LP, "Dogstar."

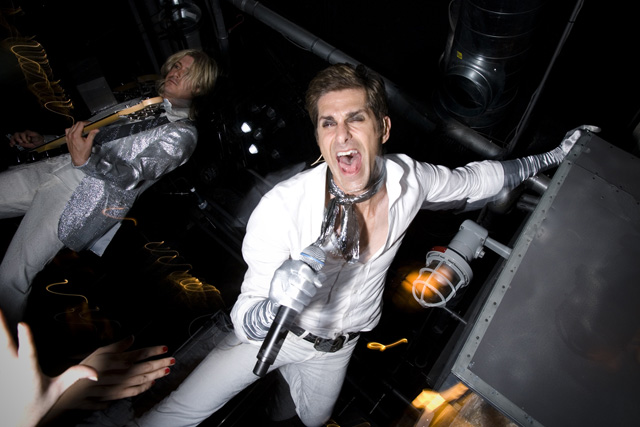
Satellite Party performing in August 2007.

In late July 2007, guitarist Nuno Bettencourt left the band, stating, "I have always felt uncomfortable with the direction of the lineup and live show. I truly do believe in the songs and music on the album, and I wish Perry Farrell and any musician that remains on tour all the best." Drummer Kevin Figueiredo also left to join Nuno in reuniting Boston Hard Rock Band Extreme. Silvertide guitarist, Nick Perri, and drummer, Jordan Plonsky, joined the band for the remainder of the tour.

The band later parted ways with Columbia Records, and began working on new material. However, in 2008, Farrell reunited with Jane's Addiction putting Satellite Party on indefinite hiatus.

In 2012, Farrell discussed his aborted plans for a Satellite Party play, stating, "I was actually working on something, a project a couple of years ago, that was actually a Satellite Party. It had to do with The Doors. I even got to produce a song, a previous unproduced and unrecorded song, by The Doors, and I wanted to do this beautiful play called "The Satellite Party" in Vegas. It didn't work out."

== Band members ==
- Perry Farrell – lead vocals (2004–2008)
- Etty Lau Farrell - backing vocals (2004–2008)
- Nuno Bettencourt - guitar (2004–2007)
- Kevin Figueiredo - drums (2005–2007)
- Carl Restivo – bass, guitar (2007–2008)

=== Live members ===
- Nick Perri - guitar (2007)
- Jordan Plosky - drums (2007)
- Jenny Galt - keyboards (2007)
- Tony Kanal - bass (2005)
- Steve Ferlazzo - keyboards (2005)

== Discography ==
- Ultra Payloaded (2007)

=== Singles ===
- "Wish Upon a Dog Star" (2007) Modern Rock Tracks #26, Hot Dance Club Play #18
- "Hard Life Easy" (2008)

=== Videos ===
Year	Song	Director
2007	"Wish Upon a Dog Star"	Ben Dickinson
