= Nick Perri =

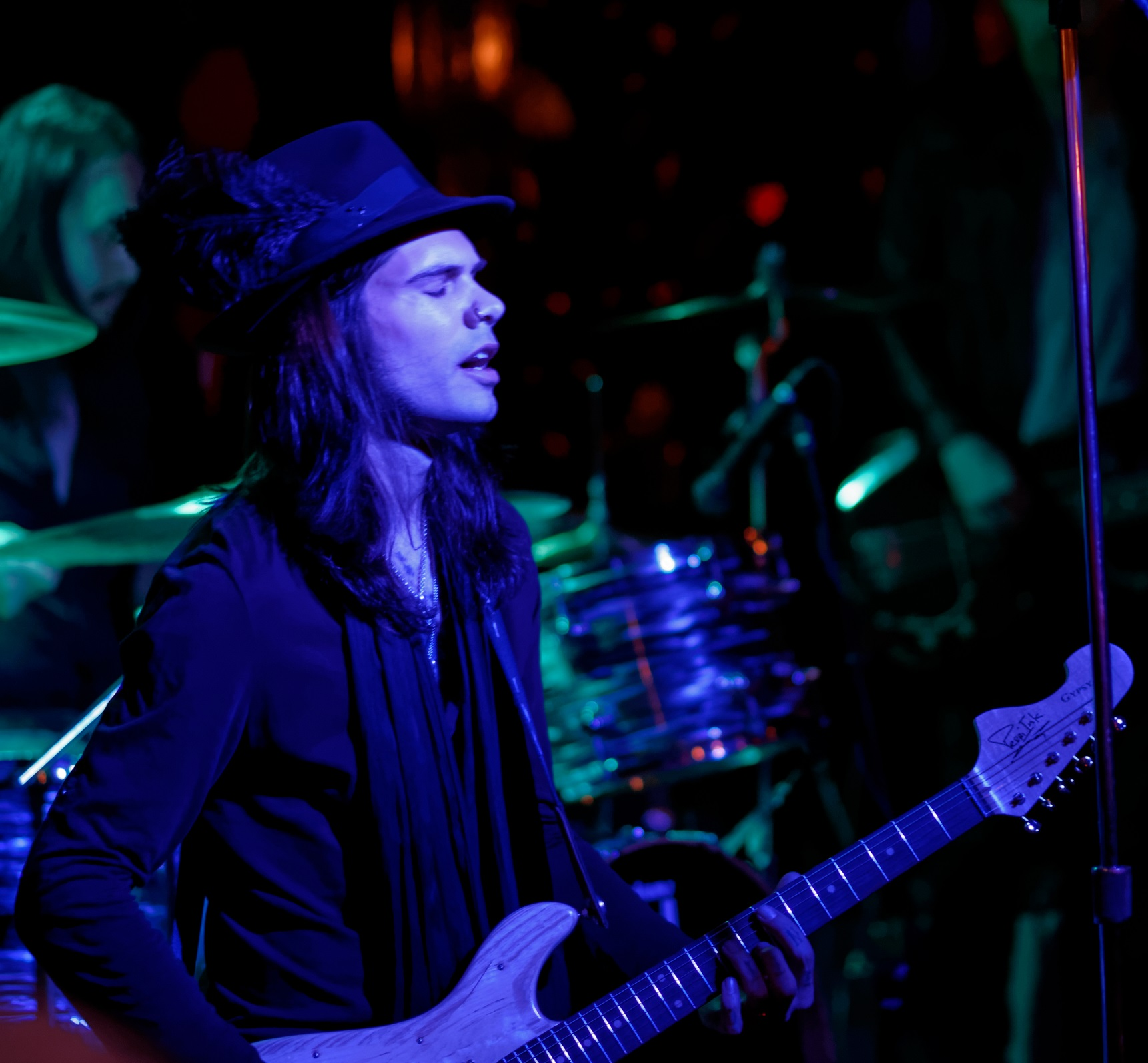
- Perri in 2014

Background information
- Born: Nicholas Perri; May 15, 1984 (age 42); Bensalem, Pennsylvania, U.S.
- Genres: Blues rock; psychedelic rock; Americana; hard rock; alternative rock
- Occupations: Musician; singer; songwriter; producer
- Instruments: Guitar; vocals; bass; keyboards
- Years active: 2001–present
- Member of: Nick Perri & The Underground Thieves
- Formerly of: Silvertide; Mount Holly; SINAI; Shinedown; Dorothy
- Relatives: Christina Perri (Sister)

Nicholas Perri (born May 15, 1984) is an American musician, singer, songwriter, and producer. He is frontman for Philadelphia rock group Nick Perri & The Underground Thieves, as well as founding member of previous groups Silvertide, Mount Holly, and SINAI. Perri has also played for Perry Farrell, Matt Sorum, younger sister Christina Perri, Jimmy Gnecco, Shinedown, Dorothy, and others.

Perri is a platinum-selling songwriter, and in 2016, produced a Transformers compilation album for Hasbro and Sony. In addition, Perri has placed music in movies, TV shows, and commercials including advertisements for the NHL, the WB Network, Theraflu, Squarespace, and others. He appeared and performed in the M. Night Shyamalan film Lady in the Water, and provided two songs to the film's soundtrack.

Perri is one of the faces of Gibson Guitars, having debuted their 60th Anniversary 1959 Gibson Les Paul.

== Personal life ==
Perri is the son, and older child of Mary and Dante Perri. He grew up in Bensalem, Pennsylvania, a Philadelphia suburb with his parents and younger sister, singer-songwriter Christina Perri. He attended Father Judge High School and Bensalem High School and was involved in the theater department. In his junior year, he had the starring role in The King and I. He married Misi Bauman in 2011, and their daughter, Tesla, was born in 2014.

== Career ==
In 2001, Perri co-founded the Philadelphia-based blues-rock group, Silvertide. They released their first EP American Excess in 2002. Their first full album, Show and Tell, was released in 2004. After completion of their debut album in 2003, Silvertide toured straight until 2006, with bands such as Van Halen, Velvet Revolver, and Mötley Crüe.

Following the disbanding of Silvertide, Perri moved back to Los Angeles in 2007 and picked up a role as lead guitarist for Perry Farrell. After touring and playing with Farrell and Satellite Party for a year he left the group and took another lead guitarist role with the modern rock band Shinedown. He stayed with them from 2008 through 2009 touring in support of The Sound of Madness.

In 2009, Perri began a stint with drummer Matt Sorum. Perri and Sorum played throughout the year in Los Angeles and Las Vegas with a group called The Darling Stilettos.

In 2010 Perri moved back to Philadelphia, and with former Silvertide frontman Walt Lafty started a new rock band called Sinai. They spent over a year writing and recording music, and in February 2012, announced a full-length album was finally on the way. The record, entitled A Pinch of Chaos, was released on April 1, 2012.

After taking some time off to grow his custom guitar business Perri returned to the stage in 2014 with The Nick Perri Group for a string of East and West coast shows with friend Jimmy Gnecco. On March 3, 2015, it was announced that the Nick Perri Group had changed its name to Mount Holly.

After two and a half years together, Mount Holly singer Jameson Burt announced he was leaving the band via social media on November 2, 2017. The remaining members followed up saying in Jameson's absence, they would be bringing the band to a close. Mount Holly's full-length album "Stride By Stride" was released Nov 3rd 2017 and entered the TOP 40 on the iTunes Alternative Music charts, peaking at #32.

Starting in the summer of 2018 (through winter 2019) Perri was touring with female rock artist Dorothy, filling in for guitarist Owen Barry who recently had a baby.

In 2019 Perri also become one of the new faces of Gibson Guitars, having debuted their 60th Anniversary 1959 Gibson Les Paul.

On January 4, 2018, Nick unveiled his new group The Underground Thieves, who released their first single "Graveyard Moon" on January 26. The band later changed their name to Nick Perri & The Underground Thieves and in 2020 announced their debut LP, Sun Via.

This version of the group consisted of Perri on vocals and guitar, singers/songwriters Anthony and Michael Montesano, bassist Brian Weaver, keyboardist/songwriter Justin DiFebbo, and drummer Zil Fessler, all of whom originate from Philadelphia.

Sun Via was released on August 14, 2020, and debuted at #6 on the iTunes rock albums charts.

The band’s first single “Feeling Good” hit number #45 on the US rock radio charts and earned acclaim from industry contemporaries. The band spent the remainder of 2020 performing a series of Live Streaming events, and outdoor concerts with The Struts, and Blackberry Smoke. In 2021 they re-joined Blackberry Smoke for a run of shows in Florida, and announced they would be touring through the summer both as a headliner, and co-headliner with Rick Nielsen of Cheap Trick.

On May 20, 2021, the band released its second single and accompanying music video for “I Want You”, and simultaneously announced a partnership with Gibson and Sweetwater Sound to giveaway 100,000 digital copies of their debut record, Sun Via.

At the end of 2021 Nick announced his first solo tour, with support from former Silvertide band member, Walt Lafty.

In January of 2022 now as a 4-piece (excluding the Montesano Bros) the band entered Retro City Studios in Philadelphia to record their sophomore album. Nick said in an instagram post that the recordings have yielded a double album, and that it is expected for release in 2023.

On July 13, 2022, the band released a cover of the Neil Young song, "My My Hey Hey".

== Discography ==
=== Albums ===
- Silvertide - American Excess (EP) (2003)
- Silvertide - Show and Tell (2004)
- Lady In The Water - Soundtrack (2006)
- Shinedown - The Sound of Madness (2008)
- Christina Perri - The Ocean Way Sessions (2010)
- Christina Perri - Lovestrong (2011)
- SINAI - A Pinch of Chaos (2012)
- Nick Perri - Sink or Swim (2012)
- Christina Perri - A Very Merry Perri Christmas (EP) (2012)
- Transformers - Roll Out (2016)
- Mount Holly - Stride By Stride (2017)
- The Underground Thieves + Friends - The Capistrano EP (2018)
- Nick Perri & The Underground Thieves - Sun Via (2020)

=== Singles ===
Year	Title	Chart positions	Album
Year	Title	US Mainstream Rock	Album
2004	"Ain't Comin' Home"	6	Show and Tell
2004	"California Rain"	—	Show and Tell
2005	"Blue Jeans"	12	Show and Tell
2005	"Devil's Daughter"	18	Show and Tell
