= DramaGods =

American rock band

- Also known as: Population 1
- Origin: United States
- Genres: Alternative rock
- Years active: 2002–2007
- Past members: Nuno Bettencourt; Joe Pessia; Steve Ferlazzo; Kevin Figueiredo

DramaGods (formerly known as Population 1) was a rock band led by Extreme guitarist Nuno Bettencourt.

The band originally started when Bettencourt released the album Population 1 in 2002 (late 2001 in Japan). On the album, he recorded all the instruments on most of the tracks. When he decided to go on tour to support the album, he formed a touring band with Joe Pessia on rhythm guitar, Steve Ferlazzo on keyboards and back-up vocals, Philip Bynoe on bass and Kevin Figueiredo on drums. Later Phil left and Joe took the role of bassist. In 2004, while still under the moniker of Population 1, they released an EP titled Sessions from Room 4.

In 2005, due to legal issues, Bettencourt dropped the name Population 1 and changed it to DramaGods with the same lineup.

DramaGods released their debut effort Love in December 2005, available as an import via Victor Entertainment (Japan). The band then made their record available as a digital download on iTunes in early 2006.

The band toured in Japan, where they appeared at the Udo Music Festival along with Kiss, Santana, Jeff Beck, The Doobie Brothers, Alice in Chains, The Pretenders, Ben Folds Five, and others in July 2006 shortly after Bettencourt took part in a three-date reunion tour with Extreme in New England.

In the autumn of 2006, DramaGods contributed their song "S'OK" to the album project Artists for Charity – Guitarists 4 the Kids, produced by Slang Productions to assist World Vision Canada in helping underprivileged kids in need.

In early 2007 DramaGods started to dissolve when Nuno, Steve and Kevin became a part of Perry Farrell's musical venture Satellite Party which released one record (Ultra Payloaded). During the subsequent tour, they ended up quitting the band by July 2007 when Nuno and Gary Cherone reformed Extreme, making it a definitive reunion. Steve Ferlazzo went on to play with Avril Lavigne.

== Band members ==
- Nuno Bettencourt – vocals, guitar, bass, keyboards, piano, drums
- Steve Ferlazzo – keyboards, synthesizer, piano, backing vocals
- Joe Pessia – bass
- Kevin Figueiredo – drums

== Discography ==
Studio albums

- Population 1 (2002)
- Love (2005)
