= Tribe of Judah (band) =

American industrial rock band

- Origin: Boston, Massachusetts, U.S.
- Genres: Industrial rock
- Years active: 2001–2003
- Label: Spitfire
- Past members: Gary Cherone; Steve Ferlazzo; Mike Mangini; Pat Badger; Leo Mellace

Tribe of Judah was an American industrial rock band formed by vocalist Gary Cherone after his brief 1998 stint with Van Halen.

Tribe of Judah featured musicians Cherone had worked with in the band Extreme: bassist Pat Badger and drummer Mike Mangini. An eponymous EP was released in 2001 and a full-length album was released in late 2002.

Tribe of Judah is different from Cherone's other work as it features a more industrial/electronic sound. At least one song, "Left for Dead", was (supposedly) slated to be a track on a follow-up Van Halen album which would have featured Cherone.

== Discography ==
=== Studio albums ===
- Exit Elvis (2002)

=== Extended plays ===
- East of Paradise (2001)

== Members ==
- Gary Cherone – vocals
- Steve Ferlazzo – keyboards
- Mike Mangini – drums
- Pat Badger – bass, vocals
- Leo Mellace – guitar
