= Ultra Payloaded =

Studio album by Satellite Party
- Released: May 29, 2007
- Recorded: 2005–2007
- Genre: Alternative rock, electronica
- Length: 47:50
- Label: Columbia
- Producer: Perry Farrell, Nuno Bettencourt (co-producer), Steve Lillywhite executive producer

Singles from Album
- 1. "Wish Upon a Dog Star" Released: 2007; 2. "Hard Life Easy" Released: 2008

Professional ratings
Review scores
Source	Rating
Allmusic	link
Kerrang	4/5 stars
Metacritic	59/100 link
Music Box	link
NME	link
Q	3/5 stars
Rolling Stone	link

Ultra Payloaded is the only studio album by American alternative rock band Satellite Party, released on May 29, 2007, on Columbia Records. Co-produced by Perry Farrell and Nuno Bettencourt, the album was preceded by the single, "Wish Upon a Dog Star".

The album features contributions from artists such as John Frusciante and Flea of the Red Hot Chili Peppers, Fergie of The Black Eyed Peas, former Red Hot Chili Peppers and Pearl Jam drummer Jack Irons, Joy Division/New Order bass guitarist Peter Hook, Porno for Pyros guitarist Peter DiStefano, Hybrid, Thievery Corporation, and finally a pre-recorded vocal performance provided by Jim Morrison. There is also a 30 piece orchestra on four of the tracks, led by Harry Gregson-Williams. The full album was leaked on May 22.

The album entered the charts at #91 on the Billboard 200 with about 8,000 copies sold.

The full album, with the exception of "Nightbloom", was included on Farrell's boxset "The Glitz; The Glamour", released on January 22, 2021. Therefore, it was also released on digital streaming platforms such as Spotify.

== Track listing ==
1. "Wish Upon a Dog Star" (featuring Hybrid) – 4:45 (Farrell, Healings, Hook, Truman)
2. "Only Love, Let's Celebrate" – 3:50 (Farrell, Ferakis, Zesses)
3. "Hard Life Easy" – 4:13 (Farrell, Frusciante, Flea)
4. "Kinky" (featuring Hybrid) – 4:01 (Farrell, Healings, Hook, Truman)
5. "The Solutionists" (featuring Thievery Corporation) – 4:23 (Farrell, Thievery Corporation)
6. "Awesome" (featuring Hybrid) – 4:26 (Farrell, Healings, Truman)
7. "Mr. Sunshine" – 4:20 (Farrell, The Bee Gees)
8. "Insanity Rains" – 3:28 (Farrell, Bettencourt)
9. "Milky Ave" – 4:28 (Farrell, Flea)
10. "Ultra Payloaded Satellite Party" – 5:27 (Farrell)
11. "Woman in the Window" (featuring Jim Morrison) – 4:00 (Farrell)
12. "Nightbloom" (iTunes bonus track) – 4:12 (Farrell)

== Personnel ==
- Perry Farrell – lead vocals, programming (2, 3, 5, 7, 9–11), string arrangement (3)
- Nuno Bettencourt – lead guitar (1–10), bass guitar (2, 5, 7, 8, 10, 11), keyboards (2, 3, 4, 8, 9), string arrangement (3, 6, 9), organ and piano (11), backing vocals
- Kevin Figueiredo – drums
- Etty Lau Farrell – backing vocals
- Carl Restivo – backing vocals (8, 10), additional 808 programming, bass guitar (live)
- Peter DiStefano – acoustic guitar (1, 4, 6)
- John Frusciante – guitar (3)
- Flea – bass guitar (3, 9)
- Peter Hook – bass guitar (1, 4)
- Fergie – backing vocals (1, 10)
- Hybrid – programming (1, 4, 6)
- Thievery Corporation – programming (5)
- Jim Morrison – vocals (11)
- Jack Irons – drums (uncredited)
- Harry Gregson-Williams – string arrangement, conducting (5, 6, 7, 10, 11) [The Satellite Strings Orchestra]
- Suze DeMarchi – backing vocals (1–3, 5, 8)
- Dan Chase – percussion (2, 3)
- Joey Heredia – percussion (2, 3, 7, 10)
- Kenneth Crouch – piano (3, 7)
- Milen Kirov – piano (1)
- Jamie Mahoberac – keyboards (3)
- Tim Pierce – guitars (5)
- Anthony J. Resta – programming
- Daniel Sternbaum – engineering
- Scott Wiley – engineering (1, 2, 6, 7, 9, 10)
- Anthony "Rocky" Gallo – engineering and mixing (1–3, 11), additional tracking (11)
