= Star (Extreme song) =

Single by Extreme

from the album Saudades de Rock
- Released: July 8, 2008
- Recorded: 2007–2008
- Genre: Heavy metal, hard rock
- Length: 4:13 (Star); 13:22 (CD single)
- Label: Fontana
- Songwriter(s): Nuno Bettencourt, Gary Cherone
- Producer(s): Nuno Bettencourt

Extreme singles chronology
"Hip Today" (1995)	"Star" (2008)

"Star" was the first single off Extreme's fifth studio album Saudades de Rock. It was the band's first single after the reunion of the band in 2007 after a thirteen-year hiatus. The song was first released to the band's Myspace page and then on a single promo CD.

The song features a return to the band's classic hard rock style from their first three albums, before the departure to a more grunge driven music. The song has a very upbeat funk metal riff from guitarist Nuno Bettencourt and harmony vocals done by Bettencourt and Cherone in the chorus.

The single features two versions of the song "Ghost" (also from the new album) as a B-side.

== Track listing ==
1. "Star" - 4:13
2. "Ghost" (Radio edit) - 4:10
3. "Ghost" (Album version) - 4:59
