= Love (DramaGods album) =

Studio album by DramaGods
- Released: December 16, 2005
- Genre: Alternative rock Hard rock
- Length: 73:49
- Label: JVC Victor (Japan)
- Producer: Bruno Graffiti (Nuno Bettencourt)

DramaGods chronology
Sessions from Room 4 (2004)	Love (2005)

Professional ratings
Review scores
Source	Rating
Allmusic	

Love is the only studio album from DramaGods, a project led by guitarist Nuno Bettencourt. Bettencourt is most remembered for being the guitarist in the band Extreme. Originally conceived as a double-album entitled "Love/Hate", the songs were culled into one album to have a better impact on taking listeners on a journey.

The album was originally released by JVC Victor in Japan and is the first released by the band under the name DramaGods. The band was previously known as Population 1, but changed the name due to legal issues.

The song 'Interface' was later re-recorded for Extreme's album Saudades de Rock.

== Track listing ==
1. Megaton (Bettencourt, Pessia, Ferlazzo, Figueiredo)
2. Lockdown (Bettencourt)
3. Bury You (Bettencourt, Burns)
4. Broken (Bettencourt)
5. Pilots (Bettencourt, Figueiredo, Pessia)
6. Interface (Bettencourt)
7. Heavy (Bettencourt, Pessia, Ferlazzo, Figueiredo)
8. Something About You (Bettencourt)
9. Fearless Leader (Bettencourt, Pessia)
10. Sometimes (Bettencourt, Ferlazzo, Figueiredo, Pessia)
11. So'k (Bettencourt, Figueiredo)
12. Replay (Bettencourt, Pessia)
13. Nice To Meet You (Bettencourt)
14. Sky (Bettencourt, Ferlazzo)

== Personnel ==
- Nuno Bettencourt — guitars, lead vocals; bass (tracks 4, 12)
- Steve Ferlazzo — keyboards, backing vocals
- Joe Pessia — bass (tracks 1–3, 5–11, 13, 14); mandolin (track 4), slide guitar (track 4), guitar (track 12)
- Kevin Figuereido — drums, backing vocals

Photographer ~ Will Blochinger

== See also ==
- Mourning Widows
