= Silvertide =

American rock band

- Silvertide in the 2000s

Background information
- Origin: Philadelphia, Pennsylvania, U.S.
- Genres: Blues rock; hard rock; post-grunge
- Years active: 2001–2009; 2012–present
- Members: Walt Lafty; Nick Perri; Mark Melchiorre, Jr.; Kevin Frank; Brian Weaver
- Website: silvertideband.com

Silvertide is an American rock band from Philadelphia, Pennsylvania.

== History ==
Originally named Vertigo, Silvertide was formed in January 2001 in Northeast Philadelphia. At first, the band was signed by J Records, and they released their first EP American Excess in 2002. Their first full album, Show and Tell, was released in 2004 and produced by David Ivory.

After completion of their debut album in 2003, Silvertide hit the road and toured straight until 2006, most notably in support of Van Halen, Velvet Revolver, and Mötley Crüe in the summer of 2004, and Alter Bridge in 2005. On March 4, 2005, the band performed their single "Blue Jeans" on an episode of Jimmy Kimmel Live.

In 2006, M. Night Shyamalan featured Silvertide in his film Lady in the Water. Silvertide was featured on the soundtrack with their covers of Bob Dylan's "Maggie's Farm" and "It Ain't Me, Babe".

In February 2006 the band made their second appearance on the cover of Origivation Magazine. The photoshoot took place while the band was in preproduction for their next album.

Silvertide continued to play shows after the temporary departure of lead guitarist and founding member Nick Perri, who hit the road with Perry Farrell, Shinedown, and Matt Sorum. Guitarist "Evil Rob", a long-time friend of the band from the Philadelphia-based band Pepper's Ghost, was called to fill in for Perri on numerous occasions.

Silvertide's future soon came into doubt as news of their new album had slowed down, and the band had updated their Myspace page to show their record label as "We think J Records?" Eventually, a few members of Silvertide began to pursue other projects, including Walt Lafty and Brian Weaver's band Automatic Fire, Walt and Nick Perri's band SINAI, and various solo releases. In 2011, J Records was dissolved into RCA Records, at which time Silvertide was no longer listed on the label's roster.

In October, 2012, Silvertide created a new Facebook page and began posting old band photos, as well as hints of a potential reunion. On November 2, the band posted an announcement saying Silvertide "will be making music in 2013." On January 9, 2013 Silvertide announced on WMMR that they are going to play a reunion show on March 9, 2013 at The TLA and enter the studio sometime after that show. Walt also said during the reunion show that it was being recorded by "Puffy" Dee Miller for Silversound Productions. Cinematographers consisted of Chris Lonergan, George Morgan, Burke Pushman and Bryan Skill. What is being done with the video is unknown at this point. The show on March 9 was the first of a handful of shows the band performed in 2013.

== Other projects ==
January 22, 2009 vocalist Walt Lafty and bassist Brian Weaver of Silvertide started a new band called Automatic Fire with guitarist Evil Rob of the band Peppers Ghost alongside drummer Brian Kilian from the Dave Pittinger Band. In early 2010, Automatic Fire released an EP titled No Decoy. The album featured a song titled "What Are You Made Of", which Silvertide had performed at some of their final shows in 2008. The band was dissolved in September 2010.

In October 2010 it was announced that former Silvertide members Nick Perri and Walt Lafty had reunited for the first time since Silvertide to form the new rock band SINAI. On May 1, 2012, the band released their debut album, A Pinch of Chaos. After this band disbanded, Nick formed the band Mount Holly, which disbanded on November 3, 2017. On January 2, 2018, Nick's latest project, The Underground Thieves, which features Walt and Brian Weaver, was announced.

== Discography ==
=== Albums ===
- American Excess (EP) (2002)
- Show and Tell (2004)

=== Singles ===
Year	Title	Chart Positions	Album
Year	Title	US Mainstream Rock	Album
2004	"Ain't Comin' Home"	6	Show and Tell
2004	"California Rain"	-	Show and Tell
2005	"Blue Jeans"	12	Show and Tell
2005	"Devil's Daughter"	18	Show and Tell
2014	"Try, Try, Try"	-	
