= Rest in Peace (song) =

1992 single by Extreme

Single by Extreme

from the album III Sides to Every Story
- Released: August 24, 1992
- Genre: Hard rock
- Length: 6:02
- Label: A&M
- Songwriters: Nuno Bettencourt; Gary Cherone
- Producers: Nuno Bettencourt; Bob St. John

Extreme singles chronology
"Hole Hearted" (1991)	"Rest in Peace" (1992)	"Stop the World" (1992)

Music video
- "Rest in Peace" on YouTube

"Rest in Peace" is a song by American rock band Extreme. It was released on August 24, 1992, by A&M Records, as the first single from their third studio album, III Sides to Every Story (1992).

== Music video ==
The original music video for the song was inspired by Norman McLaren's short film called Neighbours in which, instead of a flower, the neighbors fight over a TV set showing the band performing the song. The band was sued, but the controversy was quickly settled out of court. They later released a new version of the video, consisting only of the performance montage of the band on a white cyclorama which was displayed on the television set in the original video.

== Chart performance ==
The song reached the US Cash Box Top 100 and Billboard Hot 100 charts, peaking at No. 66 and 96. It also topped Billboard's Mainstream Rock chart in November 1992. In the UK, the song charted at No. 13 on the UK Singles Chart.

== Track listing ==
No.	Title	Length
1.	"Rest in Peace" (LP version)
2.	"Rest in Peace" (radio edit)
3.	"Peacemaker Die"
4.	"Monica"

== Charts ==
=== Weekly charts ===
Chart (1992)	Peak position
Australia (ARIA)	76
Canada Top Singles (RPM)	21
Europe (Eurochart Hot 100)	33
Finland (Suomen virallinen lista)	7
Netherlands (Dutch Top 40)	20
Netherlands (Single Top 100)	31
New Zealand (Recorded Music NZ)	19
Sweden (Sverigetopplistan)	24
Switzerland (Schweizer Hitparade)	20
UK Singles (Official Charts)	13
UK Airplay (Music Week)	17
US Billboard Hot 100	96
US Album Rock Tracks (Billboard)	1
US Cash Box Top 100	66

=== Year-end charts ===
Chart (1992)	Position
US Album Rock Tracks (Billboard)	30

== Release history ==
Region	Date	Format(s)	Label(s)	Ref.
United Kingdom	August 24, 1992	7-inch vinyl; 12-inch vinyl; cassette	A&M	
Japan	September 20, 1992	Mini-CD	A&M	
Australia	September 28, 1992	CD; cassette	A&M	

== See also ==
- List of anti-war songs
