= Extreme (Extreme album) =

Studio album by Extreme
- Released: March 14, 1989
- Recorded: 1988
- Genres: Glam metal; funk metal; hard rock
- Length: 45:00
- Label: A&M
- Producers: Mack, Extreme

Extreme chronology
Extreme (1989)	Extreme II: Pornograffitti (1990)

Singles from Extreme
- 1. "Play with Me" Released: February 1989; 2. "Kid Ego" Released: March 1989; 3. "Little Girls" Released: July 1989; 4. "Mutha (Don't Wanna Go to School Today)" Released: September 1989

Professional ratings
Review scores
Source	Rating
AllMusic	3/5 stars
Collector's Guide to Heavy Metal	6/10
Rolling Stone	3/5 stars

Extreme is the first studio album by the American glam metal band Extreme, released in 1989 by A&M Records. The album reached No. 80 on the Billboard 200, and produced the minor Mainstream Rock hit "Kid Ego". The single "Play with Me" is featured on the soundtrack for the comedy film Bill & Ted's Excellent Adventure, the opening episode of Stranger Things 4, and the 2007 rhythm game, Guitar Hero Encore: Rocks the 80s.

== Music ==
The album has been primarily described as glam metal, but has also been described as funk-metal, and hard rock.

== Reception ==
The album sold modestly well at around 300,000 units, and was favored by heavy metal fans, but did not achieve significant mainstream success. Three of the album's singles, "Little Girls", "Kid Ego", and "Mutha (Don't Wanna Go to School Today)", received medium airplay on Headbangers Ball.

Extreme was met with mixed reception. AllMusic gave the album three stars saying,"Extreme's first album shows the band struggling to shed their influences, particularly Van Halen, and develop a style of their own; consequently, it's wildly uneven, but guitarist Nuno Bettencourt is always worth hearing". In his review for Extreme II: Pornograffitti, Bryan Rolli called their debut album "rote glam metal". Rolling Stone writer Kim Neely gave the album three stars, but called it an "extremely good listen".

== Track listing ==
All songs written by Cherone & Bettencourt, except "Mutha (Don't Wanna Go to School Today)" by Cherone, LeBeaux & Hunt.

No.	Title	Length
1.	"Little Girls"	3:47
2.	"Wind Me Up"	3:37
3.	"Kid Ego"	4:04
4.	"Watching, Waiting"	4:54
5.	"Mutha (Don't Wanna Go to School Today)"	4:52
6.	"Teacher's Pet"	3:02
7.	"Big Boys Don't Cry"	3:34
8.	"Smoke Signals"	4:14
9.	"Flesh 'n' Blood"	3:31
10.	"Rock a Bye Bye"	5:57
11.	"Play with Me" (not present on any vinyl releases except Australia and New Zealand)	3:29
Total length:		45:00

== Personnel ==
- Pat Badger – bass guitar, backing vocals
- Nuno Bettencourt – guitar, synthesizer, piano, backing vocals, percussion, orchestration, mixing
- Gary Cherone – lead & backing vocals, design, logo design
- Paul Geary – drums, percussion, backing vocals, logo design

Additional musicians

- The Lollipop Kids – background vocals (tracks 5, 11)
- Rapheal May – harmonica (track 1)

Production

- Mack – producer on all tracks, except 2, 3 and 4, engineer, mixing
- Bob St. John – engineer, mixing
- Nigel Green – mixing on tracks 2, 3 and 4
- Howie Weinberg – mastering at Masterdisk, New York
- Jeff Gold – art direction
- Harris Savides – photography

== Charts ==
Chart (1989)	Peak position
Australian Albums (Kent Music Report)	97
Billboard 200	80

== Accolades ==
Publication	Year	Country	Accolade	Rank
Guitar World	2008	US	Top 20 Hair Metal Albums of the Eighties	8
