= Extreme (band) =

American rock band

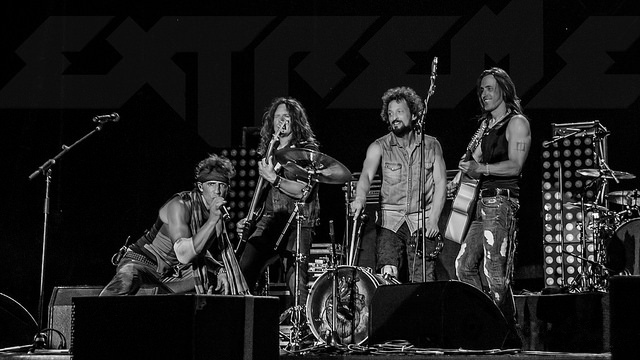
- Extreme performing at Garage Sound Fest, 2017

Background information
- Also known as: The Dream
- Origin: Boston, Massachusetts, U.S.
- Genres: Hard rock; funk metal; glam metal
- Works: Discography
- Years active: 1985–1996; 2007–present (reunions: 2004–2006)
- Labels: A&M; Frontiers
- Spinoffs: DramaGods
- Members: Gary Cherone; Nuno Bettencourt; Pat Badger; Kevin Figueiredo
- Past members: Paul Geary; Mike Mangini; Carl Restivo; Laurent Duval
- Website: extreme-band.com

Extreme is an American rock band formed in Boston, Massachusetts, in 1985, that reached the height of their popularity in the late 1980s and early 1990s. They have released six studio albums, two EPs (in Japan) and two compilation albums since their formation. The band was one of the most successful rock acts of the early 1990s, selling over 10 million albums worldwide.

Extreme achieved its greatest success with their second album Pornograffitti (1990), which peaked at number 10 on the Billboard 200, and was certified gold in May 1991 and double platinum in October 1992. The album featured the acoustic ballad single "More Than Words", which reached No. 1 on the Billboard Hot 100 in the United States.

While Extreme is primarily a hard rock band, their music has combined influences and elements of such genres as glam metal, funk, progressive, and on their fourth album Waiting for the Punchline (1995), alternative metal and grunge.

== History ==
=== 1985–1989: Formation and debut album ===
Extreme was formed in Boston, Massachusetts, in 1985. Vocalist Gary Cherone and drummer Paul Geary were in a band together called "Adrenalin" in 1979. Then they were also members of a band called The Dream, in 1980. CBS Television bought the rights to the name, "The Dream" for a short lived television series called, "Dreams." So, they had to rename the band. Guitarist Nuno Bettencourt was in a band called Sinful, and bassist Pat Badger was playing with a Berklee College-based act called In The Pink. Bettencourt joined Cherone and Geary in a new group in 1985, followed by Badger in 1986. The four chose the name "Extreme" as it sounded like "ex-Dream," a reference to Geary and Cherone's past band, "The Dream." Gary and Nuno crossed paths numerous times as Gary's brother Mark and Nuno's brother Paulo were in a well known local Boston band together called, "Flesh."

Cherone and Bettencourt began writing songs together and the band performed continuously in the New England area. Extreme grew a large regional following and were named "Outstanding Hard Rock/Heavy Metal Act" at the Boston Music Awards in 1986 and 1987.

The band had accumulated several original songs by the time A&R director Bryan Huttenhower signed them to A&M Records in 1987 (which was soon sold to PolyGram in 1988). The band recorded their self-titled debut album which was issued in March 1989. The first single was "Kid Ego", a song that Cherone would later admit made him cringe. The final track on the album, "Play with Me", was used as the "mall chase" song in the film Bill & Ted's Excellent Adventure.

=== 1990–1993: Pornograffitti, III Sides to Every Story, and mainstream success ===
Sales of Extreme's first record were sufficient to support a second release. Michael Wagener, who had previously worked with Dokken and White Lion, was hired to produce the band's Extreme II: Pornograffitti album in 1990.

The record, which showcased Cherone's lyrics, and Bettencourt's guitar-playing, was a mixture of funk, pop and glam metal sounds. "Decadence Dance" and "Get the Funk Out" were released as singles. "Get the Funk Out" reached No. 19 in the UK charts in June 1991. Neither single was initially successful in the United States, however, and the album had fallen off the charts when A&M sent the third single to a number of US radio stations.

The acoustic ballad "More Than Words" entered the Hot 100 on March 23, 1991, at No. 81. It later became a huge smash, hitting No. 1 on the Billboard Hot 100 in the United States. The subsequent single, "Hole Hearted", another acoustic track, was also successful, rising to No. 4 on the same pop chart.

The band began recording their third album in 1992. Their appearance at the Freddie Mercury Tribute Concert in April 1992 interrupted the recording sessions, but it gave the band considerable exposure beyond the heavy metal fraternity. By playing a medley at the tribute, as well as "Love of My Life" and "More Than Words" acoustically, Extreme gained a considerable number of fans along with the Queen fan base. At the introductory speech before they played, Brian May noted that they were "possibly more than any other group on this planet, the people that understand exactly what Queen have been about all these years, and what Freddie was about all these years".

III Sides to Every Story was released on September 22, 1992. The first single from the album, "Rest in Peace", had an accompanying video clip inspired by a film short by the National Film Board of Canada called Neighbours.

=== 1994–1996: Lineup change and Waiting for the Punchline ===
Prior to the band's appearance at Donington's Monsters of Rock festival in the summer of 1994, Geary left the band to pursue a career in artist management. Mike Mangini succeeded him on drums.

Waiting for the Punchline, the first record to feature Mangini on three tracks (Paul Geary played on the rest of the album before departing), was released on February 7, 1995. The singles "Hip Today", "Unconditionally", and "Cynical" were released, but the album was not a commercial sales success. Extreme disbanded after the tour in 1996, on amicable terms, when Bettencourt decided to leave to pursue a solo career.

=== 1997–2003: Split and separate projects ===
On the recommendation of former Extreme manager Ray Danniels, in 1996, Gary Cherone joined one of the world's most successful rock acts, Van Halen. During 1996, Van Halen's fan-base weathered the acrimonious departures of two of rock's most successful lead singers: first David Lee Roth, the band's original frontman (1974-1985), and then Sammy Hagar, who had fronted Van Halen since 1985. Into this fractious, and very public, situation entered Cherone, whom guitarist Eddie Van Halen later called a "musical soulmate". In 1998, the Cherone-fronted Van Halen released Van Halen III.

Van Halen III reached No. 4 on Billboard's top 200 album charts, and sold over 500,000 copies in the U.S. alone; however, by Van Halen's standards, it was a failure. All 12 of their previous albums had all sold over two million copies in the U.S. alone, with two selling over ten million in the U.S. alone—and the previous five studio albums had all reached No. 1 on the Billboard 200 album charts. Van Halen's tour was successful; however, not as successful as in previous years.

In late 1999, after Van Halen's second album with Cherone was "sent back" by Warner Bros. Records, Cherone left the band. He later formed Tribe of Judah, which released an album called Exit Elvis in 2002. In 2005, Cherone released a four-song sampler CD, entitled Need I Say More.

In 1997, Nuno Bettencourt released his first solo album titled Schizophonic. In 1998 he formed a group called Mourning Widows who released a self-titled album that year and a follow-up album, Furnished Souls for Rent, in 2000. Following the breakup of that band, he released another solo album under the project name of Population 1 in 2002. Acquiring new members for the tour, he decided to keep the name Population 1 and the first release as a band was a five-song EP entitled Sessions from Room 4 in 2004. They then changed the band's name to DramaGods and created a follow-up CD entitled Love in 2005. Nuno, along with bandmates Kevin Figueiredo and Steve Ferlazzo, then went on to collaborate with Perry Farrell's project Satellite Party.

The Best of Extreme: An Accidental Collocation of Atoms?, a 13-track Extreme "best-of" collection featuring tracks from the first three studio albums, was released in 1998. Extreme – The Collection, a later collection including 15-tracks from the first four studio albums, was released in 2002.

=== 2004–2010: Reformation and Saudades de Rock ===
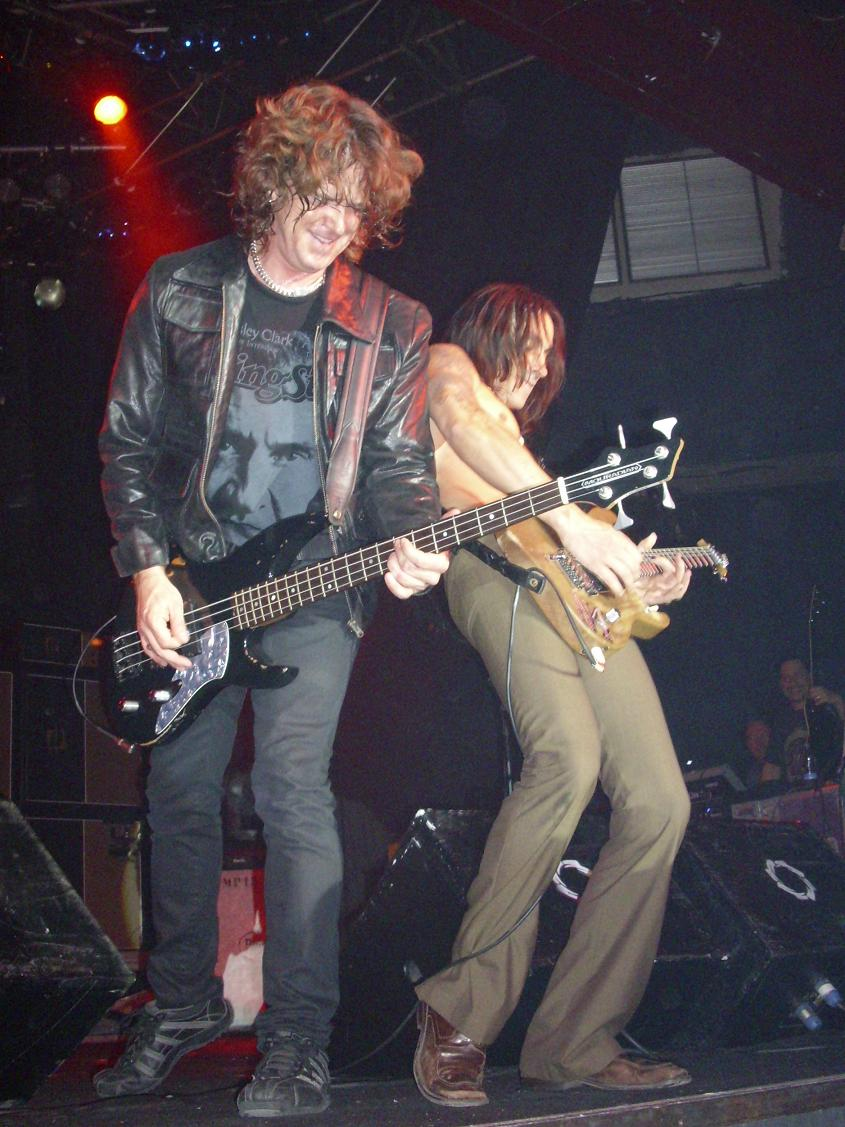
Bassist Pat Badger and guitarist Nuno Bettencourt performing live in 2008. Bettencourt is one of the two constant members of Extreme.

Extreme reformed for a short tour in 2004 playing in the Azores (August), in their hometown of Boston at the WAAF anniversary (September 19) as well as a few concerts in Japan (January 2005). After a hiatus during 2005, the band returned in 2006 with the "classic" Pornograffitti lineup (including Paul Geary) to do a small, three-show reunion tour through New England.

In July 2007, Bettencourt quit Satellite Party for another Extreme reunion with Cherone and Pat Badger. On November 26, 2007, the band announced plans for a world tour in the summer of 2008 with King's X as well as a release date for their new album, Saudades de Rock, produced by Bettencourt. Kevin Figueiredo, who played with Bettencourt in DramaGods and Satellite Party, took over drum duties for the band. Original drummer Paul Geary would still remain involved with the band, albeit in a management position. Singles from the album were made available on MySpace including "Star". The album was released on July 28, 2008, in France, August 4, 2008, in Europe, and August 12, 2008, in the United States.

The band then embarked on the Take Us Alive World Tour, supported by King's X in the US and Hot Leg in the UK, with various other dates in Europe and Asia, through all of 2008. In 2009, the band continued to tour, co-headlining the East Meets West Tour with Ratt. The final date of this tour, in their hometown of Boston, Massachusetts, was recorded for the release of the band's first live DVD called Take Us Alive.

=== 2010–2015: Hiatus, Hurtsmile, and other projects ===
According to a December 2010 interview with Cherone, Extreme had been writing new material for a new album, which they planned - at the time - to release in 2011. Asked in the same interview if the band will produce the new album by themselves or get an outside producer, Cherone replied, "There's talk of a few people. It would be great to get an A-list name. I don't know if that happens. My dream producer would probably be Rick Rubin. Here's a guy that's done Johnny Cash, the Chili Peppers, and, you know, Neil Diamond." But due to conflicting schedules with Bettencourt supporting Rihanna on her tour during 2011, plans to go into the studio were postponed to 2012.

Also in 2010 rumors started about possible commemorative shows for Extreme II: Pornograffitti, given the 20th anniversary of the record. Finally, in 2012, initially a small string of such shows in Japan had been confirmed, marking the full return of the band's activities after a hiatus when Bettencourt was on tour with Rihanna, as well as other side projects by other members, most notably Cherone's Hurtsmile. Extreme were to tour Australia in April 2013, with Richie Kotzen as support act, but the shows were cancelled due to scheduling conflicts with Rihanna's 2013 North American tour. They then did their first show in Singapore.

=== 2015–2025: Six ===
In a May 2015 interview with Eddie Trunk, vocalist Gary Cherone said that Extreme had been writing and demoing new material for their follow-up to Saudades de Rock, and would enter the studio in the fall to begin recording.

In a September 2016 interview, guitarist Nuno Bettencourt revealed that Extreme had been working on approximately 17 songs for their new album, and added, "We're about 17 songs into it. We're just wrapping them up. We've got to do vocals, some guitar. Slowly but surely." He also stated that the album was expected to be released in early 2017; however, this did not come to fruition and there had been no updates on the album until mid-2022, when Cherone reiterated the album's slow progress in an interview with Eddie Trunk, and described the songs as "some of the best stuff Nuno and [he] have written."

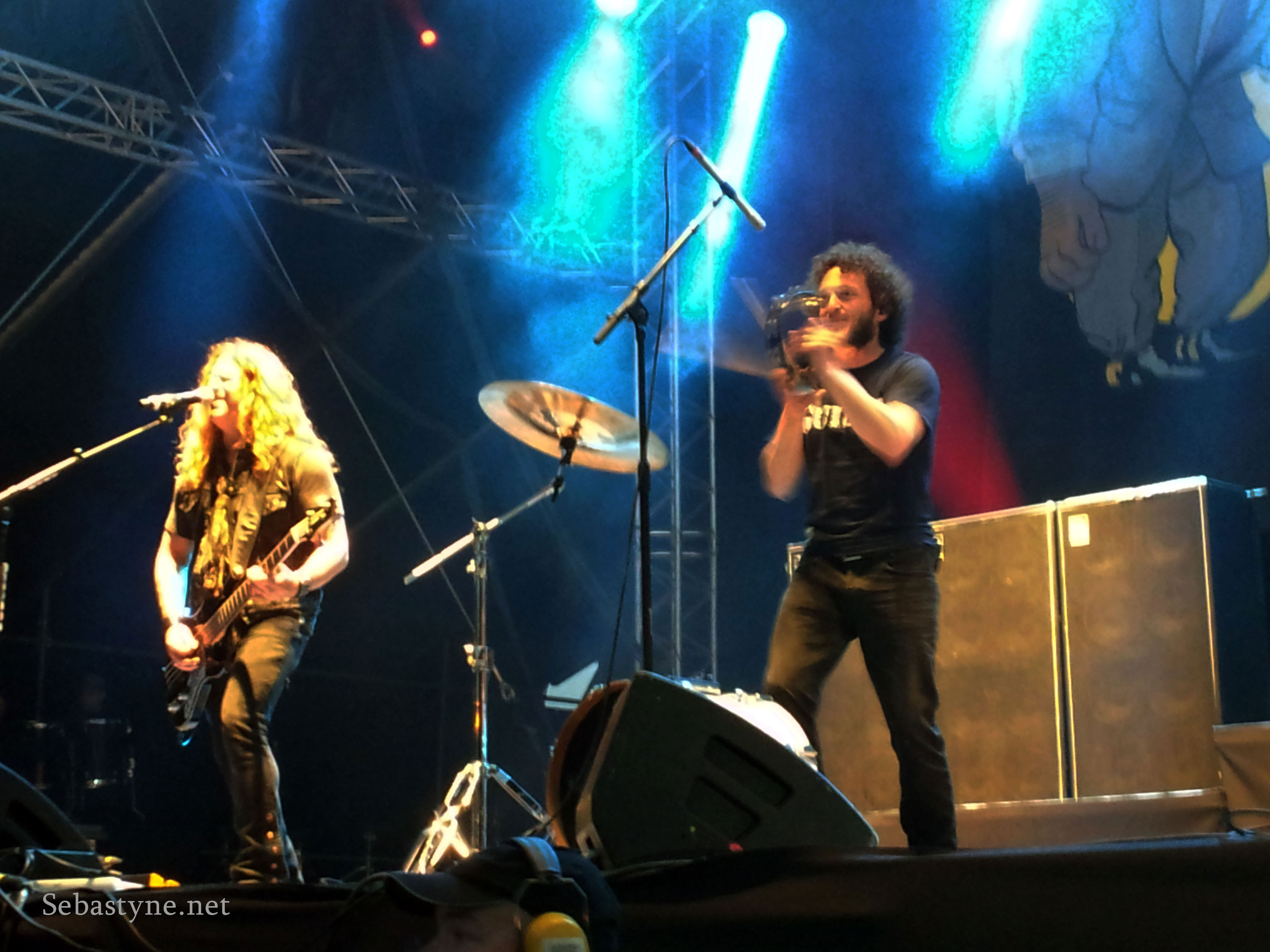
Extreme performing in 2015

In 2016, the band released Pornograffitti Live 25: Metal Meltdown, an audio/video presentation of its 2015 concert at Las Vegas' Hard Rock Casino.

During the 2017 Kiss Kruise, the band invited original drummer Paul Geary to join them on stage to play "Hole Hearted".

In June 2018, Extreme toured Australia with Mr. Big, which marked the latter's first tour of Australia and Extreme's first tour of the continent since 1993. After their Australian tour, they went on to tour Kuala Lumpur, Singapore, Bangkok and Taipei.

Extreme headlined Shirock 2019 alongside Scottish hard rock band Nazareth. On October 19, 2019, the band performed in India in front of over 30,000 fans in Ukhrul.

On February 17, 2023, the band began to release a different teaser each day, to end on February 28. On March 1, 2023, Extreme released the single "Rise" and announced that Six would be released on June 9 of the same year. On April 19, 2023, Extreme released the official videos for "Banshee" and "#Rebel" on their YouTube channel.

=== 2026–present: Upcoming seventh studio album ===
In March 2026, Bettencourt confirmed on The Mistress Carrie Podcast that the band had completed work on their upcoming seventh studio album.

== Band members ==
Current

- Gary Cherone – lead vocals (1985–1996, 2004, 2005, 2006, 2007–present)
- Nuno Bettencourt – guitars, keyboards, piano, backing and lead vocals, brass and orchestration arrangements (1985–1996, 2004, 2005, 2006, 2007–present)
- Pat Badger – bass, backing vocals (1985–1996, 2006, 2007–present)
- Kevin Figueiredo – drums, percussion (2007–present)

Former

- Paul Geary – drums, percussion, occasional backing vocals (1985–1994, 2004, 2005–2006; special guest 2017)
- Mike Mangini – drums, percussion (1994–1996, 2004; special guest for three shows in 2006)
- Carl Restivo – bass, backing vocals (2004)
- Steve Ferlazzo – keyboards (2004)
- Laurent Duval – bass, backing vocals (2005)

== Discography ==
- Extreme (1989)
- Extreme II: Pornograffitti (1990)
- III Sides to Every Story (1992)
- Waiting for the Punchline (1995)
- Saudades de Rock (2008)
- Six (2023)

== Concert tours ==
- Extreme Tour
- Pornograffitti Tour
- III Sides to Every Story Tour
- Waiting for the Punchline Tour
- 2004 Mini-Reunion Tour (Azores, Portugal)
- 2005 Reunion Tour (Japan)
- 2006 Reunion Mini-Tour (New England area, US)
- Take Us Alive World Tour 2008
- East Meets West Tour '09
- Pornograffitti Live Tour 2014
- Pornograffitti 25th Anniversary Tour 2015
- 2016 Tour
- 2017 Tour
- 2018 Australian Tour with Mr. Big
- 2019 Tour
- Thicker Than Blood 2023 with Living Colour

== See also ==
- List of artists who reached number one in the United States
- List of artists who reached number one on the U.S. Mainstream Rock chart
- List of former A&M Records artists
- List of funk metal bands
- List of glam metal bands and artists
- List of people from Boston
- List of performers on Top of the Pops
