= Paul Geary =

American drummer

- Born: July 24, 1961 (age 65); Medford, Massachusetts, U.S.
- Genre: Hard rock
- Occupations: Musician, artist manager
- Instrument: Drums
- Formerly of: Extreme

Paul Geary (born July 24, 1961) is an American drummer and artist manager. He was co-founder and drummer of the rock band Extreme, which he left in 1994 to pursue a career in artist management.

Geary founded Global Artist Management in Boston in 1995. One of his first signings was a then little-known Boston rock band Godsmack who would go on to sell more than 20 million albums under his watch. Geary ran Global Artist Management for 10 years before it was acquired by entertainment executive Irving Azoff in 2005.

Geary worked alongside Azoff and Jared Paul at "AGP" (for Azoff, Geary, Paul) Management (a division of Front Line Management Group) until January 2013, at which time Azoff resigned from the company, and Geary and his staff returned to operate under the moniker "Global Artist Management".

Geary's artist management credits include Smashing Pumpkins, Alter Bridge, Godsmack, Creed, Scorpions, Fuel, Steel Panther, Jason Bonham, Billy Ray Cyrus, Hoobastank, Joe Perry ("The Joe Perry Project"), and his former band Extreme.

Global Artist Management signed on to co-manage Hollywood Vampires with Shep Gordon in 2017. Principal members of the Vampires include Joe Perry, Johnny Depp, and Alice Cooper.

In June 2019, The Hollywood Reporter and other major publications announced that Global Artist Management signed on to manage Johnny Depp's musical career.

In May 2020, Paul Geary and Global Artist Management joined with Shelter Music Group, whose roster includes Fleetwood Mac, ZZ Top, Barenaked Ladies, and Puscifer.
