= Saudades de Rock =

Studio album by Extreme
- Released: August 12, 2008
- Recorded: November 2007 – April 2008
- Studios: NRG sttudios, North Hollywood, California, U.S.A.
- Genres: Hard rock; funk metal
- Length: 66:56
- Labels: Fontana, Frontiers (Europe only)
- Producer: Nuno Bettencourt

Extreme chronology
Waiting for the Punchline (1995)	Saudades de Rock (2008)	Take Us Alive (2010)

Singles from Saudades de Rock
- 1. "Star" / "Ghost" Released: 2008

Professional ratings
Review scores
Source	Rating
411Mania	8/10
AllMusic	(positive)
Billboard	(positive)
Blogcritics	(positive)
Boston Herald	(positive)
KNAC	5/5 stars
Metromix	3/5 stars
PopMatters	7/10

Saudades de Rock (which roughly translates from Portuguese as "Nostalgic Yearnings of Rock") is the fifth album by the American rock band Extreme. Released on August 12, 2008, it was the band's first album of new material since 1995's Waiting for the Punchline, and also their first release with new drummer Kevin Figueiredo.

== Production and marketing ==
On August 14, 2007, it was reported on Blabbermouth.net that Extreme were writing a new song, entitled "Rock 'n' Roll Man", to perform at the Brad Delp (late Boston singer) tribute concert, which was being held on August 19 in Boston, Massachusetts. In addition, vocalist Gary Cherone and guitarist Nuno Bettencourt had begun writing new material for Extreme's first post-reunion album. On November 26, 2007, while it was reported that Extreme were officially reformed, the band would eventually begin work on their new album for a spring 2008 release as well as a world tour to follow.

On January 15, 2008, Bettencourt posted an update stating that Extreme were "finishing up the recording" of their "new release". He claimed the band "had a great time jamming and creating" and also "ended up with about 24 tunes", which they "dwindled down to the 14 that will be on the record". He also described the songs as "a 'mishmash' of old-school rock and some tasty abstract ditties". On April 29, 2008, Cherone posted an update stating that the album was finished "except for one lead vocal and a few backgrounds" and said that Bettencourt was "working overtime finishing up the mixes". Cherone also stated that the album contained "the best performances of the band... ever".

On June 16, 2008, Blabbermouth.net announced August 1, 2008, as the release date for Saudades de Rock in Europe and on July 15, 2008, the band's website revealed a release date of August 12, 2008, for the US.

On July 22, 2008, the song "Comfortably Dumb" premiered on the band's profile at Ultimate Guitar.

The album's lead single, "Star", failed to chart in the US. However, the song and accompanying video for "King of the Ladies" reached number four on the AOL Video Charts in 2010, according to Billboard. Additional videos were shot for the songs "Interface", "Run", and "Ghost", which were released in 2010 on the Extreme DVD Take Us Alive.

== Track listing ==
Saudades de Rock track listing
No.	Title	Writer(s)	Length
1.	"Star"	Nuno Bettencourt, Gary Cherone	4:11
2.	"Comfortably Dumb"	Bettencourt, Cherone	4:44
3.	"Learn to Love"	Bettencourt, Cherone, Kevin Figueiredo	5:27
4.	"Take Us Alive"	Bettencourt, Cherone	3:23
5.	"Run"	Bettencourt, Cherone	4:41
6.	"Last Hour"	Bettencourt, Cherone	5:37
7.	"Flower Man"	Bettencourt, Cherone	3:54
8.	"King of the Ladies"	Bettencourt, Cherone, Anthony J. Resta, Carl Restivo	4:22
9.	"Ghost"	Bettencourt, Cherone	4:58
10.	"Slide"	Bettencourt, Figueiredo	4:35
11.	"Interface"	Bettencourt	4:34
12.	"Sunrise"	Bettencourt, Cherone, Figueiredo	6:14
13.	"Peace (Saudade)"	Bettencourt, Cherone	6:37
14.	"Americocaine" (demo 1985)	Bettencourt, Cherone, Paul Mangone	3:39

- Track 14 appears only on the European version released by Frontiers Records.
- Japanese edition includes bonus track "Mr. Bates" (demo 1986) instead of "Americocaine" (demo 1985).

== Credits ==
- Gary Cherone – lead vocals
- Nuno Bettencourt – guitars, keyboards, backing vocals
- Pat Badger – bass, backing vocals
- Kevin Figueiredo – drums

== Charts ==
Chart (2008)	Peak position
French Albums (SNEP)	148
Japanese Albums (Oricon)	13
UK Independent Albums (Official Charts)	12
UK Rock & Metal Albums (Official Charts)	13
US Billboard 200	78
US Top Hard Rock Albums (Billboard)	12
US Independent Albums (Billboard)	9
