= Pat Badger =

American musician

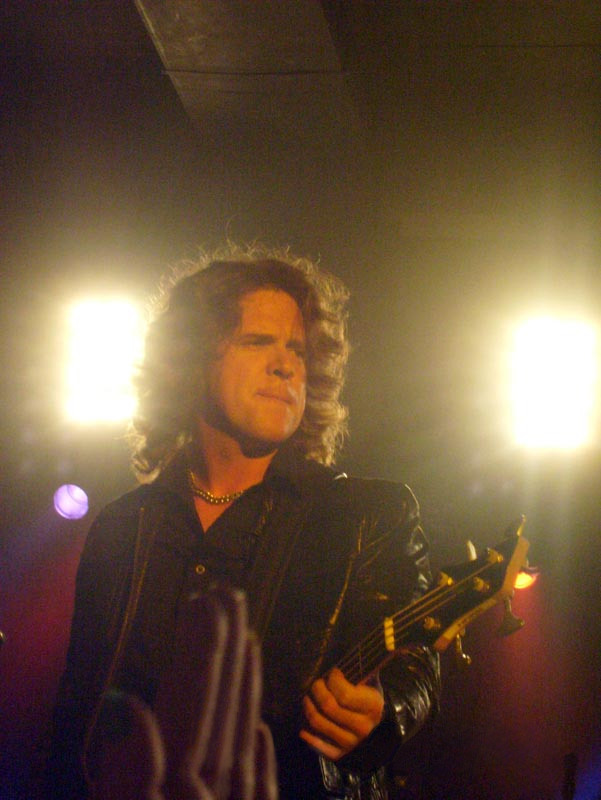

Background information
- Born: Patrick John Badger; July 22, 1967 (age 58); Groveland, Massachusetts, United States
- Genres: Hard rock, funk metal, blues rock, heavy metal, glam metal
- Occupations: Musician, songwriter
- Instruments: Bass guitar, vocals
- Years active: 1985–present
- Labels: A&M
- Member of: Extreme, Dark Desert Eagles
- Formerly of: Tribe of Judah
- Website: www.extreme-band.com www.darkdeserteagles.com

Patrick John Badger (born July 22, 1967) is a musician, singer, and songwriter, best known as the bass guitarist in the band Extreme.

He has also been a member of Tribe of Judah, and he is the founder of the tribute band Dark Desert Eagles.

== Early life ==
Badger was born in Boston, Massachusetts to Al Badger and Lily Badger (née Aguilar). He is of Irish and Honduran descent.

== Music ==
He sang backing vocals on both Dweezil Zappa's album Confessions and the Danger Danger album, Screw It!, along with his Extreme bandmates Gary Cherone and Nuno Bettencourt. He has also sung back-up on a live version of the Van Halen song, "When It's Love" on Sammy Hagar's live album, Live: Hallelujah, on which Cherone sang co-lead vocals with Hagar.

In 2013, Badger initiated a PledgeMusic campaign. This helped him release his first solo record, Time Will Tell. By offering exclusive content to listeners who pledged and providing updates related to the project to his following, the campaign reached its goal and the record entitled Time Will Tell was released in late 2014. In 2016 he followed up with another successful PledgeMusic campaign for his second solo album Take What We Want (under the name Nasty Ass Honey Badgers).

In 2017, affected by the death of Glenn Frey, Badger formed Dark Desert Eagles, a tribute to the Eagles. The original lineup of the band featured Extreme drummer Kevin Figueiredo.
