= Gary Cherone =

American singer (born 1961)

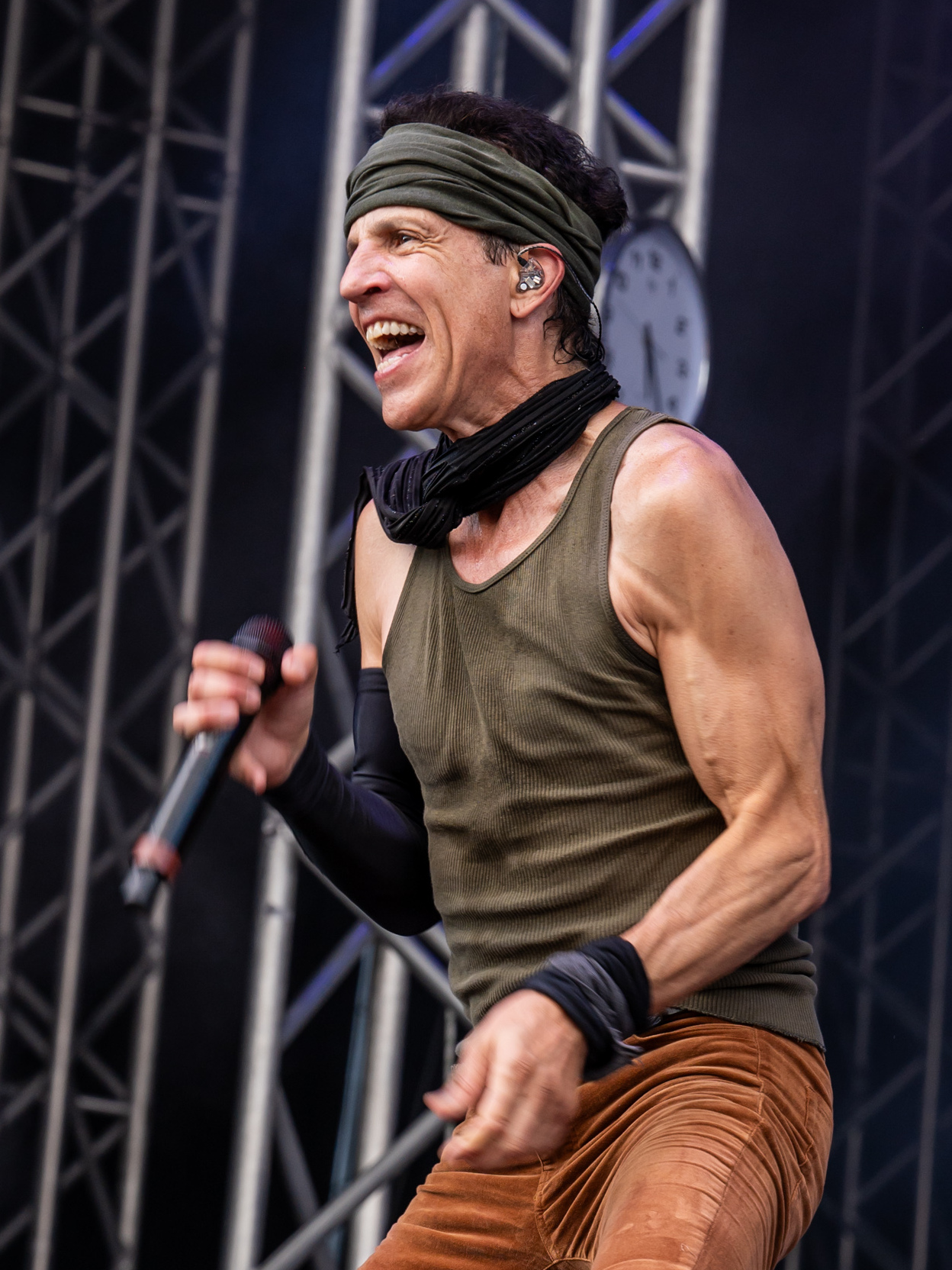
- Cherone in 2024

Background information
- Born: July 26, 1961 (age 64); Malden, Massachusetts, U.S.
- Genres: Funk metal; glam metal; hard rock; heavy metal
- Occupations: Singer; songwriter
- Years active: 1975–present
- Label: A&M
- Member of: Extreme; Hurtsmile; The Joe Perry Project; Slipkid
- Formerly of: Van Halen; Tribe of Judah

Gary Francis Cherone (/ʃəˈroʊn/ shə-ROHN; born July 26, 1961) is an American rock singer and songwriter. Cherone is known for his work as the lead vocalist of the Boston rock group Extreme and Van Halen.

== Early life ==
Cherone grew up in Malden, Massachusetts, and attended Malden High School. He is the third of five brothers and the younger fraternal twin.

In his teenage years, Cherone turned to singing in local bands and was heavily influenced by the reigning rock frontmen of the day, most notably Roger Daltrey of The Who, Steven Tyler of Aerosmith, and Queen's Freddie Mercury. In 1979 Cherone and drummer friend Paul Geary along with guitarist Matt McKay, formed a hard-rock band called Adrenalin, which performed locally. In 1981, they changed the band's name to The Dream and recorded a six-song independent vinyl EP.

A few years later, Cherone and The Dream appeared in a music video produced by David Horgan, on the early MTV program, Basement Tapes, a show in which the viewing audience "voted" (via a toll-free telephone number) for one of two competing amateur music videos submitted by unsigned artists. The Dream's video for "Mutha, Don't Wanna Go to School Today", won their contest, beating a then-unknown Henry Lee Summer by just 1% of the total vote.

== Career ==
=== With Extreme ===
In 1985, Cherone and Geary met guitarist Nuno Bettencourt and bassist Pat Badger in an altercation over a dressing room, but the rivals soon became collaborators and shortly after the combined foursome took the name Extreme, and began writing their own material. The name Extreme came from a play on the words "Ex-Dream". By the late 1980s, the group had attracted a large regional following; in 1987, the band signed with A&M Records, which released their self-titled debut album in 1989. Selling over 250,000 copies, the band's debut album justified a second, and in 1990 the band recorded the critically acclaimed Extreme II: Pornograffiti, a mix of hard rock, funk, and pop propelled by Bettencourt's guitar playing. The album's lyrical content, mostly written by Cherone, was loosely based on the concept of a fictional young boy named "Francis" and his observations of a decadent, corrupt, and misogynistic society.

Although well received by the rock world in the press, initial sales and chart success for the album were sluggish until A&M released the acoustic ballad "More Than Words" in the early spring of 1991. The song was picked up by mainstream radio and became a huge smash, reaching No. 1 on the Billboard Hot 100 that summer. Extreme II: Pornograffiti was eventually certified double platinum. Also in 1991, Extreme toured in support of David Lee Roth.

Cherone's career came full circle in April 1992 when he performed "Hammer to Fall" onstage with the three surviving members of Queen at The Freddie Mercury Tribute Concert at Wembley Stadium. Extreme also performed a medley of Queen hits during the first half of the concert. Later that year, Extreme released III Sides To Every Story, a concept album.

Extreme's 1995 recording, Waiting for the Punchline, was a stripped-down affair that was only modestly successful. After the supporting tour, Bettencourt became dissatisfied and left the group to launch a solo career. Extreme officially folded soon afterward.

=== With Van Halen ===
In 1996, rock band Van Halen had a falling out with their second lead singer, Sammy Hagar, who had been with the band since 1985. After a failed reunion attempt with original lead vocalist David Lee Roth, who had been with Van Halen from 1974 to 1985, Van Halen was once again without a lead vocalist. At the urging of Van Halen's manager, Ray Danniels (who also managed Extreme), Cherone was called for an audition. Guitarist Eddie Van Halen took to Cherone personally and musically, and in November 1996, he became Van Halen's third lead vocalist, while also taking up residence in Eddie's guest house while writing and recording a new studio album.

Released on March 17, 1998, Van Halen III debuted at No. 4 on the Billboard 200 album chart, selling 197,000 copies in its first week then 500,000 by summer (RIAA gold certified in the United States) and over 700,000 copies as of 2011. The album featured a marked departure from the straightforward arena rock that Van Halen had played with Hagar and contrasting with the tongue-in-cheek bombast of the Roth era. Van Halen III's songs had a more progressive sound and were often longer and more lyrically intricate than earlier Van Halen material. The album only produced a sole No. 1 Billboard Mainstream Rock hit in "Without You".

Given the success of previous Van Halen albums it was considered a flop. Neither the album nor the supporting tour performed to financial expectations, and Van Halen III was the first album by the band to not achieve at least double platinum status, though the tour was well received by fans. The tour included many songs that Van Halen had not played since Roth's departure in 1984. Van Halen toured outside of North America in 1998, playing dates in Japan, Europe and for the first time, Australia and New Zealand. One date in Australia was filmed and aired on MTV.

Plans progressed for a follow-up album, rumoured to be called Love Again, to be released at the end of 1999. Reportedly, Van Halen's then-record company Warner Bros. sent back the new album twice because they did not hear a "hit" pop single on it. Frustrated by the rejections from the record label, Cherone left Van Halen amicably. Since then, Cherone has gone on record numerous times with his thoughts about why the collaboration failed to work.

Years later, when reflecting on his time in the band, Cherone stated "I was one of the three singers in the mighty Van Halen. You can't take that away from me."

=== Post-Van Halen ===
After his departure from Van Halen, Cherone returned to Boston and put together a new project, Tribe of Judah. The band played several shows in the Boston area and released a CD on Spitfire Records entitled Exit Elvis.

He has on occasion guested with Sammy Hagar and Michael Anthony during their The Other Half performances, and Nuno Bettencourt's recent projects, as well as with the Boston Rock Opera.

In February 2003, just one week after The Station nightclub fire, Gary and his brother Markus performed "More Than Words" during a memorial service for the victims. The memorial was broadcast live on WHJY in Providence, RI.

In 2005, Cherone released a four-song sampler CD, Need I Say More, that was written and produced by Steve Catizone and Leo Mellace. This album was recorded by Jeff Yurek at Sanctum Sound in Boston, Massachusetts, and mixed by Carl Nappa in New York City. Musicians including Dave DiCenso (drums), Baron Browne (bass) and Steve Hunt (keyboards) are also featured on the record.

In May 2006, Cherone sang in three shows as part of Amazing Journey, a tribute to The Who created by ex-Dream Theater drummer Mike Portnoy, featuring Paul Gilbert on guitar and Billy Sheehan on bass. Not long after, Gary and his brother Markus Cherone created their own tribute to The Who, Slip Kid. Presently the band continues to perform regularly in the Greater Boston area.

Later that year, Van Halen was inducted into the Rock and Roll Hall of Fame. Cherone's three-year stint with the group did not establish him as a band member eligible for induction. However, at the televised induction ceremony, the group's former bassist Michael Anthony thanked Cherone for his contributions.

=== Back to Extreme ===
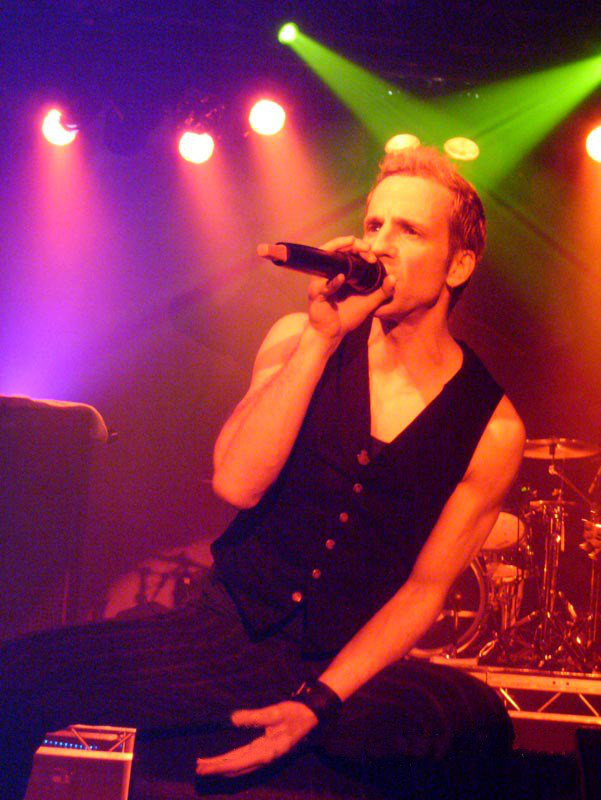
Cherone with Extreme in 2008

Since 2004 Extreme have re-united with Cherone on several occasions for "one off" shows in their home town and in New England, but in November 2007, they announced plans to do another world tour along with a new album.

The album Saudades de Rock was released in August 2008.

In 2016, the band released Pornograffitti Live 25: Metal Meltdown, an audio/video presentation of its 2015 concert at Las Vegas' Hard Rock Casino.

In 2023, the band released their sixth studio album, called Six.

=== SlipKid ===
Cherone has toured with SlipKid, a tribute to The Who. Cherone's former Extreme bandmate, Paul Mangone, is the bassist, and his brother, Markus Cherone, is the guitarist.

=== Hurtsmile ===
Cherone has formed a new band with his brother Markus on guitar, Joe Pessia on bass/mandolin and Dana Spellman on drums. They have released a self-titled debut album in early 2011 and have toured to promote it.

Their follow-up album, "Retro Grenade", was released in 2014.

=== The Joe Perry Project ===
In 2022, Cherone was enlisted by Aerosmith guitarist Joe Perry to sing in The Joe Perry Project, which led to shows performed that year and in 2023. Thus far, Cherone has not recorded with the band.

== Personal life ==
Cherone is pro-life and openly Christian. Cherone was raised Catholic. He covered the Kanye West song "God Is" for Easter Sunday in 2020. On March 5, 2014, he tweeted, "Atheism would seem a more plausible faith if it wasn't for its first of many miraculous claims: something from nothing #Faitheism". In June 1999 and again in January 2001, Cherone wrote a pair of open letters to Eddie Vedder in response to the latter's support for the pro-choice movement. Cherone discussed his June 1999 letter on The O'Reilly Factor.

== Discography ==
=== Solo ===
- Need I Say More (2005) (EP)
- "Perfect World" (2003) (Single)

=== With Extreme ===
- Extreme (1989)
- Extreme II: Pornograffitti (1990)
- III Sides to Every Story (1992)
- Waiting for the Punchline (1995)
- Saudades de Rock (2008)
- Six (2023)

=== With Van Halen ===
- Van Halen III (1998)

=== With Tribe of Judah ===
- Exit Elvis (2002)

=== With Hurtsmile ===
- Hurtsmile (2011)
- Retrogrenade (2014)
