= List of number-one songs of the 2010s (Czech Republic) =

Rádio Top 100 Oficiální is the official chart of the top ranking songs as based on airplay in the Czech Republic, compiled and published weekly by IFPI Czech Republic.

Below is the list of songs that have reached number one on the Rádio Top 100 Oficiální during the 2010s.

== Number-one songs ==
| Issue date | Song | Artist | Weeks at number one |
2010
| December 15, 2009 | "Sexy Bitch" | David Guetta featuring Akon | 4 |
| January 20 | "Hotel Room Service" | Pitbull | 2 |
| February 3 | "Bad Romance" | Lady Gaga | 2 |
| February 17 | "Empire State of Mind" | Jay-Z and Alicia Keys | 1 |
| February 24 | "Russian Roulette" | Rihanna | 1 |
| March 3 | "Príbeh" | Tina & Rytmus | 2 |
| March 17 | "Empire State of Mind" | Jay-Z featuring Alicia Keys | 2 |
| March 31 | "Bad Romance" | Lady Gaga | 1 |
| April 7 | "Stereo Love" | Edward Maya and Vika Jigulina | 9 |
| June 8 | "Alors on Danse" | Stromae | 1 |
| June 15 | "If We Ever Meet Again" | Timbaland featuring Katy Perry | 1 |
| June 22 | "Alors on Danse" | Stromae | 2 |
| July 6 | "Stereo Love" | Edward Maya and Vika Jigulina | 1 |
| July 13 | "Alors on Danse" | Stromae | 1 |
| July 20 | "The Radio" | Get Far | 1 |
| July 27 | "Alors on Danse" | Stromae | 1 |
| August 3 | "We No Speak Americano" | Yolanda Be Cool and DCUP | 1 |
| August 10 | "The Radio" | Get Far | 1 |
| August 17 | "Láska v housce" | Xindl X featuring Olga Lounova | 1 |
| August 24 | "Alejandro" | Lady Gaga | 1 |
| August 31 | "We No Speak Americano" | Yolanda Be Cool and DCUP | 3 |
| September 21 | "Waka Waka (This Time for Africa)" | Shakira featuring Freshlyground | 1 |
| September 28 | "We No Speak Americano" | Yolanda Be Cool and DCUP | 5 |
| November 2 | "Helele" | Velile featuring Safri Duo | 1 |
| November 9 | "Waka Waka (This Time for Africa)" | Shakira featuring Freshlyground | 2 |
| November 23 | "Airplanes" | B.o.B featuring Hayley Williams | 1 |
| November 30 | "Helele" | Velile featuring Safri Duo | 1 |
| December 7 | "Raise Your Glass" | Pink | 1 |
| December 14 | "Airplanes" | B.o.B featuring Hayley Williams | 2 |
| December 28 | "Helele" | Velile featuring Safri Duo | 1 |
2011
| January 4 | "Barbra Streisand" | Duck Sauce | 2 |
| January 19 | "The Time (Dirty Bit)" | The Black Eyed Peas | 1 |
| January 26 | "Loca" | Shakira featuring Dizzee Rascal | 7 |
| March 16 | "Barbra Streisand" | Duck Sauce | 1 |
| March 23 | "Hello" | Martin Solveig and Dragonette | 4 |
| April 20 | "Hey (Nah Neh Nah)" | Milk & Sugar vs. Vaya Con Dios | 5 |
| May 24 | "On the Floor" | Jennifer Lopez & Pitbull | 1 |
| May 31 | "Hey (Nah Neh Nah)" | Milk & Sugar vs. Vaya Con Dios | 6 |
| July 12 | "Just Can't Get Enough" | The Black Eyed Peas | 2 |
| July 26 | "The Lazy Song" | Bruno Mars | 1 |
| August 2 | "Party Rock Anthem" | LMFAO featuring Lauren Bennett and GoonRock | 1 |
| August 9 | "The Lazy Song" | Bruno Mars | 2 |
| August 23 | "Someone Like You" | Adele | 2 |
| September 6 | "Last Friday Night (T.G.I.F.)" | Katy Perry | 1 |
| September 13 | "Danza Kuduro" | Don Omar featuring Lucenzo | 8 |
| November 8 | "Hey Boy" | Verona | 2 |
| November 22 | "Danza Kuduro" | Don Omar featuring Lucenzo | 1 |
| November 29 | "Půlnoční" | Václav Neckář & Umakart | 1 |
| December 6 | "Set Fire to the Rain" | Adele | 1 |
| December 13 | "Marry You" | Bruno Mars | 1 |
| December 20 | "Šrouby a matice" | Mandrage | 8 |
2012
| February 14 | "Paradise" | Coldplay | 1 |
| February 21 | "Šrouby a matice" | Mandrage | 3 |
| March 13 | "Ai Se Eu Te Pego!" | Michel Teló | 3 |
| April 3 | "Šrouby a matice" | Mandrage | 1 |
| April 10 | "Somebody That I Used to Know" | Gotye featuring Kimbra | 2 |
| April 24 | "Čekám na signál" | Nightwork | 1 |
| May 1 | "Somebody That I Used to Know" | Gotye featuring Kimbra | 1 |
| May 8 | "Ma Chérie" | DJ Antoine | 2 |
| May 22 | "Call Me Maybe" | Carly Rae Jepsen | 8 |
| July 17 | "Whistle" | Flo Rida | 2 |
| July 31 | "Hey Now" | Peter Bič Project | 5 |
| September 4 | "Endless Summer" | Oceana | 1 |
| September 11 | "Hey Now" | Peter Bič Project | 3 |
| October 2 | "Inzerát" | Kryštof | 2 |
| October 16 | "Gangnam Style" | PSY | 1 |
| October 23 | "Inzerát" | Kryštof | 3 |
| November 13 | "Skyfall" | Adele | 3 |
| December 4 | "Diamonds" | Rihanna | 9 |
2013
| February 5 | "Everything at Once" | Lenka | 5 |
| March 12 | "I Knew You Were Trouble" | Taylor Swift | 2 |
| March 26 | "Stay" | Rihanna featuring Mikky Ekko | 1 |
| April 2 | "I Knew You Were Trouble" | Taylor Swift | 3 |
| April 23 | "Feel This Moment" | Pitbull featuring Christina Aguilera | 1 |
| April 30 | "Just Give Me a Reason" | Pink featuring Nate Ruess | 5 |
| June 4 | "Impossible" | James Arthur | 1 |
| June 10 | "Just Give Me a Reason" | Pink featuring Nate Ruess | 1 |
| June 17 | "Let Her Go" | Passenger | 1 |
| June 24 | "Impossible" | James Arthur | 1 |
| July 1 | "I Need Your Love" | Calvin Harris featuring Ellie Goulding | 2 |
| July 15 | "C'est la vie" | Khaled | 2 |
| July 29 | "Under" | Alex Hepburn | 1 |
| August 5 | "Wake Me Up" | Avicii featuring Aloe Blacc | 4 |
| September 2 | "La La La" | Naughty Boy featuring Sam Smith | 1 |
| September 9 | "Wake Me Up" | Avicii featuring Aloe Blacc | 3 |
| September 30 | "Cesta" | Kryštof featuring Tomáš Klus | 15 |
2014
| January 13 | "Hey Brother" | Avicii | 6 |
| February 24 | "Happy" | Pharrell Williams | 4 |
| March 24 | "Stolen Dance" | Milky Chance | 5 |
| May 5 | "Changes" | Faul & Wad Ad vs. Pnau | 1 |
| May 12 | "Rather Be" | Clean Bandit featuring Jess Glynne | 1 |
| May 19 | "Jubel" | Klingande | 2 |
| June 3 | "Changes" | Faul & Wad Ad vs. Pnau | 1 |
| June 10 | "Addicted to You" | Avicii | 1 |
| June 17 | "Waves" | Mr Probz | 2 |
| July 1 | "Hlavolam" | Chinaski | 1 |
| July 8 | "V blbým věku" | Xindl X | 4 |
| August 5 | "Budapest" | George Ezra | 1 |
| August 12 | "V blbým věku" | Xindl X | 11 |
| October 28 | "Lovers on the Sun" | David Guetta and Sam Martin | 2 |
| November 11 | "Víno" | Chinaski | 4 |
| December 9 | "Boom Clap" | Charli XCX | 1 |
| December 16 | "When the Beat Drops Out" | Marlon Roudette | 1 |
| December 23 | "Víno" | Chinaski | 4 |
2015
| January 20 | "Geronimo" | Sheppard | 1 |
| January 27 | "Take Me to Church" | Hozier | 6 |
| March 10 | "Love Me like You Do" | Ellie Goulding | 7 |
| April 27 | "Srdcebeat" | Kryštof | 6 |
| June 8 | "Cheerleader" (Felix Jaehn Remix) | OMI | 2 |
| June 22 | "Are You with Me" | Lost Frequencies | 1 |
| June 29 | "Firestone" | Kygo | 1 |
| July 6 | "Are You with Me" | Lost Frequencies | 1 |
| July 13 | "Firestone" | Kygo | 1 |
| July 20 | "Don't Worry" | Madcon featuring Ray Dalton | 1 |
| July 27 | "Firestone" | Kygo | 1 |
| August 3 | "Bills" | LunchMoney Lewis | 1 |
| August 10 | "Ain't Nobody" (Felix Jaehn Remix) | Felix Jaehn featuring Jasmine Thompson | 1 |
| August 17 | "Ty a já" | Kryštof | 9 |
| October 19 | "Cudzinka v tvojej zemi" | Xindl X & Mirka Miškechová | 7 |
| December 7 | "Hello" | Adele | 11 |
2016
| February 22 | "Ex's & Oh's" | Elle King | 1 |
| February 29 | "Endless Day" | Verona | 2 |
| March 14 | "Love Yourself" | Justin Bieber | 3 |
| April 4 | "Catch & Release" | Matt Simons | 3 |
| April 25 | "Faded" | Alan Walker | 6 |
| June 6 | "Cheap Thrills" | Sia | 3 |
| June 27 | "I Took a Pill in Ibiza" (SeeB remix) | Mike Posner | 4 |
| July 25 | "Cheap Thrills" | Sia | 1 |
| August 1 | "Can't Stop the Feeling!" | Justin Timberlake | 1 |
| August 8 | "Slovenský klín" | Chinaski | 3 |
| August 29 | "Duele el Corazón" | Enrique Iglesias featuring Wisin | 1 |
| September 5 | "Ain't Your Mama" | Jennifer Lopez | 2 |
| September 19 | "Slovenský klín" | Chinaski | 2 |
| October 3 | "Hell.o" | Lenny | 3 |
| October 24 | "Please Tell Rosie" | Alle Farben & Younotus | 2 |
| November 7 | "Sofia" | Álvaro Soler | 1 |
| November 14 | "Sing Me to Sleep" | Alan Walker | 1 |
| November 21 | "Heathens" | Twenty One Pilots | 3 |
| December 12 | "Popelka" | Xindl X | 1 |
| December 19 | "Lost on You" | LP | 5 |
2017
| January 23 | "My Way" | Calvin Harris | 1 |
| January 30 | "Lost on You" | LP | 2 |
| February 13 | "Human" | Rag'n'Bone Man | 2 |
| February 27 | "Shape of You" | Ed Sheeran | 3 |
| March 20 | "Human" | Rag'n'Bone Man | 1 |
| March 27 | "Shape of You" | Ed Sheeran | 3 |
| April 17 | "Není nám do pláče" | Chinaski | 1 |
| April 24 | "Be Mine" | Ofenbach | 2 |
| May 8 | "Alone" | Alan Walker | 1 |
| May 15 | "Súbeme La Radio" | Enrique Iglesias | 1 |
| May 22 | "Když Nemůžeš, Tak Přidej" | Mirai | 1 |
| May 29 | "Súbeme La Radio" | Enrique Iglesias | 3 |
| June 19 | "Skin" | Rag'n'Bone Man | 1 |
| June 26 | "Something Just Like This" | The Chainsmokers and Coldplay | 1 |
| July 3 | "Skin" | Rag'n'Bone Man | 1 |
| July 10 | "Something Just Like This" | The Chainsmokers and Coldplay | 3 |
| July 31 | "Venku je na nule" | Chinaski | 4 |
| August 28 | "Když Nemůžeš, Tak Přidej" | Mirai | 1 |
| September 4 | "Venku je na nule" | Chinaski | 2 |
| September 18 | "There's Nothing Holdin' Me Back" | Shawn Mendes | 1 |
| September 25 | "Venku je na nule" | Chinaski | 3 |
| October 16 | "More Than You Know" | Axwell featuring Sebastian Ingrosso | 2 |
| October 30 | "What About Us" | Pink | 2 |
| November 13 | "Když Nemůžeš, Tak Přidej" | Mirai | 1 |
| November 20 | "More Than You Know" | Axwell featuring Sebastian Ingrosso | 3 |
| December 11 | "Words" | Emma Drobná | 3 |
2018
| January 1 | "Zůstaň tu se mnou (Za sny)" | Kryštof | 3 |
| January 22 | "Perfect" | Ed Sheeran | 1 |
| January 29 | "Zůstaň tu se mnou (Za sny)" | Kryštof | 1 |
| February 5 | "Katchi" | Ofenbach and Nick Waterhouse | 1 |
| February 12 | "Perfect" | Ed Sheeran | 1 |
| February 19 | "Katchi" | Ofenbach and Nick Waterhouse | 2 |
| March 5 | "Potkal jsem tě po letech" | Chinaski | 2 |
| March 19 | "Motýli" | Mandrage | 1 |
| March 26 | "Without You" | Avicii | 1 |
| April 2 | "Potkal jsem tě po letech" | Chinaski | 1 |
| April 9 | "Rooftop" | Nico Santos | 1 |
| April 16 | "Potkal jsem tě po letech" | Chinaski | 1 |
| April 23 | "Échame la culpa" | Luis Fonsi & Demi Lovato | 1 |
| April 30 | "For You" | Liam Payne & Rita Ora | 1 |
| May 7 | "These Days" | Rudimental featuring Macklemore, Jess Glynne and Dan Caplen | 4 |
| June 4 | "Zůstaň tu se mnou (Za sny)" | Kryštof | 1 |
| June 11 | "Crazy" | Lost Frequencies featuring Zonderling | 2 |
| June 25 | "Takhle tě mám rád" | Lucie | 1 |
| July 2 | "Sanctuary" | Welshly Arms | 1 |
| July 9 | "Follow Your Fire" | Kodaline | 3 |
| July 30 | "Sanctuary" | Welshly Arms | 1 |
| August 6 | "Remind Me to Forget" | Kygo featuring Miguel | 1 |
| August 13 | "Flames" | David Guetta and Sia | 2 |
| August 27 | "Rise" | Jonas Blue featuring Jack & Jack | 1 |
| September 3 | "La Cintura" | Álvaro Soler | 1 |
| September 10 | "Rise" | Jonas Blue featuring Jack & Jack | 1 |
| September 17 | "La Cintura" | Álvaro Soler | 2 |
| October 1 | "Rise" | Jonas Blue featuring Jack & Jack | 1 |
| October 8 | "Chci tančit" | Mirai | 2 |
| October 22 | "Connection" | OneRepublic | 1 |
| October 29 | "Shotgun" | George Ezra | 2 |
| November 12 | "Be Alright" | Dean Lewis | 1 |
| November 19 | "Shotgun" | George Ezra | 5 |
| December 24 | "Girls Go Wild" | LP | 2 |
2019
| January 7 | "Sweet but Psycho" | Ava Max | 1 |
| January 14 | "Girls Go Wild" | LP | 2 |
| January 28 | "Sweet but Psycho" | Ava Max | 1 |
| February 4 | "Bad Liar" | Imagine Dragons | 1 |
| February 11 | "Sweet but Psycho" | Ava Max | 1 |
| February 18 | "Fading" | Alle Farben and Ilira | 2 |
| March 4 | "Sweet but Psycho" | Ava Max | 2 |
| March 18 | "Fading" | Alle Farben and Ilira | 1 |
| March 25 | "Let Me Down Slowly" | Alec Benjamin | 2 |
| April 8 | "Nothing Breaks Like a Heart" | Mark Ronson featuring Miley Cyrus | 2 |
| April 22 | "Let Me Down Slowly" | Alec Benjamin | 3 |
| May 13 | "Power Over Me" | Dermot Kennedy | 1 |
| May 20 | "Speechless" | Robin Schulz featuring Erika Sirola | 1 |
| May 27 | "Someone You Loved" | Lewis Capaldi | 6 |
| July 8 | "Con Calma" | Daddy Yankee featuring Snow | 3 |
| July 29 | "SOS" | Avicii featuring Aloe Blacc | 2 |
| August 12 | "No Sleep" | Martin Garrix featuring Bonn | 1 |
| August 19 | "I Don't Care" | Ed Sheeran and Justin Bieber | 2 |
| September 2 | "La Libertad" | Álvaro Soler | 1 |
| September 9 | "Acapella" | Mikolas Josef featuring Fito Blanko and Frankie J | 1 |
| September 16 | "Sucker" | Jonas Brothers | 1 |
| September 23 | "Señorita" | Shawn Mendes and Camila Cabello | 1 |
| September 30 | "Acapella" | Mikolas Josef featuring Fito Blanko and Frankie J | 1 |
| October 7 | "Sing It with Me" | JP Cooper featuring Astrid S | 3 |
| October 28 | "Lovers Do" | Lenny | 1 |
| November 4 | "Láska a data" | Chinaski | 2 |
| November 18 | "Señorita" | Shawn Mendes and Camila Cabello | 1 |
| November 25 | "Dance Monkey" | Tones and I | 2 |
| December 9 | "Láska a data" | Chinaski | 2 |
| December 23 | "Dance Monkey" | Tones and I | 3 |

== See also ==
- 2010s in music
