= List of number-one albums (Czech Republic) =

This is a list of the albums ranked number one in the Czech Republic. The top-performing albums and EPs in the Czech Republic are ranked on the Albums – Top 100, which is published by the IFPI Czech Republic. The data is based on sales (both at retail and digital), and online streaming on Spotify, Apple Music, Google Play and Deezer.

== Lists ==
- List of number-one albums of the 2010s (Czech Republic)
- List of number-one albums of the 2020s (Czech Republic)

== See also ==
- List of number-one songs of the 2000s (Czech Republic)
- List of number-one songs of the 2010s (Czech Republic)
- List of number-one songs of the 2020s (Czech Republic)
