= Cizí zeď =

Single by ONEMANSHOW Foundation
- Released: September 13, 2018
- Length: 2:58 min (music video 4:50 min)
- Label: EWOlution / Warner Music Poland
- Producer: Ondřej Fiedler

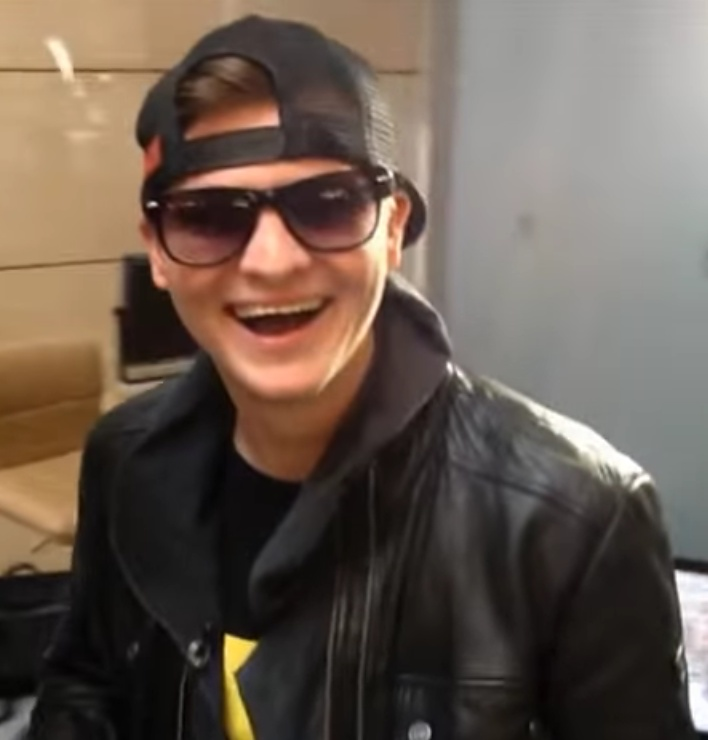
Kazma Kazmitch, moderator of internet show One Man Show

Cizí zeď is song in Czech and Slovak released to the 1/10 campaign by ONEMANSHOW Foundation. The song was premiered on Stream.cz on September 12, 2018 in the video Odhalení skandálu prohrané sázky o Ferrari za 8 000 000 Kč. This video received 1,000,000 views in less than 1 day. On Youtube, a video clip with the song was uploaded a day later - September 13, 2018. The video was placed in Czech Trends in a few hours. After less than a day he reached #1 in Czech YouTube Trends, holding this position for quite some time. 1 week after release, the video had 1.9 million views on YouTube.

== Credits ==
=== Singers ===
- Ewa Farna
- Lucie Bílá
- Jiří Macháček
- Ondřej Hejma
- Ondřej Brzobohatý
- Terezie Kovalová
- Kuba Ryba
- Jakub Děkan
- Sebastian
- Vojtěch Dyk
- Vojta D
- Iva Pazderková
- Emma Smetana
- Bára Basiková
- Tomáš Klus
- Richard Krajčo (from band Kryštof)
- Mirai Navrátil (from band Mirai)
- Mariana Prachařová
- Pepa Vojtek (from band Kabát)
- Adam Mišík
- Ondřej Ládek aka Xindl X
- Michal Malátný (from band Chinaski)
- Deborah Kahl aka Debbie
- Jan Pokorný aka Pokáč
- Václav Lebeda aka Voxel
- Tomáš Maček aka Thom Artway
- Jan Bendig
- Milan Peroutka

=== Rap ===
- Adam Svatoš aka Kato
- Michal Dušička aka Majk Spirit
- Michal Straka aka Ego

=== Lyrics ===
- Pokáč
- Ondřej Fiedler

=== Others ===
- Ondřej Brzobohatý – piano
- Robert Picka – studio engineer
- Jan Steinsdorfer – symphonic arrangements
- Terezie Kovalová – violoncello
- Jan Bradáč – violin
- Lukáš Chromek – guitars
- Marcel Procházka – supervision of harmony
- Boris Carloff – studio soundevice
- Hana Vinglerova – choir
- Jan Steninsdorfer, Karla Sluková – orchestra
- Hanz Sedlář – conductor

== Gallery ==
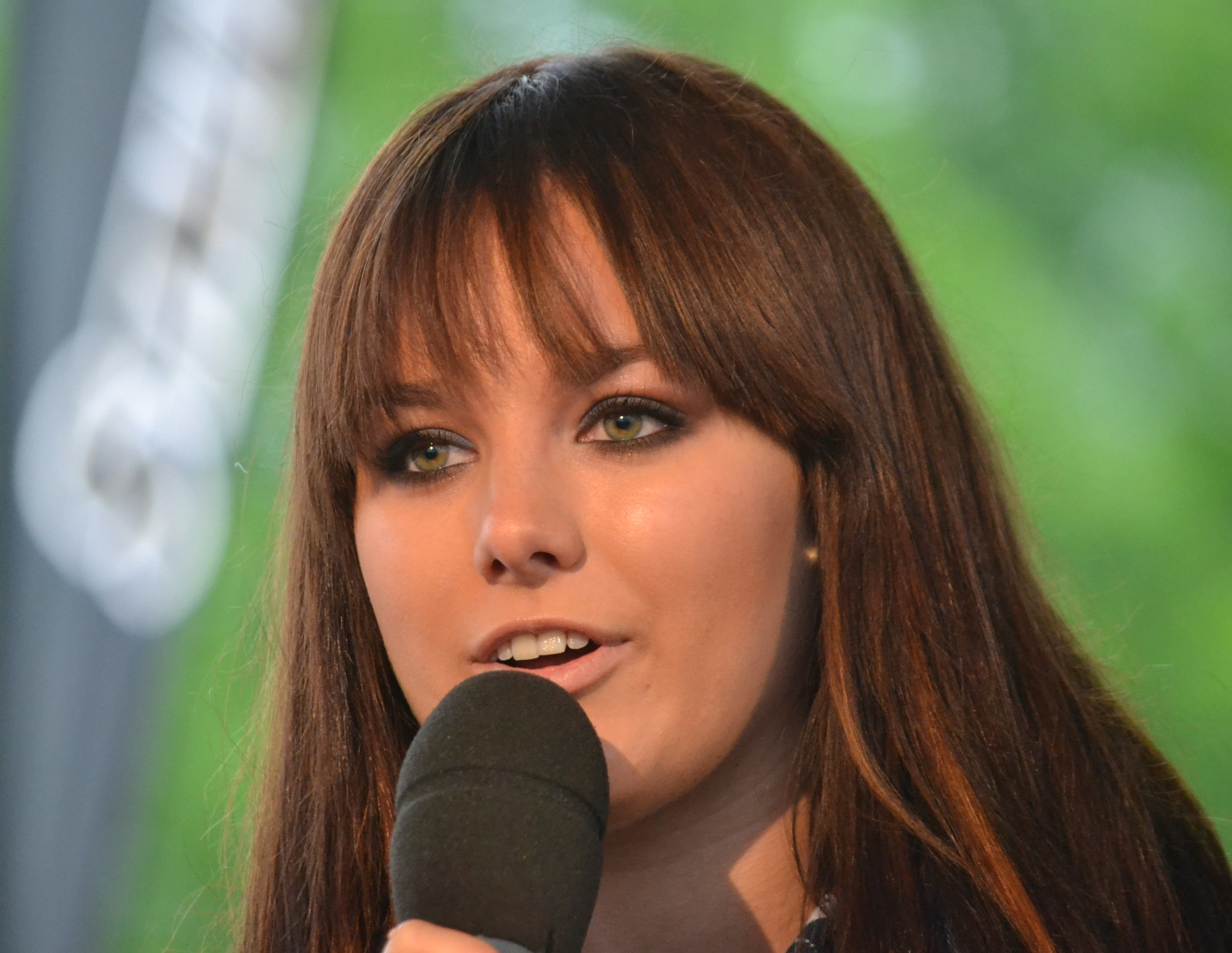
Ewa Farna

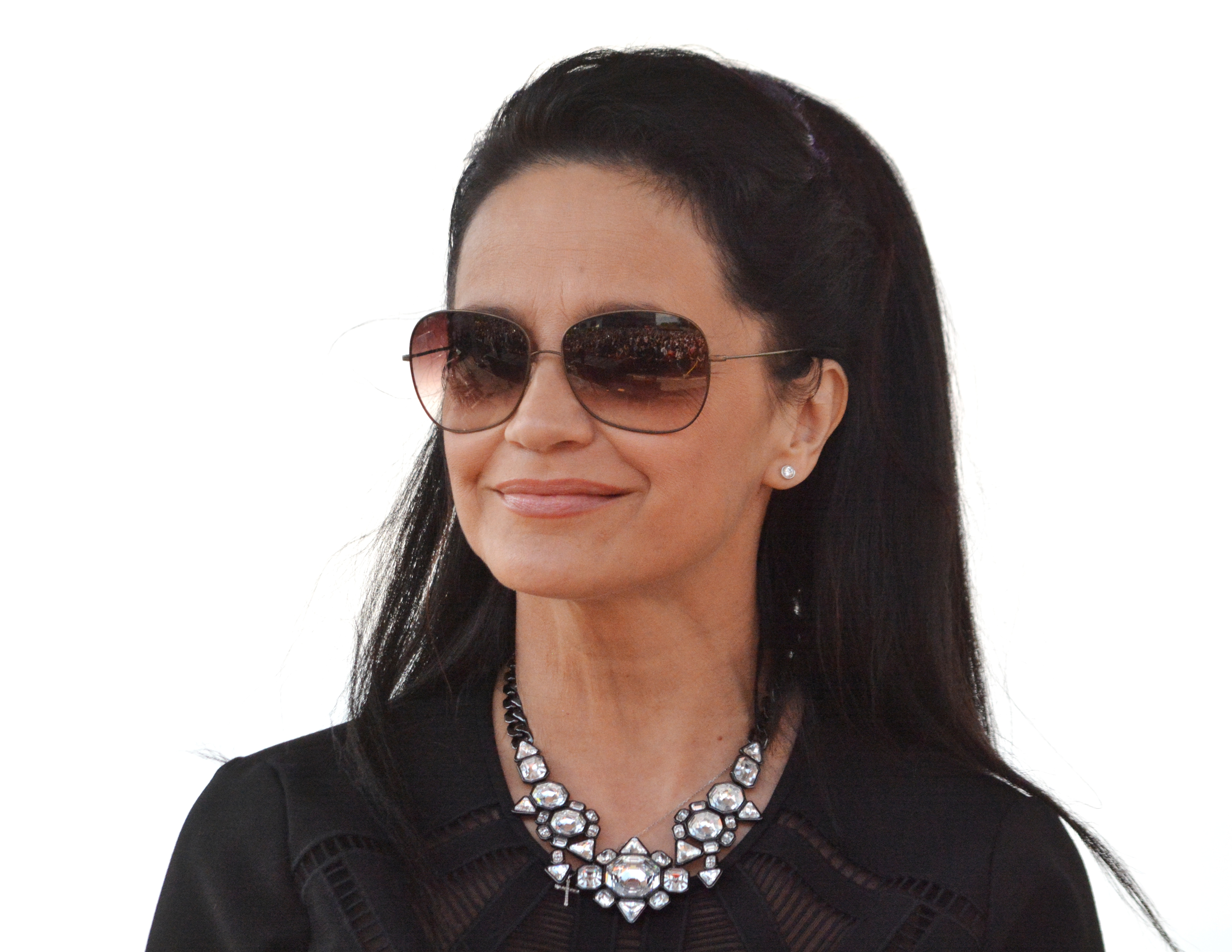
Lucie Bílá

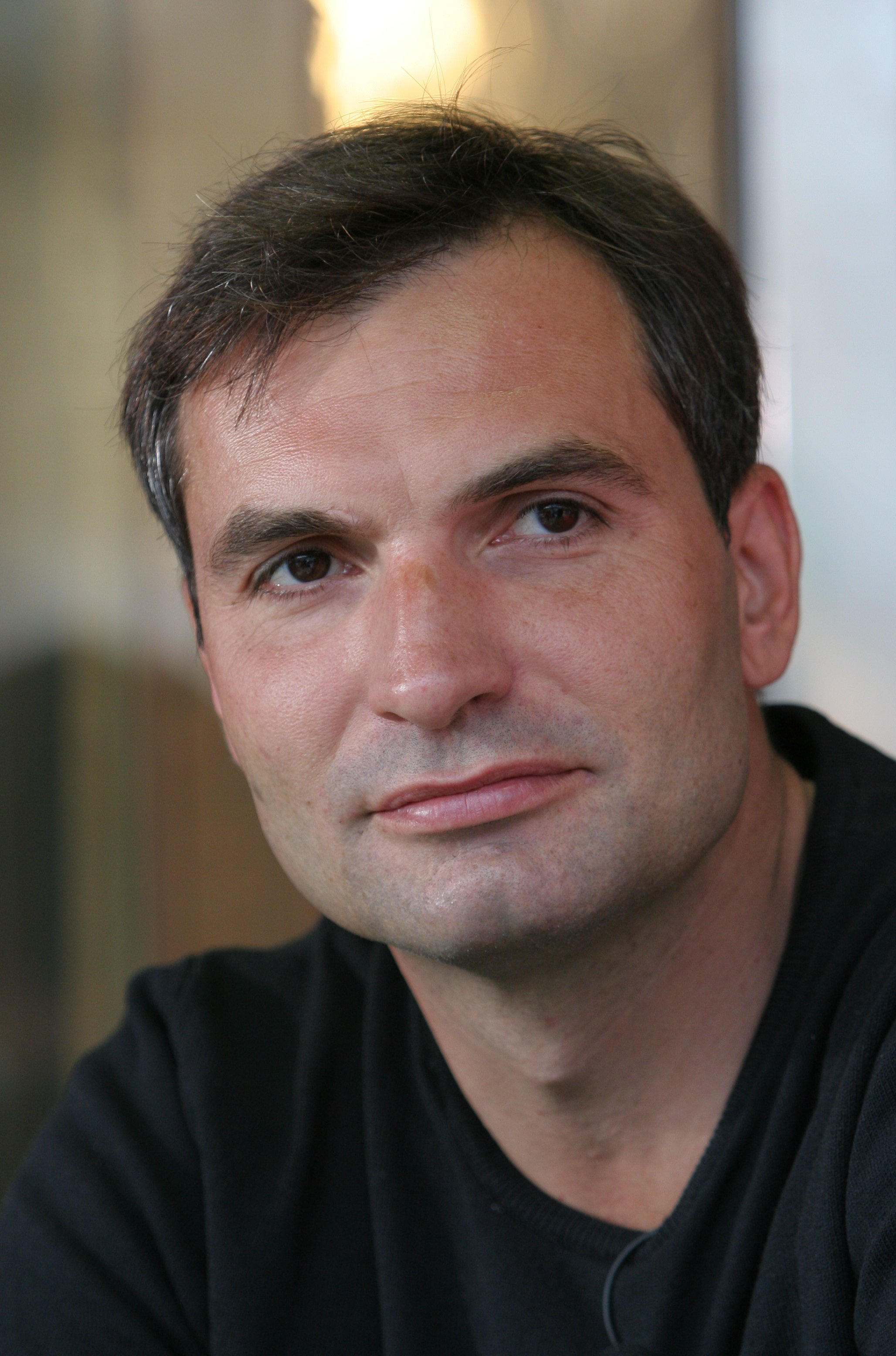
Jiří Macháček

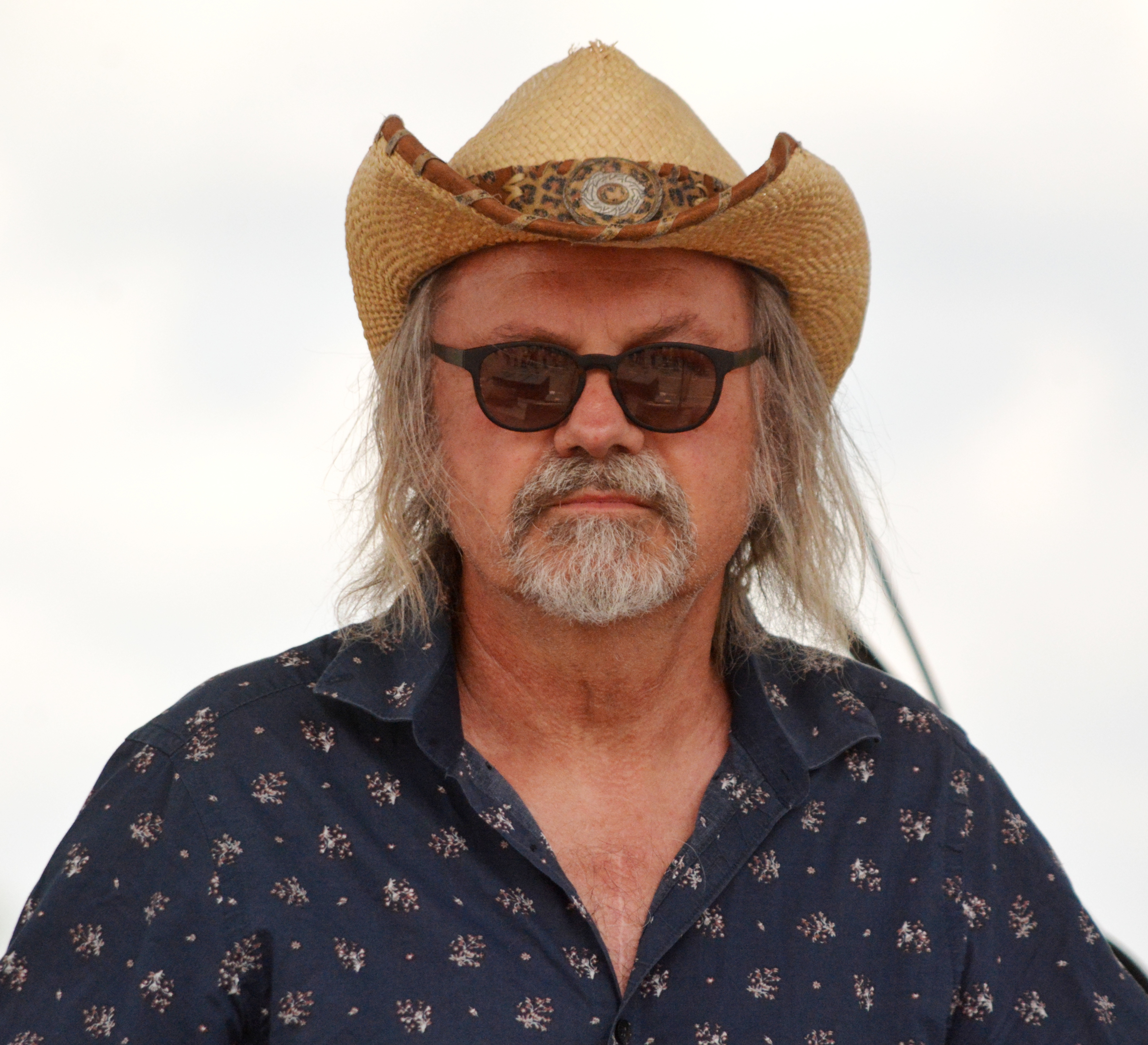
Ondřej Hejma

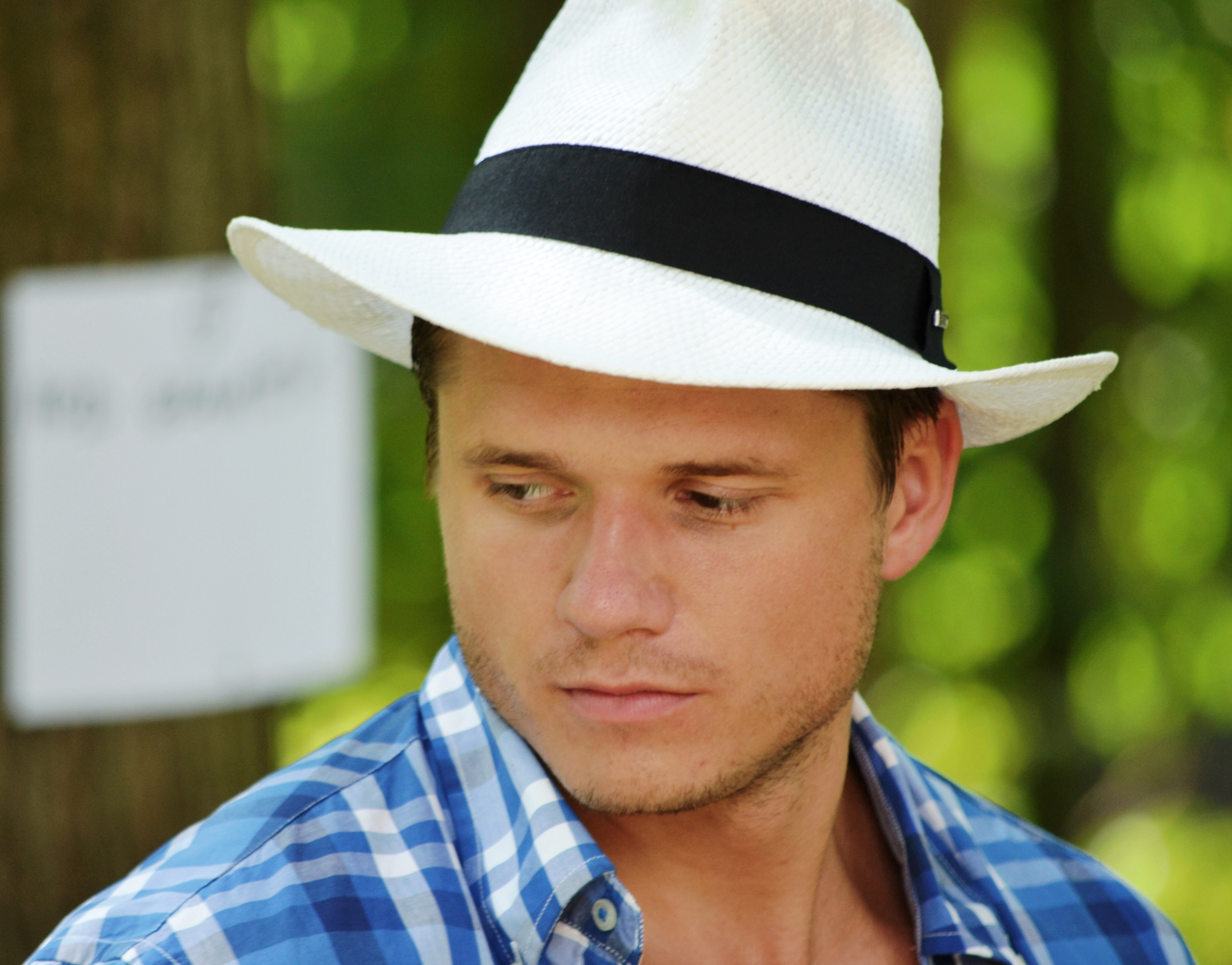
Ondřej Brzobohatý

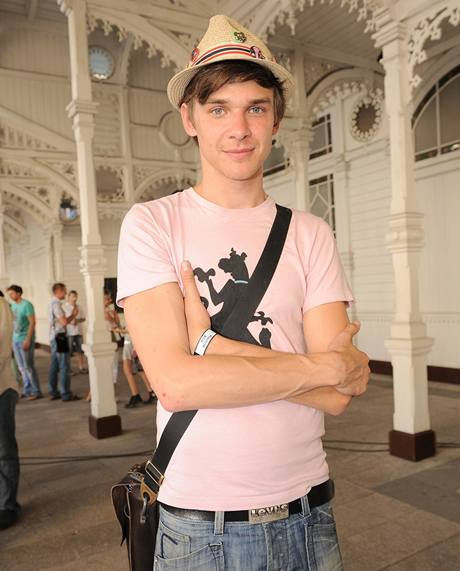
Vojtěch Dyk

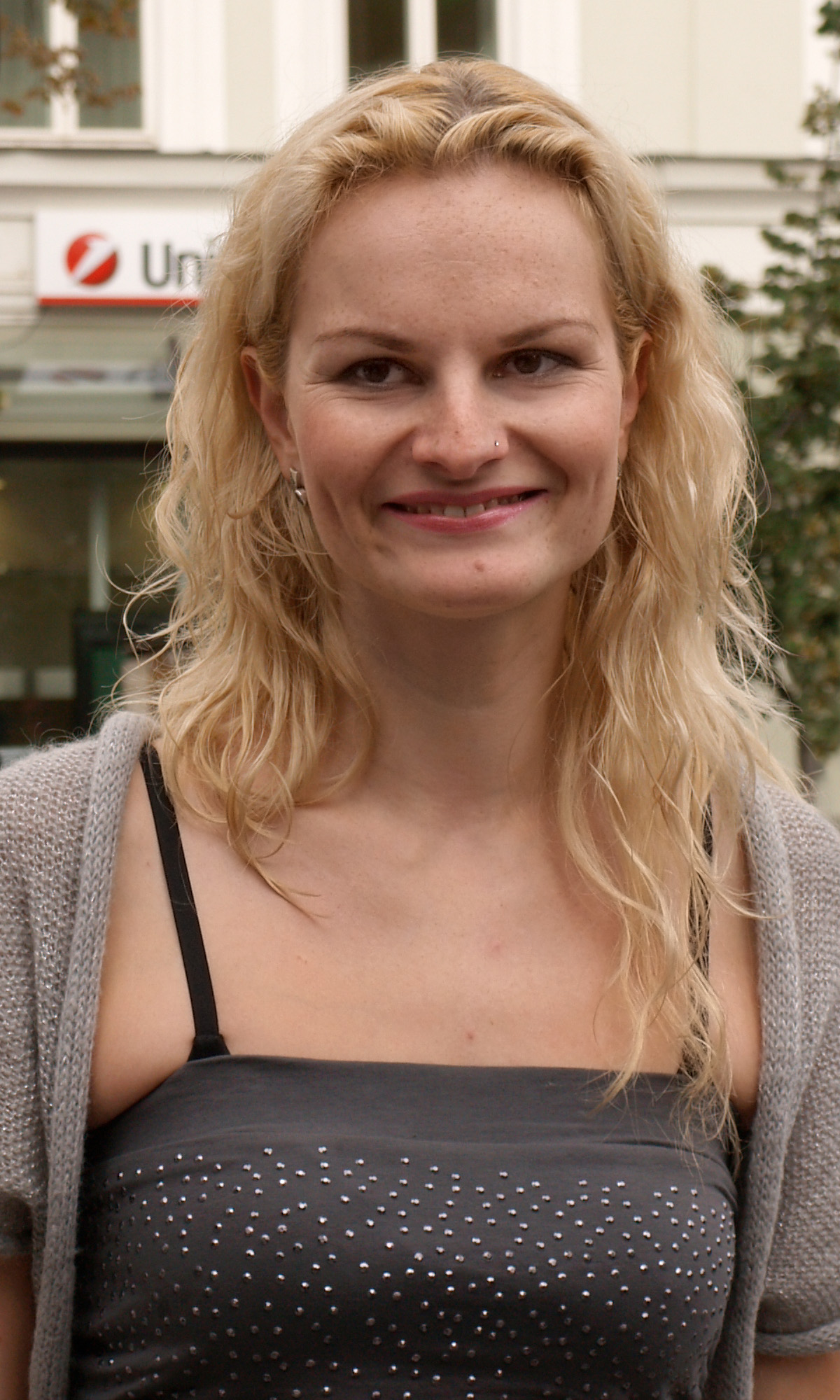
Iva Pazderková

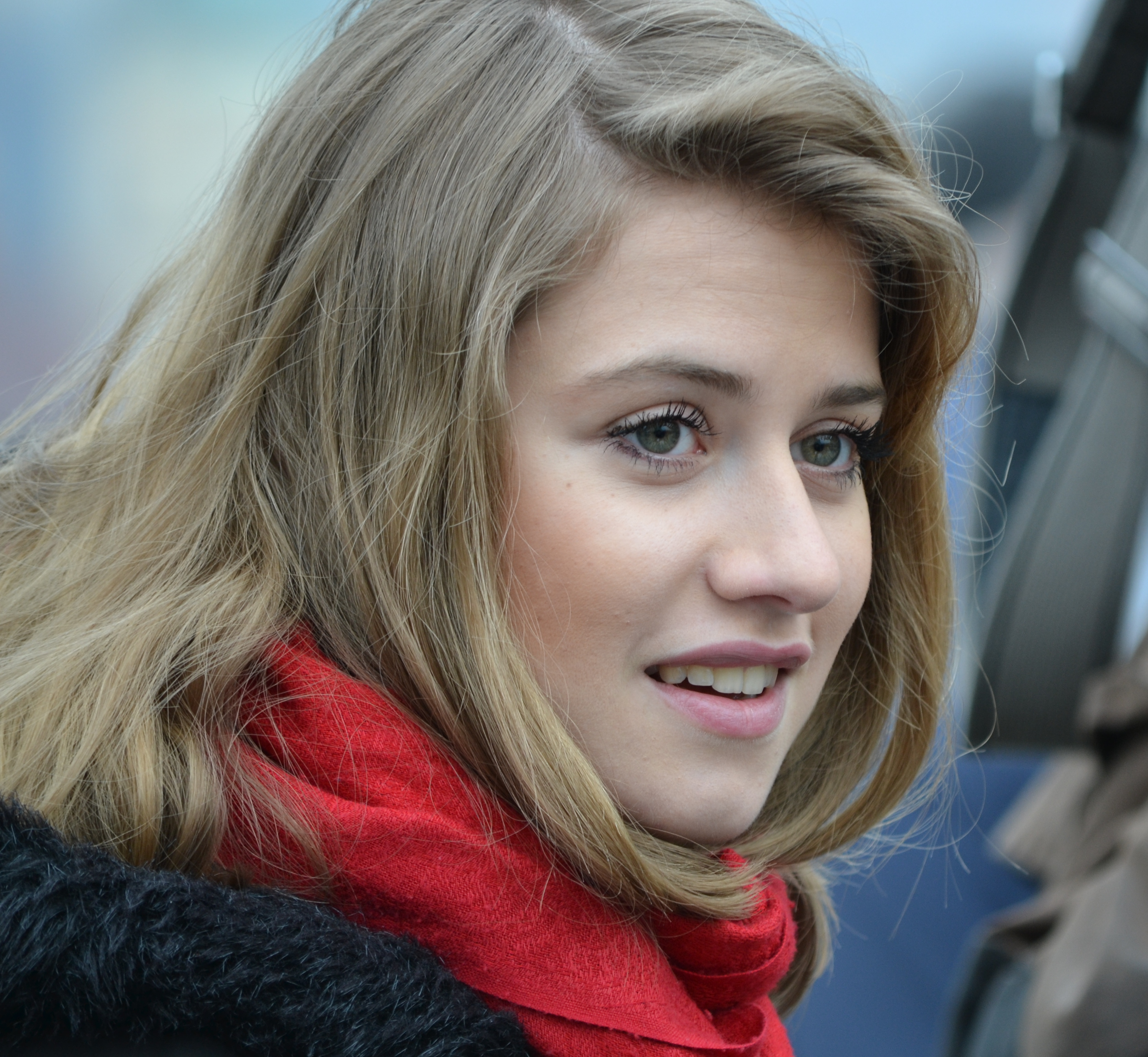
Emma Smetana

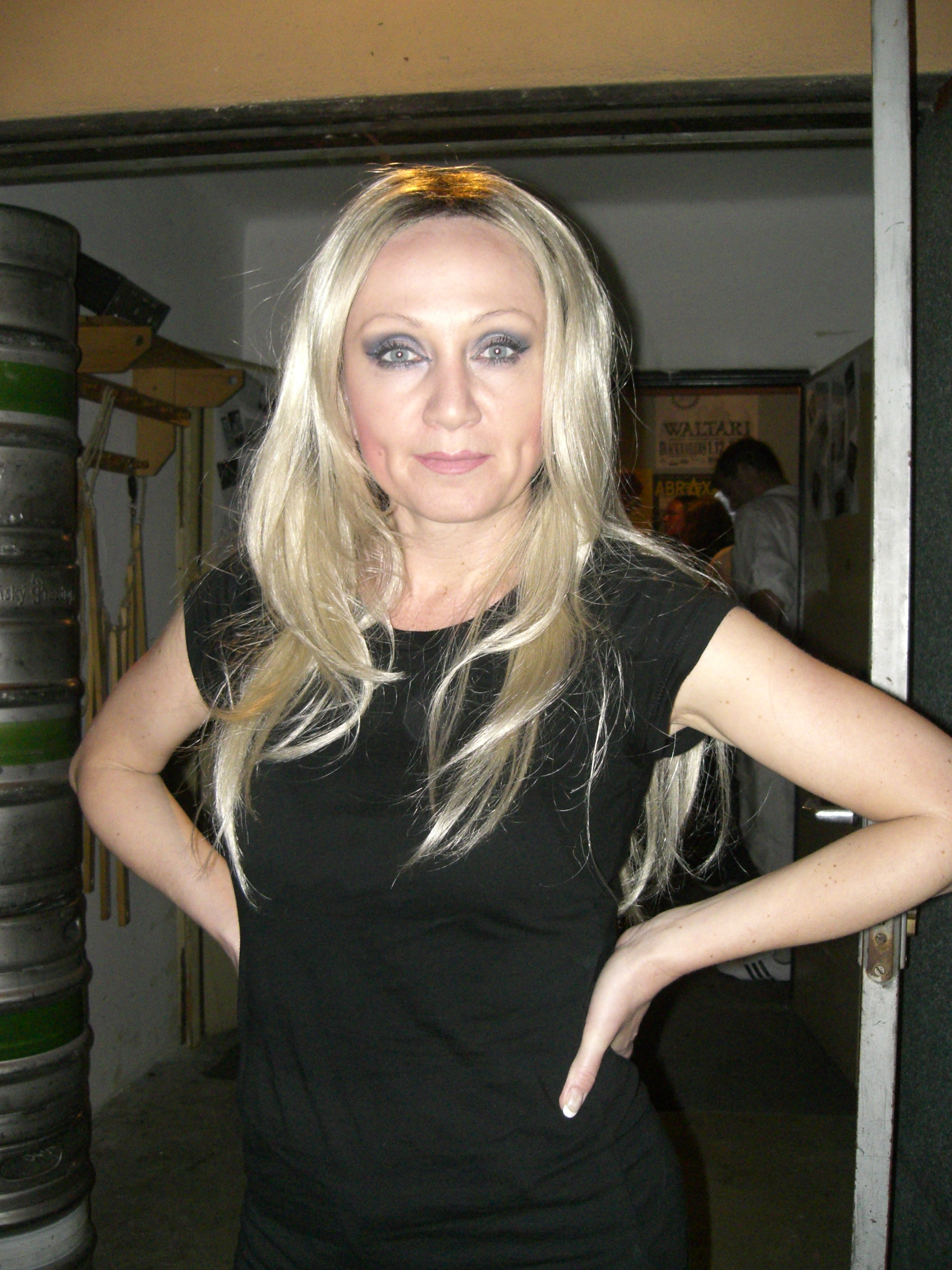
Barbara Basiková

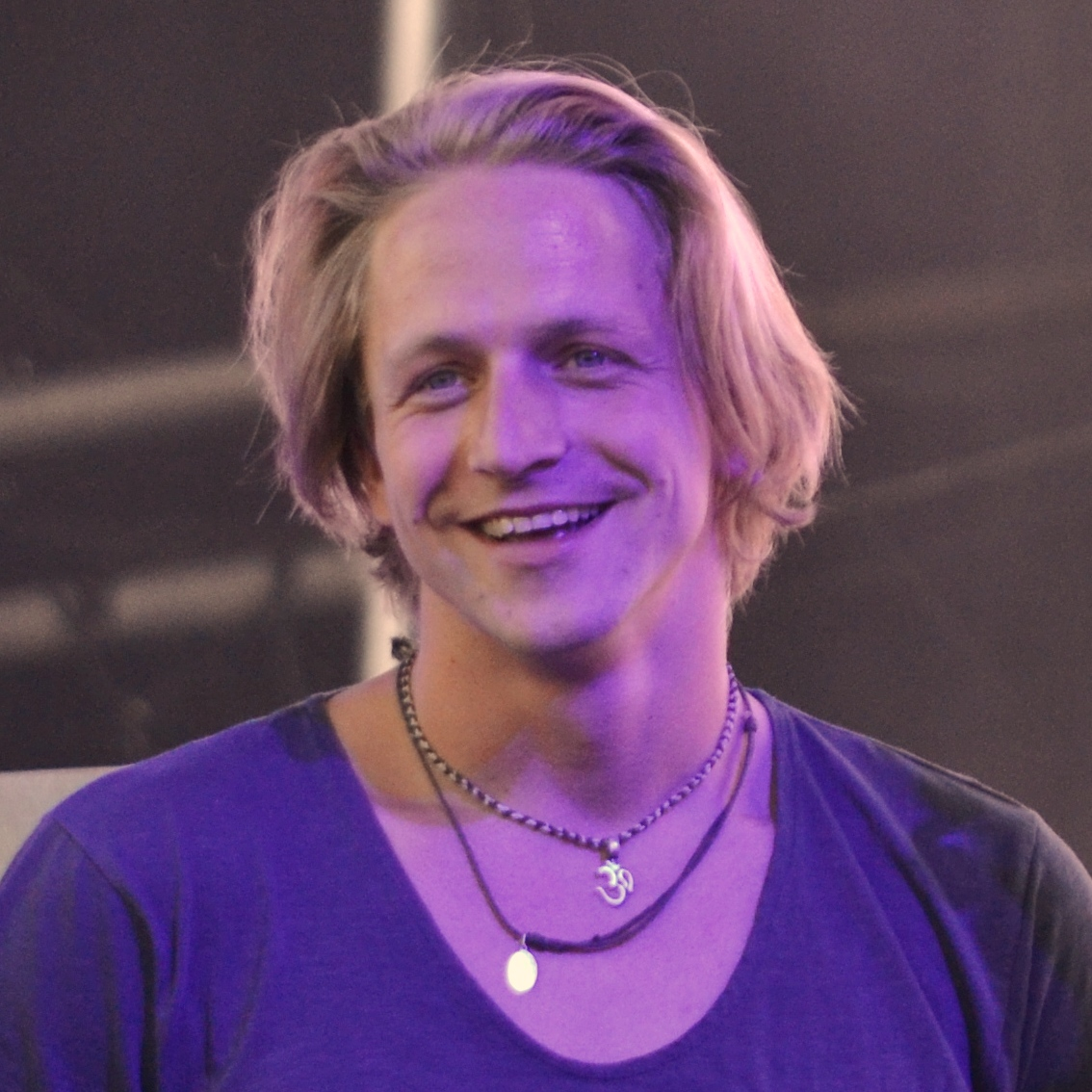
Tomáš Klus

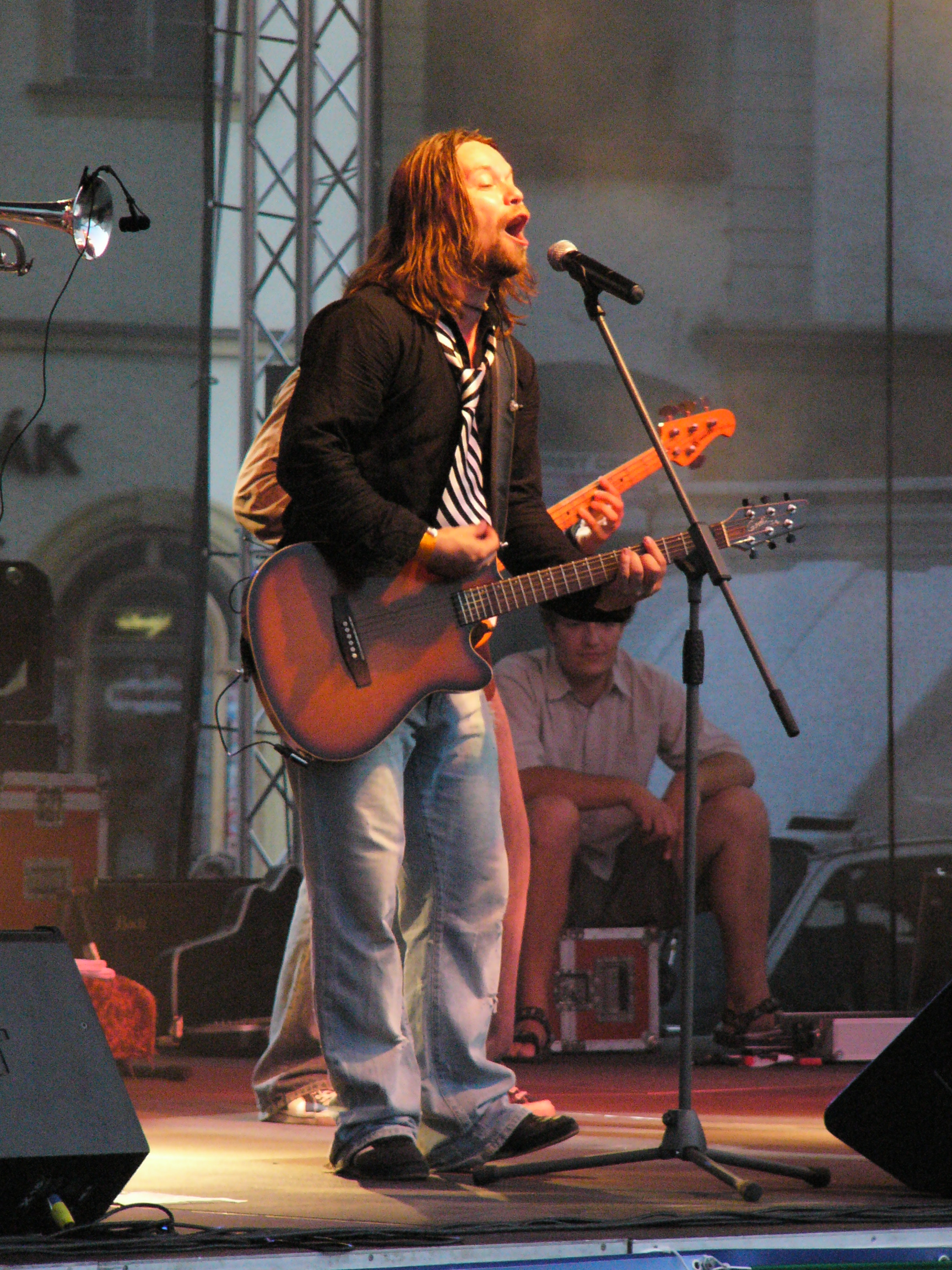
Richard Krajčo

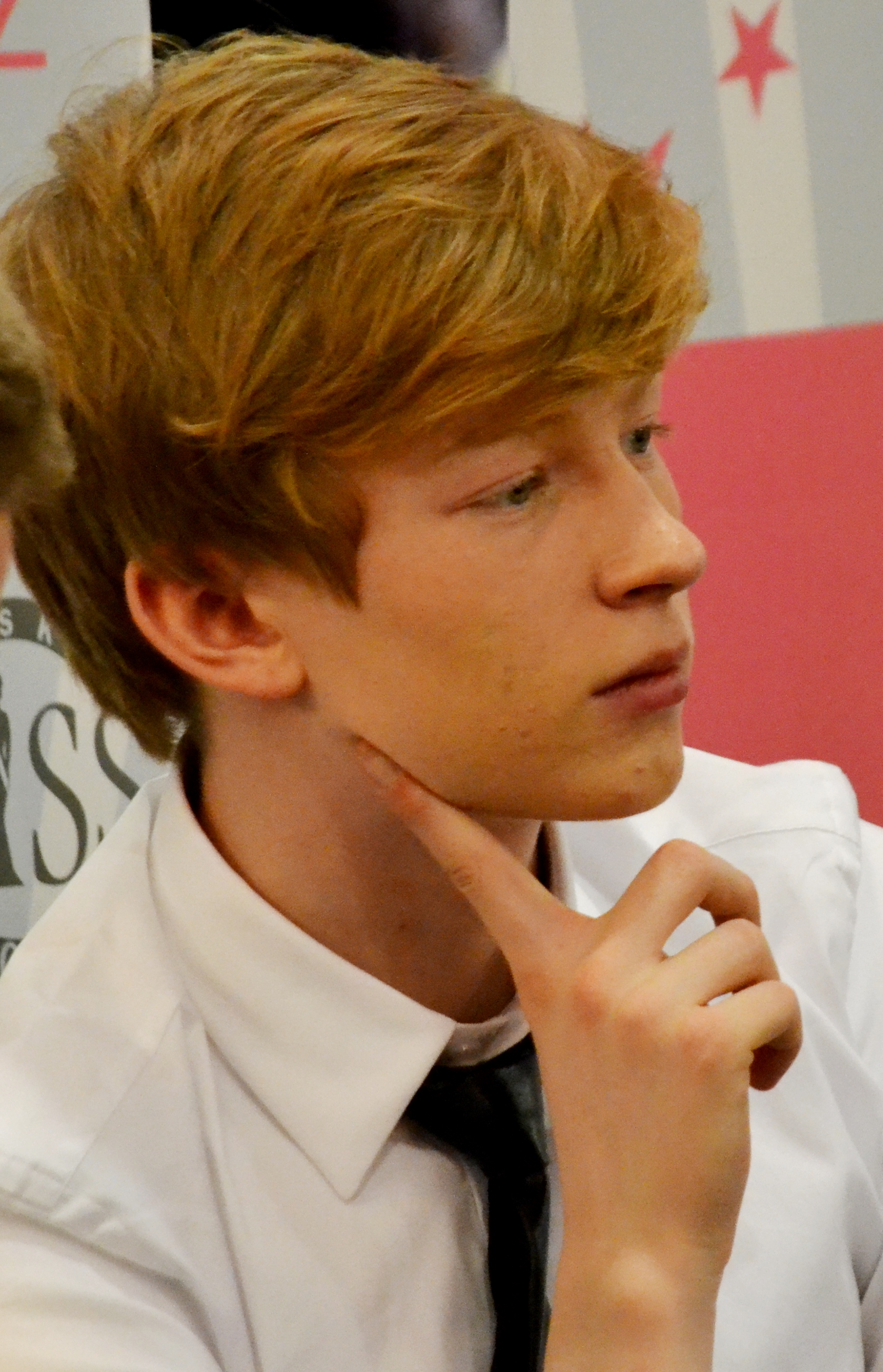
Adam Mišík

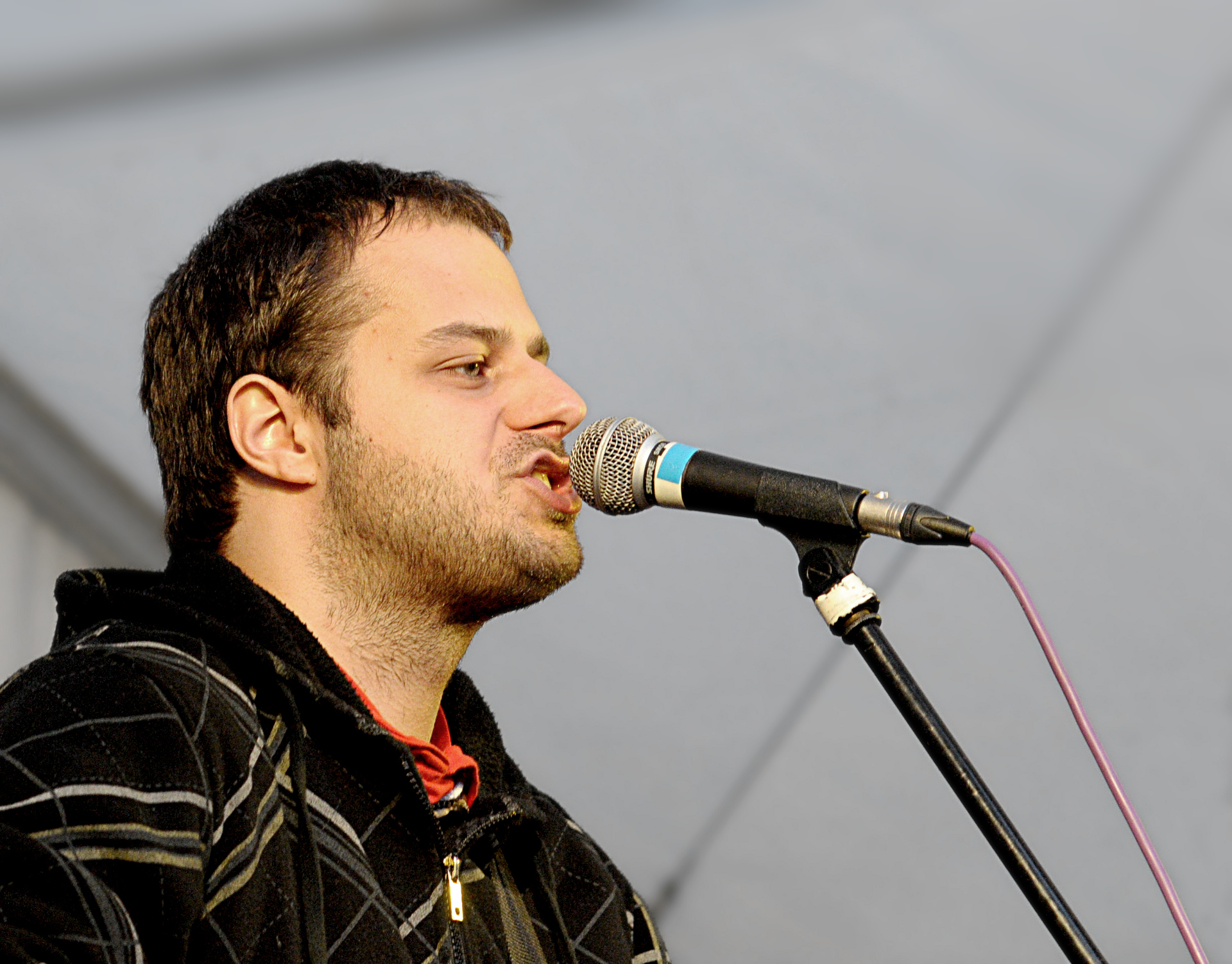
Xindl X

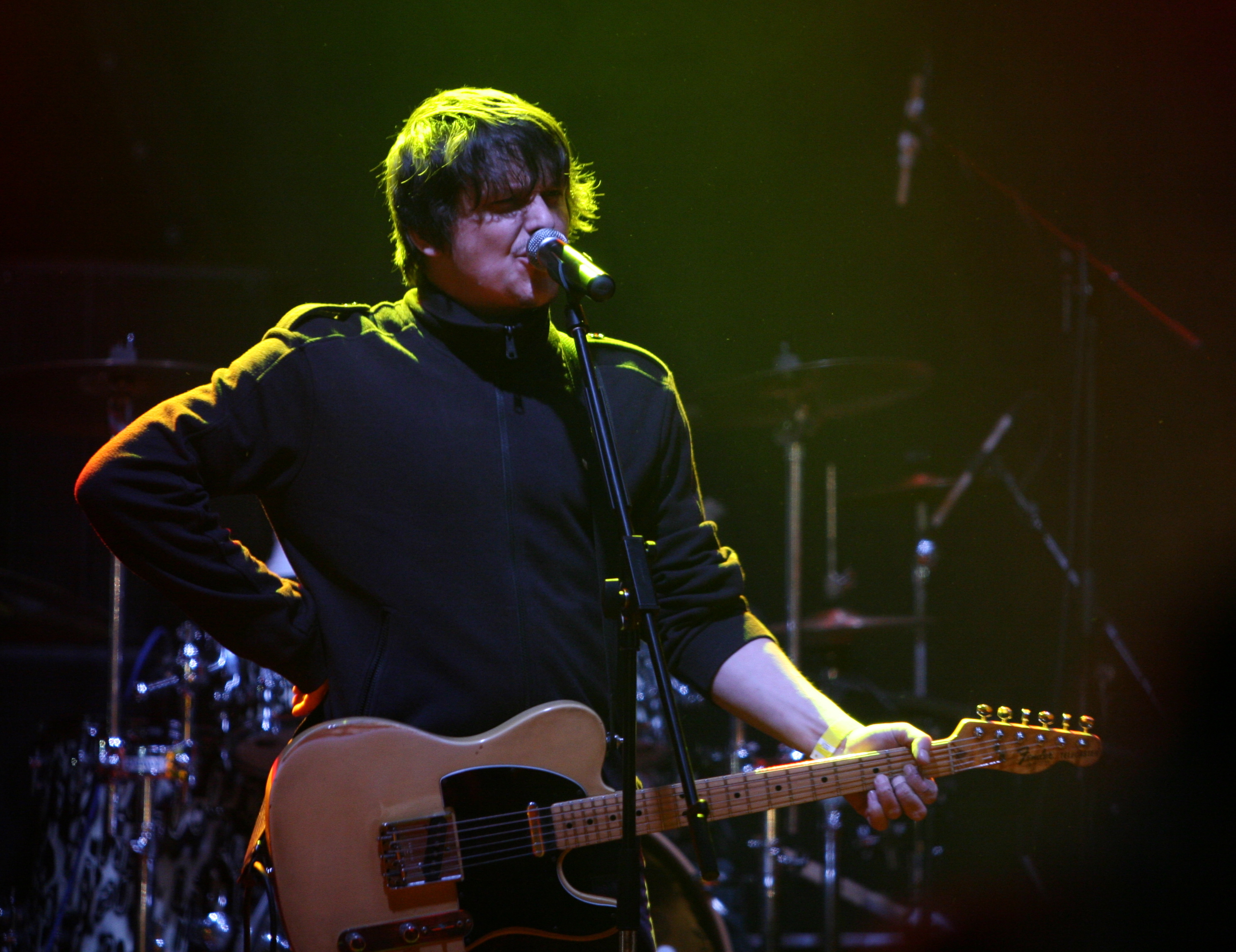
Michal Malátný

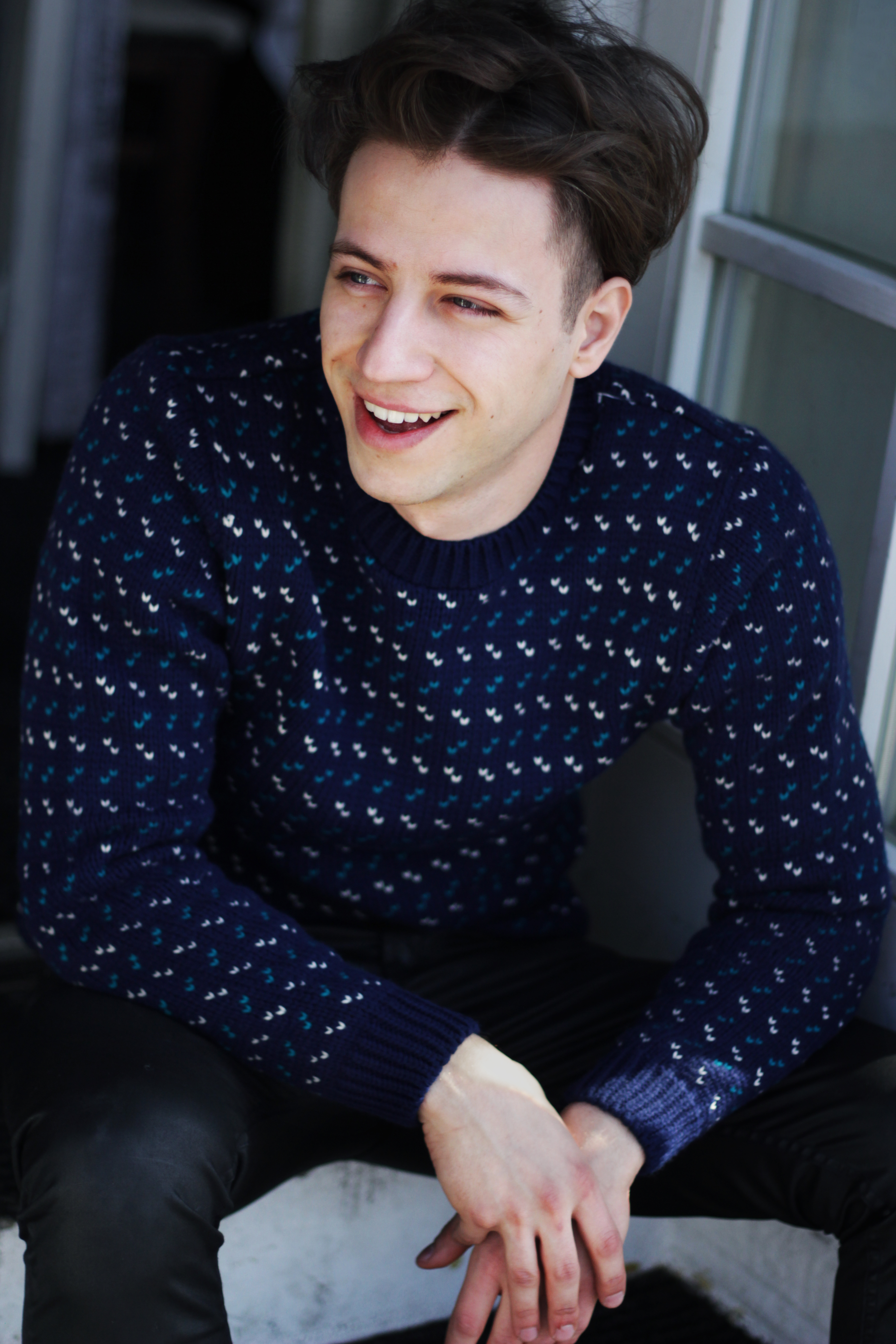
Milan Peroutka

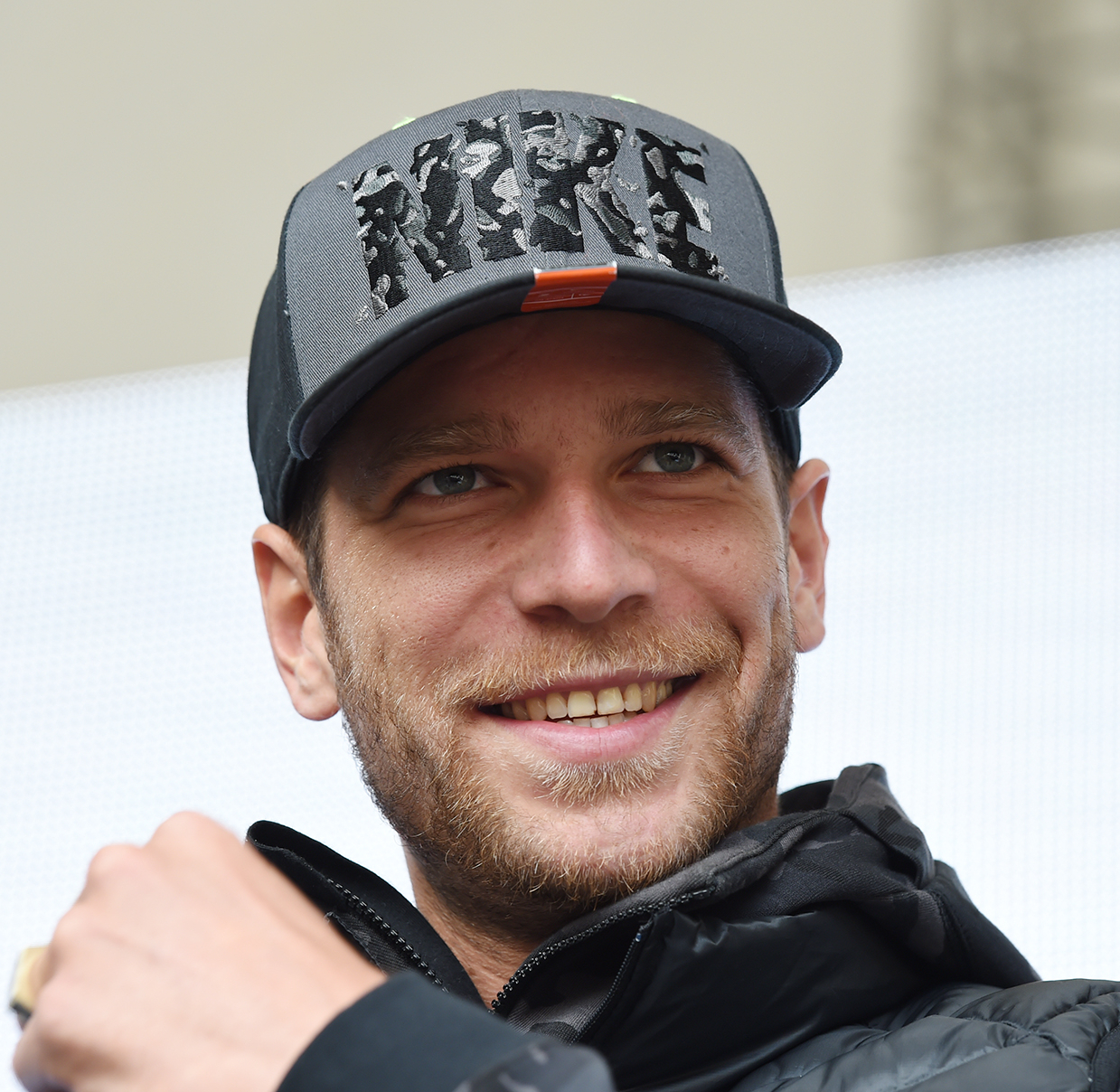
Majk Spirit

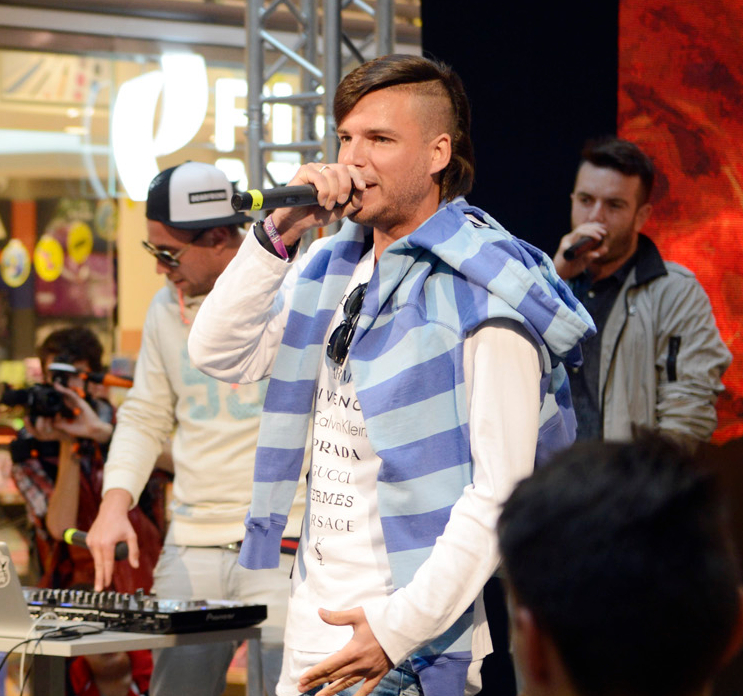
Ego
