= List of number-one albums of the 2020s (Czech Republic) =

This is a list of the albums ranked number one in the Czech Republic in the 2020s. The top-performing albums and EPs in the Czech Republic are ranked on the Albums – Top 100, which is published by the IFPI Czech Republic. The data is based on sales (both at retail and digital), and online streaming on Spotify, Apple Music, Google Play and Deezer.

== Chart history ==
Issue date	W#	Album	Artist(s)	W#1
2020
January 6	1	80/80 největší hity 1964-2019	Karel Gott	1
January 13	2	Černobílej svět	Viktor Sheen	2
January 27	4	Music to Be Murdered By	Eminem	2
February 10	6	Černobílej svět	Viktor Sheen	2
February 24	8	Changes	Justin Bieber	1
March 2	9	Ordinary Man	Ozzy Osbourne	1
March 9	10	Černobílej svět	Viktor Sheen	2
March 23	12	999	Karlo	1
March 30	13	After Hours	The Weeknd	1
April 6	14	Future Nostalgia	Dua Lipa	1
April 13	15	Černobílej svět	Viktor Sheen	3
May 4	18	Restart	Nik Tendo	3
May 25	21	Rap disco revoluce	Cashanova Bulhar	2
June 8	23	Chromatica	Lady Gaga	1
June 15	24	Černobílej svět	Viktor Sheen	1
June 22	25	Dori Dori Dori	Dorian	1
June 29	26	Pouzar	Robin Zoot	1
July 6	27	Original	Ektor	2
July 20	29	Legends Never Die	Juice Wrld	2
August 3	31	Folklore	Taylor Swift	1
August 10	32	Černobílej svět	Viktor Sheen	3
August 31	35	Teorie pádu	Stein27	3
September 21	38	Medusa II	Sergei Barracuda	1
September 28	39	Lunazar	Nik Tendo	1
October 5	40	Restart & Lunazar	Nik Tendo	3
October 26	43	Barvy	Viktor Sheen	3
November 16	46	Tváře smutnejch hrdinů	Škwor	1
November 23	47	Máma mi na krk dala klíč	Jaromír Nohavica	1
November 30	48	Barvy	Viktor Sheen	1
December 7	49	Prozyum	Yzomandias	2
December 21	51	Máma mi na krk dala klíč	Jaromír Nohavica	1
2021
January 4	52,53	Barvy	Viktor Sheen	7
February 22	7	Prozyum (Director's Cut)	Yzomandias	3
March 15	10	Barvy	Viktor Sheen	2
March 29	12	Justice	Justin Bieber	1
April 5	13	Stát ve stínu, dotýkat se hvězd	Koky	1
April 12	14	Barvy	Viktor Sheen	4
May 10	18	ČAUČESKU	Tomáš Klus	2
May 24	20	Bratan 2.0	Sensey	1
May 31	21	Sour	Olivia Rodrigo	1
June 7	22	Mohlo by to bejt nebe	Michal Prokop & Framus 5	1
June 14	23	Romeo	Ca$hanova Bulhar	2
June 28	25	Robby Trouble	Robin Zoot	1
July 5	26	Sour	Olivia Rodrigo	2
July 19	28	Backwoods Bred	Marpo	1
July 26	29	Sour	Olivia Rodrigo	2
August 9	31	Jsem v pohodě, sem v prdeli.	Nik Tendo	4
September 6	35	Donda	Kanye West	1
September 13	36	Dýchej	David Stypka & Bandjeez	1
September 20	37	Jsem v pohodě, sem v prdeli.	Nik Tendo	2
October 4	39	Noční obraz	VLADIMÍR MIŠÍK	2
October 18	41	Halywůd	Kryštof	1
October 25	42	Music of the Spheres	Coldplay	1
November 1	43	Obsidian	Jickson	1
November 8	44	=	Ed Sheeran	1
November 15	45	Voyage	ABBA	2
November 29	47	Příběhy a sny	Viktor Sheen	14
2022
March 7	9	J.Eden E-Gen	Yzomandias	2
March 21	11	Popstar	Calin	6
May 9	18	Zeit	Rammstein	1
May 16	19	Popstar	Calin	2
May 30	21	Harry's House	Harry Styles	1
June 6	22	Trappin Lonely	P T K	1
June 13	23	Mercury – Act 1	Imagine Dragons	1
June 20	24	Popstar	Calin	1
June 27	25	Dripolar	Ca$hanova Bulhar	2
July 11	27	Popstar	Calin	2
July 25	29	Harry's House	Harry Styles	1
August 1	30	Popstar	Calin	5
September 5	35	S úctou (Zlatá kolekce)	Hana Zagorová	1
September 12	36	J.Eden E-Gen	Yzomandias	1
September 19	37	Patient Number 9	Ozzy Osbourne	1
September 26	38	Příběhy a sny	Viktor Sheen	2
October 10	40	Make Sudety Great Again	Robin Zoot	1
October 17	41	Příběhy a sny	Viktor Sheen	1
October 24	42	City Park	58G	1
October 31·	43	Midnights	Taylor Swift	2
November 14	45	El Presidento	Kabát	2
November 28	47	Kruhy & Vlny	Yzomandias and Nik Tendo	3
December 19	50	El Presidento	Kabát	1
December 26	51	Příběhy a sny	Viktor Sheen	5
2023
January 30	4	Rush!	Måneskin	1
February 6	5	Golden Hill	P T K	1
February 13	6	Roadtrip	Calin and Viktor Sheen	9
April 17	15	Kruhy & vlny (217 Twins Edition)	Yzomandias & Nik Tendo	1
April 24	16	Roadtrip	Calin and Viktor Sheen	8
June 19	24	Krtek Forever	Milion Plus & Yzomandias & Nik Tendo	1
June 26	25	Roadtrip	Calin and Viktor Sheen	5
July 31	30	Pattern	Nik Tendo and Nobody Listen	1
August 7	31	Utopia	Travis Scott	2
August 21	33	Roadtrip	Calin and Viktor Sheen	2
September 4	35	President of Sexico	Stein27	3
September 25	38	Zpátky na svojí planetu	Yzomandias	2
October 9	40	Silent Kill	P T K	1
October 16	41	Sobě věrnej	ŠKWOR	1
October 23	42	Planeta opic	Viktor Sheen	9
December 26	51	Vánoční koledy, Vol. 1	DĚTSKÝ SBOR CAMERATA - B.M.S	2
2024
January 8	1	Planeta opic	Viktor Sheen	2
January 22	3	Ponya	Robin Zoot	2
February 5	5	Planeta opic	Viktor Sheen	2
February 19	7	Vultures 1	Kanye West and Ty Dolla Sign	1
February 26	8	Planeta opic	Viktor Sheen	4
March 25	12	Tentokrát	Grey256	1
April 1	13	We Don't Trust You	Future and Metro Boomin	1
April 8	14	Planeta opic	Viktor Sheen	2
April 22	16	Paranoia	Yzomandias	1
April 29	17	The Tortured Poets Department	Taylor Swift	4
May 27	21	Hit Me Hard and Soft	Billie Eilish	2
June 10	23	Bieber Fever	Calin	6
July 22	29	The Death of Slim Shady (Coup de Grâce)	Eminem	1
July 29	30	Bieber Fever	Calin	5
September 2	35	Short n' Sweet	Sabrina Carpenter	2
September 16	37	Luck and Strange	David Gilmour	1
September 23	38	v gastru nejsou lidi	Nik Tendo	4
October 21	42	Vteřiny, měsíce a roky	Vladimír Mišík	1
October 28	43	Global	Hard Rico	3
November 18	46	Imposter Syndrom	Viktor Sheen	5
December 23	51	Justin Bieber Fever Live Tour	Calin	2
2025
January 6	1	Imposter Syndrom	Viktor Sheen	10
March 17	11	Mayhem	Lady Gaga	1
March 24	12	Music	Playboi Carti	2
April 7	14	Neviem	Separ	4
May 5	18	Ja, Sara	Sara Vikas	6
June 17	24	Brat	Pil C & Luca Brassi10x	1
June 23	25	Ja, Sara	Sara Vikas	1
June 30	26	Khaosan	Ben Cristovao and Sofian Medjmedi	4
July 28	30	Painkillers (Overdose version)	P T K & Yzomandias	2
August 11	32	Goldkiid	Nik Tendo and Decky	1
August 18	33	Painkillers (Overdose version)	P T K & Yzomandias	1
August 25	34	KPop Demon Hunters	Huntrix	2
September 8	36	Rookie of the Year	Ginter	1
September 15	37	KPop Demon Hunters	Huntrix	2
September 29	39	Ja, Sara	Sara Vikas	2
October 13	41	The Life of a Showgirl	Taylor Swift	1
October 20	42	Karakoram	P T K	4
November 17	46	Já, mé druhé já a Kristýna	Buka	14
2026
February 23	8	Majitel	Robin	1
March 2	9	Já, mé druhé já a Kristýna	Buka	2
March 16	11	Kiss All the Time. Disco, Occasionally	Harry Styles	1
March 23	12	Karakoram	P T K	1
March 30	13	Arirang	BTS	1
April 6	14	Já, mé druhé já a Kristýna	Buka	6
May 18	20	Karakoram	P T K	1
May 25	21	Karakoram DLC	P T K	4
June 22	25	ADHD Pop	Ewa Farna	1
June 29	26	Exit U Palice	Yzomandias	17
October 26	43	Na hraně	Škwor	1
November 2	44	Exit U Palice	Yzomandias	3

== Longest-running number-one albums ==
The list features longest-running number-one albums, according to the amount of weeks they spend at number one in the decade.

#	Album	Artist(s)	Released	W#1	Ref.
1	Roadtrip.	Calin and Viktor Sheen	August 9, 2021	24	
2	Příběhy a sny	Viktor Sheen	August 29, 2021	22	
3	Já, mé druhé já a Kristýna	Buka	November 17, 2025	22	
4	Exit U Palice	Yzomandias	June 26, 2026	20	
5	Planeta opic	Viktor Sheen	October 23, 2023	19	
6	Barvy	Viktor Sheen	October 17, 2020	17	
7	Popstar.	Calin	March 21, 2022	16	
8	Imposter Syndrom	Viktor Sheen	November 18, 2024	15	
9	Černobílej svět	Viktor Sheen	May 17, 2019	13	
10	Bieber Fever.	Calin	August 9, 2021	11	
