= List of number-one albums of the 2010s (Czech Republic) =

This is a list of the albums ranked number one in the Czech Republic in the 2010s. The top-performing albums and EPs in the Czech Republic are ranked on the Albums – Top 100, which is published by the IFPI Czech Republic. The data is based on sales (both at retail and digital), and online streaming on Spotify, Apple Music, Google Play and Deezer.

== Chart history ==
W#	Album	Artist(s)	W#1
2014
1	Český kalendář	Michal Horáček	2
3	High Hopes	Bruce Springsteen	2
5	Já hledám štěstí (Zlatá kolekce)	Eva Olmerová	1
6	Hydra	Within Temptation	1
7	Navždy	Kontrafakt	2
9	Šlitr zpívá Šlitra	Jiří Šlitr	1
10	Jarek Nohavica a přátelé	Jaromír Nohavica	1
11	Gaia	Radůza	2
13	Proměnamě	Tomáš Klus	9
22	Ghost Stories	Coldplay	2
24	Proměnamě	Tomáš Klus	1
25	The Hunting Party	Linkin Park	1
26	Iveta naposledy	Iveta Bartošová	3
29	Proměnamě	Tomáš Klus	1
30	Redeemer of Souls	Judas Priest	1
31	Proměnamě	Tomáš Klus	4
35	Stripped	Rolling Stones	1
36	Tři bratři O.S.T.	Various	4
40	Popular Problems	Leonard Cohen	2
42	Songs of Innocence	U2	1
43	Segrado	Michal Horáček, František Segrado	1
44	Rockfield	Chinaski	2
46	The Endless River	Pink Floyd	4
50	Na Radosti	Aneta Langerová	3
2015
1	Tři bratři O.S.T.	Various	5
6	(W)inna?	Ewa Farna	1
7	Shadows in the Night	Bob Dylan	1
8	Tři bratři O.S.T.	Various	1
9	Physical Graffiti	Led Zeppelin	1
10	Punkový království	Visací zámek	1
11	Rebel Heart	Madonna	1
12	Punkový království	Visací zámek	1
13	Československo	David Koller	1
14	Endless Forms Most Beautiful	Nightwish	1
15	Československo	David Koller	2
17	Na Radosti	Aneta Langerová	1
18	Bratříčku, zavírej vrátka	Karel Kryl	2
20	Marathon (Příběh běžce)	Radůza	2
22	Do pekla do nebe	Kabát	1
23	Srdcebeat	Kryštof	4
27	Anat život není	Tomáš Klus	2
29	Srdcebeat	Kryštof	8
37	The Book Of Souls	Iron Maiden	2
39	Rattle That Lock	David Gilmour	2
41	Duety 1962-2015	Karel Gott	1
42	A/B	Tata Bojs	1
43	Srdcebeat	Kryštof	2
45	Duety 1962-2015	Karel Gott	1
46	Srdcebeat	Kryštof	1
47	Katarze	Slza	1
48	25	Adele	6
2016
1	25	Adele	1
2	Blackstar	David Bowie	5
7	Beatline 1967-1969	Various	1
8	The Astonishing	Dream Theater	1
9	Lone Survivor	Marpo	1
10	Hrrr na ně... / ...nám se líbí...	Jiří Schelinger	3
13	Žár trvá / Továrna na sny	Laura a její tygři	1
14	Hana	Lucie Bílá	3
17	Srdcebeat	Kryštof	2
19	Lemonade	Beyoncé	1
20	Cloud Nine	Kygo	1
21	I Still Do	Eric Clapton	1
22	Gold	Team	1
23	Good Karma	Roxette	1
24	Pure McCartney	Paul McCartney	1
25	The Getaway	Red Hot Chili Peppers	2
27	California	Blink-182	1
28	The Getaway	Red Hot Chili Peppers	1
29	Smrt žije	Prago Union	5
34	The Last Stand	Sabaton	1
35	Glory	Britney Spears	1
36	O Lásce	Hana Zagorová	1
37	Hearts	Lenny	2
39	40 slavíků	Karel Gott	2
41	Beztíže	Priessnitz	1
42	40 slavíků	Karel Gott	2
44	You Want It Darker	Leonard Cohen	1
45	40 slavíků	Karel Gott	1
46	You Want It Darker	Leonard Cohen	1
47	Hardwired...To Self-Destruct	Metallica	1
48	You Want It Darker	Leonard Cohen	1
49	Blue & Lonesome	The Rolling Stones	1
50	You Want It Darker	Leonard Cohen	3
2017
1	Starboy	The Weeknd	3
4	Big Beatline 1965-1968	Various	2
6	Human	Rag'n'Bone Man	1
7	Big Beatline 1965-1968	Various	1
8	Vladimír Mišík (Jubilejní edice)	Vladimír Mišík	1
9	Meditace & relaxace s klasickou hudbou	Various	1
10	÷	Ed Sheeran	2
12	Spirit	Depeche Mode	1
13	÷	Ed Sheeran	3
16	Živ je	Tomáš Klus	1
17	÷	Ed Sheeran	2
19	Není nám do pláče	Chinaski	1
20	Harry Styles	Harry Styles	1
21	One More Light	Linkin Park	1
22	÷	Ed Sheeran	1
23	Is This The Life We Really Want?	Roger Waters	2
25	÷	Ed Sheeran	1
26	25	Kryštof	1
27	Evolve	Imagine Dragons	1
28	÷	Ed Sheeran	1
29	Evolve	Imagine Dragons	1
30	One More Light	Linkin Park	2
32	Evolve	Imagine Dragons	3
35	25	Kryštof	1
36	÷	Ed Sheeran	2
38	Concrete and Gold	Foo Fighters	1
39	Star Boys	Těžkej pokondr	1
40	Live At Pompeii	David Gilmour	1
41	÷	Ed Sheeran	1
42	Beautiful Trauma	Pink	2
44	Bílé Vánoce Lucie Bílé 2	Lucie Bílá	1
45	Uzavřenej kruh	Škwor	1
46	Poruba	Jaromír Nohavica	7
2018
1	÷	Ed Sheeran	3
4	Po půlnoci	Mandrage	1
5	÷	Ed Sheeran	1
6	Man Of The Woods	Justin Timberlake	1
7	÷	Ed Sheeran	3
10	Dead Man Walking	Marpo	1
11	Všechno je proměnlivé / Zakázané koncerty 1974-1981	Petr Skoumal, Jan Vodňanský	1
12	?	XXXTentacion	1
13	Ze.mě	Barbora Poláková	1
14	÷	Ed Sheeran	1
15	Evolve	Imagine Dragons	2
17	Restart	Rest	1
18	Sbohem Roxano	Yzomandias	2
20	Beerbongs & Bentleys	Post Malone	4
24	Ta pravá	Karel Gott	2
26	?	XXXTentacion	1
27	Scorpion	Drake	4
31	Grál	Viktor Sheen, Jickson	1
32	Astroworld	Travis Scott	2
34	Sweetener	Ariana Grande	2
36	Kamikaze	Eminem	1
37	Spolu	Tomáš Klus	1
38	Kamikaze	Eminem	1
39	Já nemám strach	Hana Zagorová	1
40	÷	Ed Sheeran	1
41	Trench	Twenty One Pilots	1
42	A Star Is Born	Lady Gaga, Bradley Cooper	3
45	Muzikál	Marián Vojtko	1
46	EvoLucie	Lucie	3
49	Kryštof na Strahově (Live)	Kryštof	1
50	EvoLucie	Lucie	1
51	Bohemian Rhapsody O.S.T.	Queen	2
2019
01	Bohemian Rhapsody O.S.T.	Queen	6
07	Thank U, Next	Ariana Grande	2
09	Bohemian Rhapsody O.S.T.	Queen	1
10	A Star Is Born	Lady Gaga, Bradley Cooper	1
11	Bohemian Rhapsody O.S.T.	Queen	3
14	When We All Fall Asleep, Where Do We Go?	Billie Eilish	4
18	Hasan	Hasan	2
20	When We All Fall Asleep, Where Do We Go?	Billie Eilish	1
21	Černobílej svět	Viktor Sheen	2
23	J. Eden Dva	Yzomandias	1
24	Černobílej svět	Viktor Sheen	5
29	No.6 Collaborations Project	Ed Sheeran	4
33	Černobílej svět	Viktor Sheen	1
34	When We All Fall Asleep, Where Do We Go?	Billie Eilish	2
36	Černobílej svět	Viktor Sheen	1
37	Hollywood's Bleeding	Post Malone	2
39	Jednou tě potkám	Vladimír Mišík	1
40	80/80 největší hity 1964-2019	Karel Gott	5
45	Fatamorgana	Nik Tendo	1
46	80/80 největší hity 1964-2019	Karel Gott	7

== Longest-running number-one album by year ==
The list features longest-running number-one albums, according to the amount of weeks they spend at number one in the year.

year	Album	Artist(s)	W#1	Ref.
2014	Proměnamě	Tomáš Klus	15	
2015	Srdcebeat	Kryštof	15	
2016	You Want It Darker	Leonard Cohen	6	
2017	÷	Ed Sheeran	13	
2018	÷	Ed Sheeran	9	
2019	80/80 největší hity 1964-2019	Karel Gott	12	
