= Mandrage =

Czech pop rock band

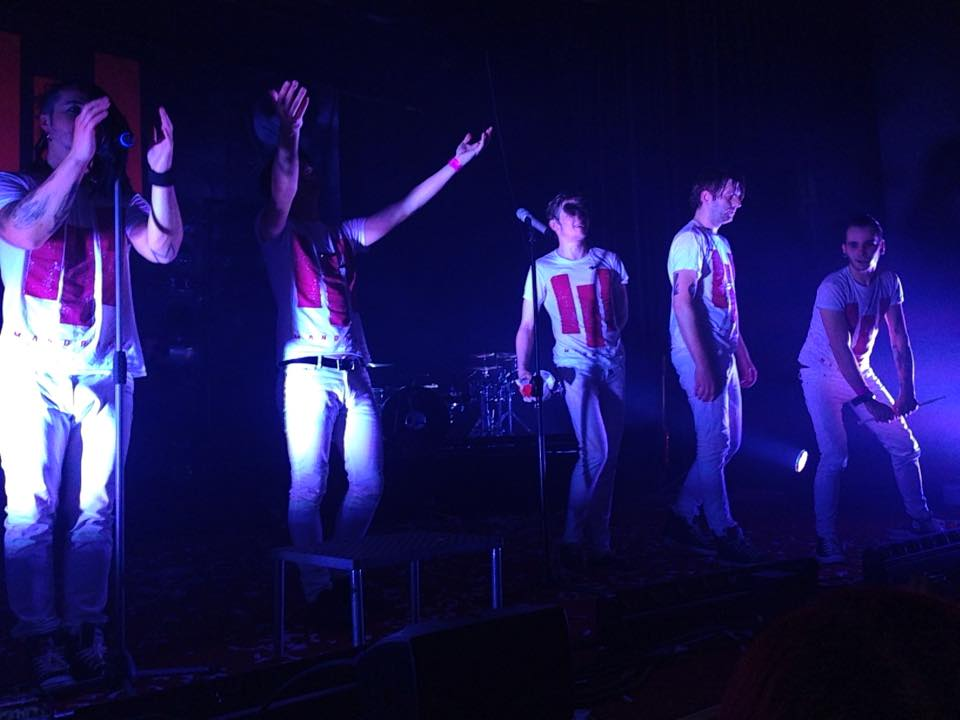
- Mandrage performing in 2014

Background information
- Also known as: MNDRG
- Origin: Plzeň, Czech Republic
- Genres: Pop rock
- Years active: 2001–2020
- Label: Universal
- Past members: Vít Starý; Matyáš Vorda; Josef Bolan; Michal Faitl; František Bořík
- Website: mandrage.cz

Mandrage was a Czech pop rock band from Plzeň, active between 2001 and 2020. The group consisted of Vít Starý (vocals, guitar) Matyáš Vorda (drums), Josef Bolan (vocals, guitar), Michal Faitl (bass), and František Bořík (keyboards). Their biggest hits include "Šrouby a matice", "Františkovy lázně", "Hledá se žena", "Na dlani", and "Motýli".

== History ==
=== Early days: 2001–2004 ===
In 2001, the fathers of Vít Starý and Matyáš Vorda, who were in a band called Mediterian, encouraged their sons to come on stage and perform a few songs together. The two boys, who were introduced by the band's vocalist as Mandraže (the spelling of which was later changed to Mandrage), decided to play one of their dads' songs as well as "Wonderwall" by Oasis.

Between 2002 and 2003, the duo performed with some of their friends, none of whom stayed with the group for long, however. Starý and Vorda began writing original songs and took part in local music competitions. They eventually met Josef Bolan and Michal Faitl, both of whom were playing with other bands at the time. The foursome played several concerts together and in 2004, they were joined by František Bořík.

=== Initial recordings and tours: 2005–2010 ===
In 2005, Mandrage self-released their debut album, Říkala, že jí trápí cosi. A year later, they signed a record deal with Universal. In 2007, the group released their first major-label record, Přišli jsme si pro vaše děti. They were also nominated in the category Discovery of the Year at the Anděl Awards and the Óčko Music Awards. Mandrage opened for Peha that year and for Wanastowi Vjecy in 2008. In 2009, the group released their next album, titled Hledá se žena, preceded by an eponymous single. That year, they won the Óčko Music Awards in the Rock category. In 2010, the single "Hledá se žena" held first place on various music charts in the Czech Republic, and the group embarked on their first major tour, named after the popular song. The track also won nominations at various award shows, including the Anděl Awards and Óčko.

=== Tenth anniversary and further activity: 2011–2019 ===
In 2011, Mandrage celebrated their tenth anniversary with the appropriately named "Tour 10 let Mandrage", which saw them performing across the Czech Republic, Slovakia, the UK, and Germany. The group followed this with the release of their fourth studio album, Moje krevní skupina and that year, they received the Band of the Year honour at the Anděl Awards. After several singles from the record gained radio airplay, the band once again won the Óčko award in the rock category.

Mandrage embarked on the "Moje krevní skupina" tour, and they took second place in the Song of the Year category and first place in the Group of the Year category at that year's Anděl Awards, as well as reaching fourth place in the Český slavík category Group of the Year. They were also nominated for the MTV Europe Music Award for Best Czech & Slovak Act.

In 2013, after playing numerous concerts and performing at various festivals, the band released their next album, titled Siluety, which received mostly positive reviews from music critics. They followed this again with an eponymous tour, which saw them playing in the Czech Republic and Slovakia.

In 2015, Mandrage released their subsequent studio album, the dance-oriented Potmě jsou všechny kočky černý. Two more records followed, with Po půlnoci in 2018 and Vidím to růžově a year later.

=== Breakup: 2020 ===
In December 2019, the group announced that after their planned 2020 "Dlouhej únor" tour, they would suspend activities for an indefinite period of time due to Starý's personal problems. Before the start of the tour, Starý suddenly stopped communicating with the band. Mandrage only completed the first concert, at Prague's Karlín Forum, with other musicians standing in for Starý, including Adam Mišík, Mirai Navrátil, Anna K, Debbi, Sebastian Navrátil, and Tereza Balonová. The tour was officially cancelled in January 2020.

== Band members ==
- Vít "Víťa" Starý – vocals, guitar
- Matyáš "Mates" Vorda – drums
- Josef "Pepa" Bolan – vocals, guitar
- Michal "Coopi" Faitl – bass
- František Bořík – keyboards

== Discography ==
Studio albums

- Říkala, že jí trápí cosi (2005)
- Přišli jsme si pro vaše děti (2007)
- Hledá se žena (2009)
- Moje krevní skupina (2011)
- Siluety (2013)
- Potmě jsou všechny kočky černý (2015)
- Po půlnoci (2018)
- Vidím to růžově (2019)

Compilations

- The Best Of (2007–2020) (2020)
- Top Hits (2026)
