= Verona (Czech group) =

Czech music group

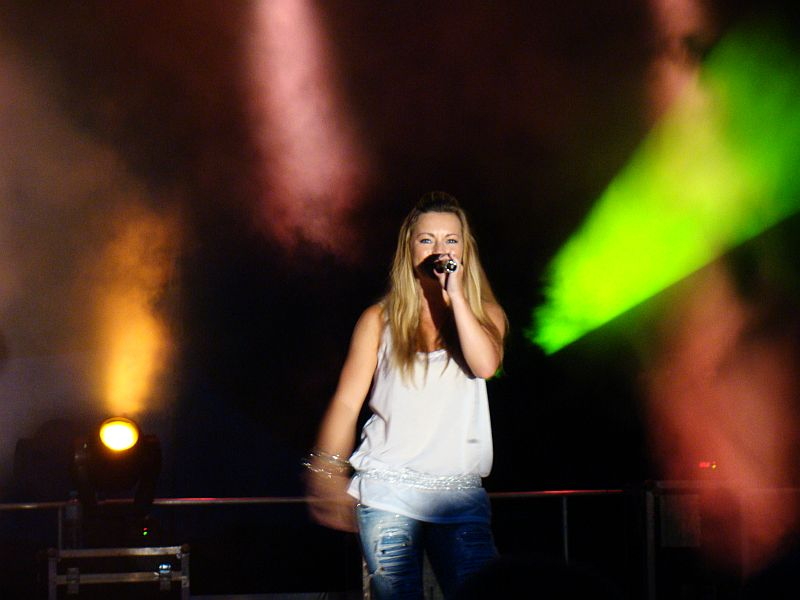

Background information
- Origin: Czech Republic
- Genres: House, trance, dance
- Years active: 2001–present
- Labels: Hitfactory, Epic
- Members: Peter Fider; Veronika Stýblová
- Past members: Markéta Jakšlová

Verona is Czech music group comprising composer and performer Petr Fider and singer Markéta Jakšlová. They began performing together in 2001. Their first album, Náhodou ("By Chance") was released in 2002. The second single from this album became a hit song in Czech Republic and Slovakia. They have recorded three albums as of 2012. Their music is in the pop and dance genres, with elements of House and Trance. In 2011, they produced an English-language song, "Hey Boy", that charted in several European countries.

== Members ==
- Petr Fider - songwriter, musician
- Veronika Stýblová - singer

Past members

- Markéta Jakšlová - singer

== Discography ==
=== Singles ===
Year	Single	Peak chart positions		Album
Year	Single	CZE	SVK	Album
2006	"Girotondo"	—	57	Girotondo
2006	"Naposled"	86	—	Girotondo
2007	"You Gotta Move On"	17	—	Best Of
2008	"Stay With Me"	34	—	Best Of
2009	"Do You Really Wanna Know"	24	12	Den otevřených dveří
2010	"Up to the Stars"	31	23	Den otevřených dveří
2010	"Ztracená Bloudím"	13	17	Den otevřených dveří
2011	"Hey Boy"	1	8	Den otevřených dveří
2011	"Bez Tebe"	3	19	Den otevřených dveří
2012	"Fallin' in Love"	2	5	Meziprostor
2015	"Teď a Tady"	55	-	Singles 2002–2016
2015	"Endless Day"	1	35	Singles 2002–2016

== Albums ==
- Náhodou
- Nejsi sám
- Jen Tobě
- Girotondo
- Videokolekce (DVD)
