= Albums – Top 100 (Czech Republic) =

Albums – Top 100 is a record chart ranking the 100 most popular music albums and EPs in the Czech Republic, published weekly by the IFPI Czech Republic. Published since 1996, it is based on sales (both at retail and digital), and online streaming on Spotify, Apple Music, Google Play and Deezer. Besides the main record chart with 100 ranks, the IFPI Czech Republic also publishes Albums Classical – Top 10 which features exclusively the 10 most popular albums of classical music. The chart covers approximately 91 per cent of whole music market in the Czech Republic.

As of the issue dated November 16, 2026 the current number-one album on the chart is Exit U Palice by Yzomandias.

== List of number-one albums ==
- List of number-one albums (Czech Republic)

== See also ==
- Rádio – Top 100 (Czech Republic)
- Rádio – Top 100 (Slovakia)
