= Mirai (band) =

Czech pop band

- Origin: Nový Jičín / Frýdek-Místek
- Genres: pop
- Years active: 2014–present
- Members: Mirai Navrátil; Šimon Bílý; Michal Stulík; Tomáš Javůrek
- Website: https://www.miraimusic.cz

Mirai is a Czech pop music group, founded in 2014 in Nový Jičín. The band consists of frontman, singer, and guitarist is Mirai Navrátil, drummer Šimon Bílý, bass guitarist Michal Stulík, and guitarist Tomáš Javůrek. The band had won both Český slavík and Anděl awards.

== History ==
=== Beginnings ===
Mirai Navrátil, born in Japan and raised in Frýdek-Místek, met Šimon Bílý while playing for the local English band Dolls In The Factory. In 2014, Navrátil and Bílý founded Mirai, recruiting Michal Stulík as its third member. This trio signed a contract with Universal Music record label and decided to sing in Czech. Navrátil's name serves as the group's namesake, and means "future" in Japanese.

=== Early achievements ===
At the beginning of 2015, Mirai released their first song Dítě robotí ("Robot's Child"), which contained pop and electronic themes. It became one of the three most played songs on Czech radio stations. That same year, they released a second single Souznění. Their third single Cesta z města ("The Way off the City") was published in October 2015 and presented in the band Kryštof's concert performances, quickly becoming their breakthrough hit. In January 2016, Cesta z města became the second most played song on Czech radio stations. Their single Kokos bez kokosu also entered the top five in 2016.

=== Konnichiwa album ===
In February 2017, Mirai released a single entitled Když nemůžeš, přidej ("If you are exhausted, just speed up"). The music video for the single depicts group members fulfilling impossible tasks, according to Emil Zátopek's motto. The single became the most played on Czech radio for nine weeks, and remained in the top 10 until the spring of 2018.

Tomáš Javůrek, joined Mirai as a second guitarist before the release of the album Konnichiwa in October 2017. The album was made with four producers, and featured various musical styles. At the time of its release, the wife of Šimon Bílý died in a car accident, so the planned joint tour with Poetika was postponed from autumn 2017 to spring 2018.

In April 2018, Mirai received a platinum album at the concert at Lucerna Music Bar. The album also featured the singles Pojď, zapomenem ("Come on, we'll forget it") and Anděl ("Angel") (twice at the top of Top CZ/SK chart). The band started to appear at many large summer music festivals.

At 2017 Český slavík awards, Mirai were chosen as the Discovery of the year and song Když nemůžeš, tak přidej became the most popular and most streamed song of the year. Mirai became a discovery of the year also at the 2017 Anděl Awards.

=== Second album ===
In January 2019, the band introduced a first song of their second album, whose release was announced to October 2019. In March and April 2019, Mirai won TOP 50 CZ/SK chart six times in a row.

In March 2023, the band announced a work on a new album.

== Discography ==
- Cesta z města (2015)
- Konnichiwa (2017)
- Arigatō (2019)
- Maneki Neko (2021)
- Tomodachi (2024)
