= Tomáš Klus =

Czech musician (born 1986)

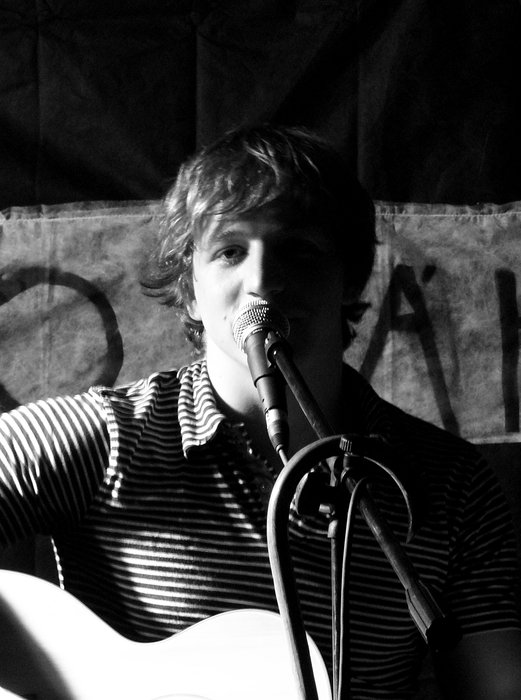
- Album release, Prague (2008)

Background information
- Born: 15 May 1986 (age 40); Třinec, Czech Republic
- Genres: Folk, rock, pop
- Occupation: Singer-songwriter
- Instrument: Guitar
- Label: Sony BMG
- Website: Official website

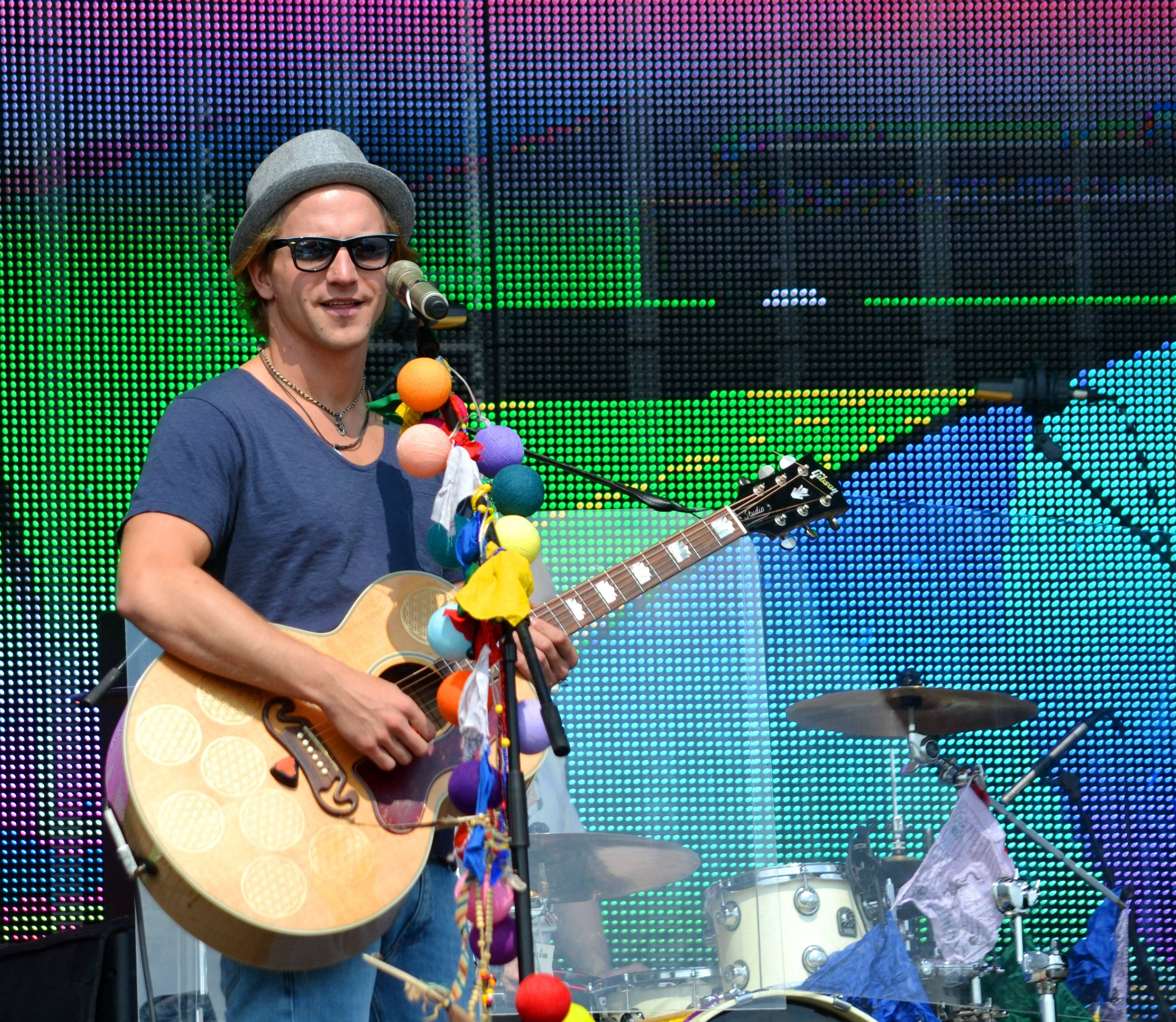
Tomáš Klus (2014)

Tomáš Klus (born 15 May 1986) is a Czech musician and songwriter from the Moravian-Silesian Region of the Czech Republic.

== Life and career ==
Klus was born in the industrial town of Třinec, where he spent most of his childhood. His parents were folk music fans, and he accompanied them to many concerts and music festivals. Growing up he was heavily influenced by musicians Karel Plíhal, Karel Kryl and in particular Jaromír Nohavica, who is still a major influence on Klus' music.

Klus moved to Prague aged 15 to pursue a sporting career, and was a member of the gold medal winning team in modern pentathlon in the 2002 European championship. However, he later became more interested in performance art and music.

In 2007, he was the winner of the Czech Talent Zlín competition. In 2008 he released his debut album, Cesta do záhu(d)by. The single "Do Nebe" was played on Czech Radio before the album was released. He also wrote music for the Czech film Anglické jahody ("English Strawberries").

In 2011, he released a song called "Pánu bohu do oken" ("Into God's windows") a song critical of Czech politics and the behaviour of Czech politicians. It was performed live at Český slavík 2011, a mainstream Czech music awards ceremony. On 26 September 2011, his album Racek was released. It debuted at number one in Czech Album Sales Chart and it was certified Gold in its first week on sale. Racek spent 23 non-consecutive weeks at number one. It was the best selling album of 2011 in the Czech Republic, and later certified diamond.

In September 2012, he graduated in drama from the Faculty of the Academy of Performing Arts (DAMU) in Prague.

Tomáš Klus' latest album, entitled Proměnamě, was released on 24 March 2014. It debuted at number one in Czech Album Sales Chart.

== Political views ==
In March 2024, Klus posted a video on social media discussing the Israeli invasion of the Gaza Strip, in which he expressed solidarity with people in Gaza, criticised the Czech government's stance on the conflict, and compared the continuing expansion of Israel to previous occupations of Czechoslovakia. "I would like to ask if, as a state that has a very bad experience with occupation, we should not be a little more sensitive to this issue and if we should ask our government how it is that it so vehemently and unconditionally stands behind a state that occupies another state," he said. Czech journalists including Ludek Fiala from Novinky.cz accused Klus of factually inaccuracies in his post and criticised him for failing to condemn the Hamas attack on Israel on 7 October 2023.

== Discography ==
- Cesta do záhu(d)by (2008, Sony BMG)
- Hlávní uzávěr splínu (2009)
- Racek (2011)
- Proměnamě (2014)
- Anat život není (2015)
- Spolu (2018)
- Klusymfonie (with Janáček Philharmonic Orchestra) (2019)
- ČAUČESKU (2021)
- Cítím (2021)
- Tady to máš (2024)

== Awards and certifications ==
=== Awards ===
- 2008 – Anděl – The best new act
- 2009 – Anděl – Singer of the year
- 2010 – TV Óčko Music Awards – Singer of the year
- 2011 – OSA Award – The most successful young artist
- 2011 – Český slavík Awards – Silver award (2nd place) in category of Male singers
- 2011 – Anděl – Singer of the year
- 2011 – Anděl – Album of the year award for "Racek"
- 2011 – Anděl – The best selling album of the year award for "Racek"
- 2011 – Žebřík Awards – Album of the year award for "Racek"
- 2011 – Žebřík Awards – Male singer of the year – 2nd place
- 2011 – Žebřík Awards – Song of the year award for "Nina"
- 2011 – TýTý Awards – Male singer of the year – 2nd place
- 2011 – TýTý Awards – The best new artist
- 2012 – Český Slavík Awards – Winner in category of Male

=== Certifications ===
- 2009 – Gold album for selling more than 6,000 copies of "Cesta do záhu(d)by"
- 2010 – Gold album for selling more than 8,000 copies of "Hlavní úzavěr splínu"
- 2011 – Platinum album for selling more than 12,000 copies of "Hlavní uzávěr splínu"
- 2011 – Gold album for selling more than 6,000 copies of "Racek"
- 2011 – Platinum album for selling more than 12,000 copies of "Racek"
- 2011 – Double platinum album for selling more than 24,000 copies of "Racek"
- 2012 – Diamond album for selling more than 50,000 copies of "Racek"
