= Kryštof (band) =

Czech pop rock band

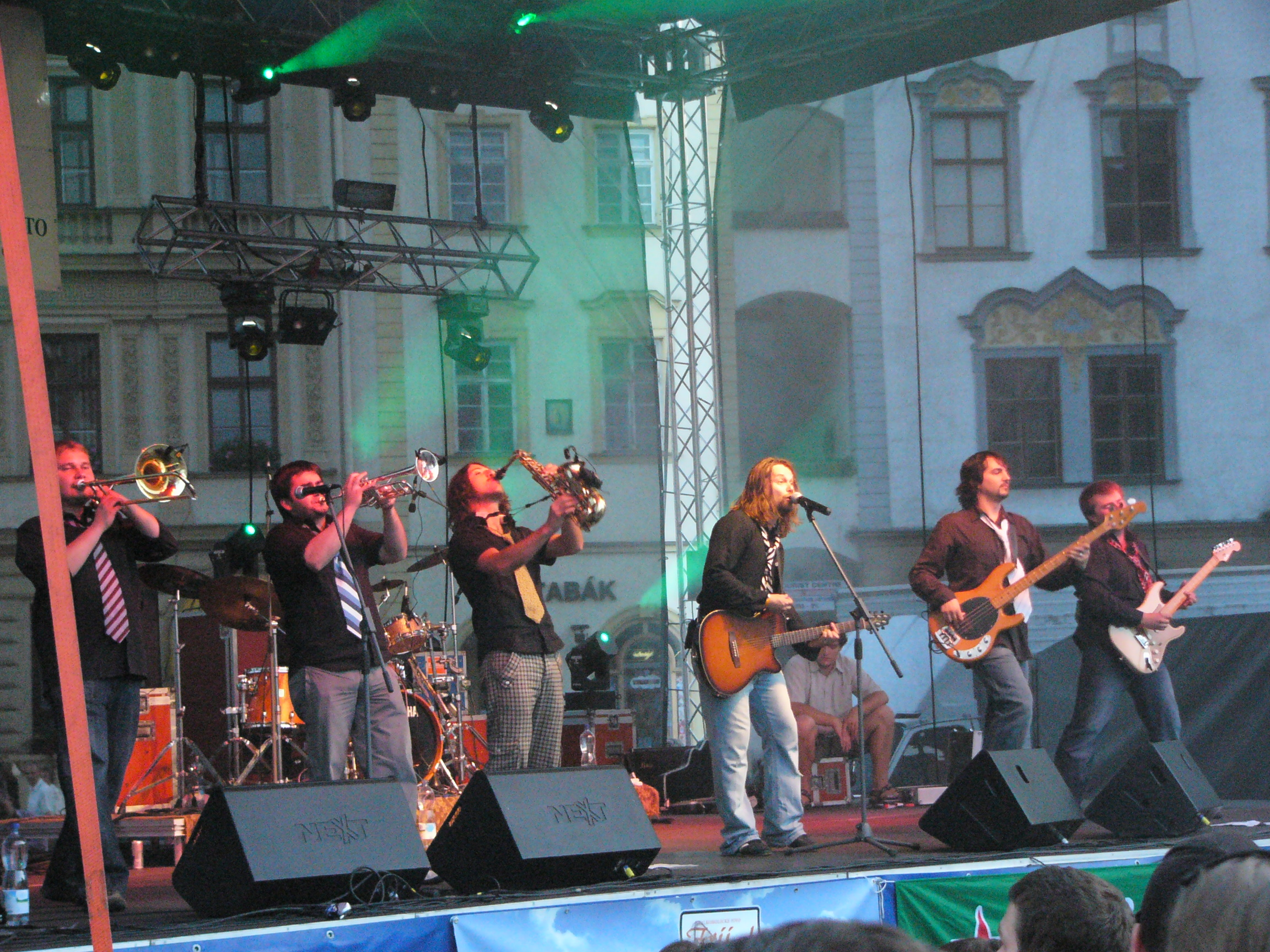
- Kryštof performing in 2007

Background information
- Origin: Havířov, Czech Republic
- Genres: Pop, alternative rock
- Years active: 1994–present
- Label: EMI
- Members: Richard Krajčo; Nikos Petros Kuluris; Nikolaj Atanasov Arichtev; Jakub Dominik; Evžen Hofmann; Ondřej Kyjonka; Nikolas Grigoriadis
- Past members: Pavel Studník; Biser Arichtev; Jaroslav Blahut; Marc Minarich; Aleš Konieczny
- Website: krystof.net

Kryštof is a Czech pop rock band founded in 1994 in Havířov by Richard Krajčo, Nikolaj Arichtev, Jaroslav Blahut, Biser Arichtev, and Pavel Studník. As of 2023, they have released nine studio albums, one EP, three live albums, one remix album, and two compilations.

In 2006, Kryštof won their first Anděl Award and have since received twelve more. In 2013, they won a Český slavík award for Group of the Year.

== Band members ==
Current

- Richard Krajčo – vocals, guitar
- Nikos Petros Kuluris – saxophone, clarinet
- Nikolaj Atanasov Arichtev – bass guitar
- Jakub Dominik – drums
- Evžen Hofmann – guitar
- Ondřej Kyjonka – trombone, keyboards
- Nikolas Grigoriadis – trumpet

Past

- Pavel Studník – guitar
- Biser Arichtev – guitar
- Jaroslav Blahut – drums
- Marc Minarich – keyboards
- Aleš Konieczny – saxophone

== Discography ==
Studio albums

- Magnetické pole (2001)
- V siločarách (2002)
- 03 (2003)
- Mikrokosmos (2004)
- Rubikon (2006)
- Jeviště (2010)
- Inzerát (2012)
- Srdcebeat (2015)
- Halywůd (2021)
- Půlnočhí Hřích (2026)

EPs

- Srdcebeat Remix (2015)

Live albums

- Ži(v)je (2005)
- Kryštof v Opeře (2008)
- Kryštof na Strahově 2017 (2018)

Remix albums

- Rem-X-Y (2012)

Compilations

- Poločas (2007)
- 25 (2017)

DVDs

- Ži(v)je (2005)
- Kryštof/on Kinotour 2011 (2012)
- Kryštof na Strahově 2017 (2018)

Singles

- "Lolita" (2001)
- "Obchodník s deštěm" (2002)
- "Rubikon" (2006)
- "Plán" (2007)
- "Atentát" (2008)
- "Tak nějak málo tančím" (2008)
- "cyRáno" (2009)
- "Jeviště" (2010)
- "Ostravská Balada" (2010)
- "Inzerát" (2012)
- "Křídla z mýdla" (2012)
- "Čím víc vím" (2013)
- "Zatančím" (2013)
- "Cesta" (2013)
- "Srdcebeat" (2015)
- "Ty a já" (2015)
- "Invaze" (2015)
- "Každé ráno" (2015)
- "Tak pojď hledat břeh" (2016)
- "Šňůry" (2017)
- "Zůstaň tu se mnou" (2017)
- "Naviděnou" (2018)
- "Nesmím zapomenout" (2019)
- "Hvězdáři" (2019)
- "Hned teď" (2020)
- "Milan Baroš" (2020)
- "Vánoční" (2020)
- "Halywůd" (2021)
- "Do nebe se propadám" (2021)
- "Co bude pak" (2022)
- "Půlnočhí Hřích" (2026)
- "Moviestars" (2026)
