= EPMD discography =

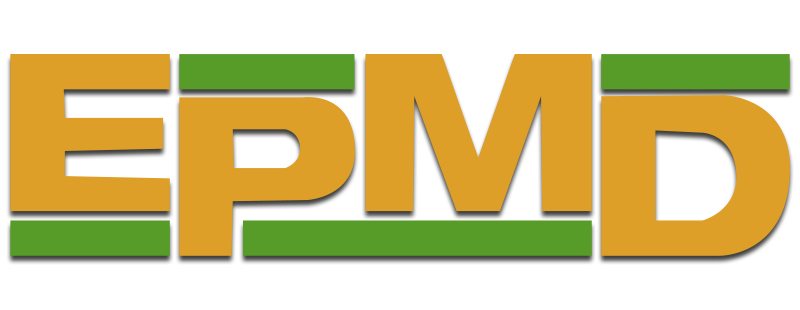
- Studio albums: 7
- Singles: 12

This is the discography of American rap duo EPMD.

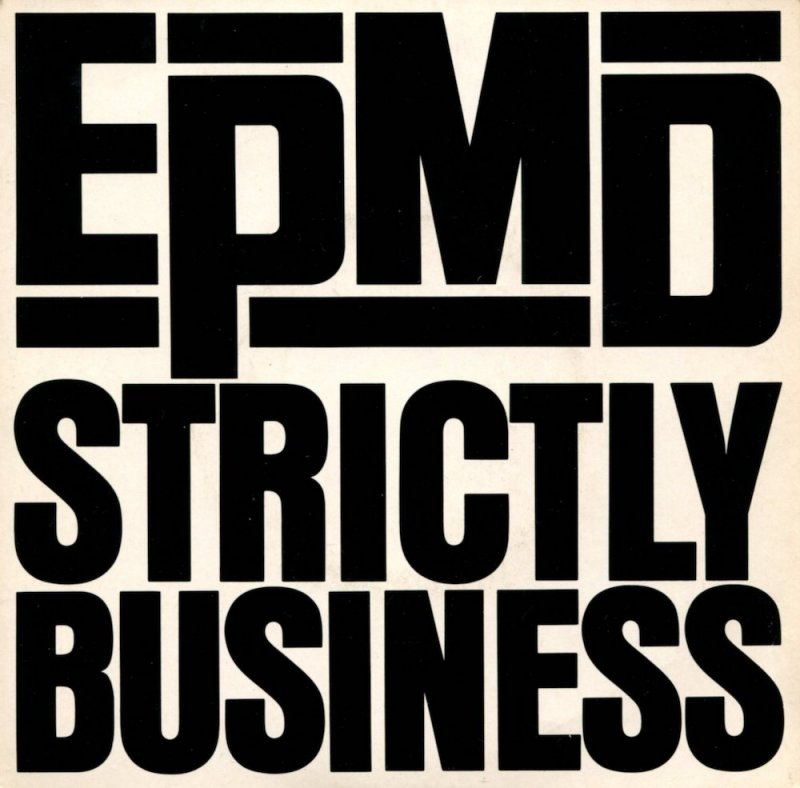
U.K. version of the "Strictly Business" single, released on Cooltempo Records

== Studio albums ==
List of studio albums, with selected chart positions, sales figures and certifications
Title	Album details	Peak chart positions					Sales	Certifications
Title	Album details	US	US R&B /HH	US Rap	UK	UK R&B	Sales	Certifications
Strictly Business	Released: June 7, 1988; Label: Fresh/Sleeping Bag; Formats: CD, LP, cassette, digital download	80	1	—	—	—		RIAA: Gold
Unfinished Business	Released: August 1, 1989; Label: Fresh/Sleeping Bag; Format: CD, LP, cassette, digital download	53	1	—	—	—		RIAA: Gold
Business as Usual	Released: January 11, 1991; Label: Def Jam; Format: CD, LP, cassette, digital download	36	1	—	69	—		RIAA: Gold
Business Never Personal	Released: July 28, 1992; Label: Def Jam; Format: CD, LP, cassette, digital download	14	5	—	—	—		RIAA: Gold
Back in Business	Released: September 23, 1997; Label: Def Jam; Format: CD, LP, cassette, digital download	16	4	—	100	14		RIAA: Gold
Out of Business	Released: July 20, 1999; Label: Def Jam; Format: CD, LP, Cassette, digital download	13	2	—	—	18	US: 247,000	
We Mean Business	Released: December 9, 2008; Label: EP Records; Format: CD, digital download	—	42	13	—	—		
"—" denotes a recording that did not chart or was not released in that territory. "*" indicates a chart that did not exist at the time.

=== Live albums ===
List of live albums
Title	Album details
Live Business	Released: January 19, 2019; Label: Def Squad; Format: Digital download

== EPs ==
List of extended plays
Title	Details	Track listings
Danger Zone! (Note: Released as a Split EP with PMD solo "The Truth".)	Released: September 21, 2004; Label: Nervous, Boondox, Hit Squad; Formats: CD, LP, digital download	Track listing: 1. "Danger Zone (Vocal Version)"; 2. "Danger Zone (Clean Version)"; 3. "Danger Zone (Instrumental)"; 4. "The Truth (Vocal Version)"; 5. "The Truth (Clean Version)"; 6. "The Truth (Instrumental)"
Serious (with Redman & Das EFX) (Note: Released as a Split EP with PMD solo "U Can't".)	Released: November 23, 2004; Label: Nervous; Formats: LP, digital download	Track listing: 1. "Serious (Clean)" (with Redman & Das EFX); 2. "Serious (Dirty)" (with Redman & Das EFX); 3. "Serious (Instrumental)" (with Redman & Das EFX); 4. "U Can't (Clean)"; 5. "U Can't (Instrumental)"; 6. "Serious (Acapella)" (with Redman & Das EFX)
For the People (Sonny Fodera Remix) (with Robosonic)	Released: February 14, 2020; Label: Armada Subjekt; Formats: digital download	Track listing: 1. "For The People (Sonny Fodera Remix)"; 2. "For The People (Sonny Fodera Extended Remix)"; 3. "For The People"; 4. "For The People (Extended Mix)"

== Singles ==
=== As lead artist ===
List of singles, with selected chart positions and certifications, showing year released and album name
Title	Year	Peak chart positions								Certifications	Album
Title	Year	US	US Dance	US R&B	US Rap	GER	NZ	UK	UK Dance	Certifications	Album
"It's My Thing" (Note: Published as "EPEE MD".)	1987	—	—	—	*	—	—	97	—		Strictly Business
"You Gots to Chill"	1988	—	— (Note: "You Gots to Chill" did not enter the Dance Club Songs, but peaked at number 15 on the Dance/Electronic Singles Sales.)	22	*	—	—	—	—		Strictly Business
"Strictly Business"	1988	—	19	25	*	—	—	90	—		Strictly Business
"I'm Housin/Get off the Bandwagon"	1988	—	—	—	28	—	—	89	—		Strictly Business
"So Wat Cha Sayin'"	1989	—	— (Note: "So Wat Cha Sayin'" did not enter the Dance Club Songs, but peaked at number 40 on the Dance/Electronic Singles Sales.)	23	5	—	—	—	—		Unfinished Business
"The Big Payback"	1989	—	—	—	—	—	—	—	—		Unfinished Business
"You Had Too Much to Drink"	1989	—	—	—	—	—	—	—	—		Unfinished Business
"Gold Digger"	1990	—	— (Note: "Gold Digger" did not enter the Dance Club Songs, but peaked at number 24 on the Dance/Electronic Singles Sales.)	14	1	—	—	—	—		Business as Usual
"Rampage" (featuring LL Cool J)	1991	—	—	30	2	—	—	—	—		Business as Usual
"Give the People"	1991	—	—	—	28	—	—	—	—		Business as Usual
"Crossover"	1992	42	41	14	1	—	—	—	—	RIAA: Gold	Business Never Personal
"Head Banger" (featuring K-Solo and Redman)	1992	—	—	75	11	—	—	—	—		Business Never Personal
"Never Seen Before" (Note: "Never Seen Before" was released as a split single with "Big Bad Mamma" by Foxy Brown feat. Dru Hill.)	1997	—	—	—	—	—	—	—	—		How to Be a Player Soundtrack / Back in Business
"Da Joint"	1997	94	— (Note: "Da Joint" did not enter the Dance Club Songs, but peaked at number 5 on the Dance/Electronic Singles Sales.)	45	17	—	—	—	—		Back in Business
"Richter Scale"	1997	— (Note: "Richter Scale" did not enter the Billboard Hot 100, but peaked at number 18 on the Bubbling Under Hot 100.)	— (Note: "Richter Scale" did not enter the Dance Club Songs, but peaked at number 27 on the Dance/Electronic Singles Sales.)	62	—	—	—	—	—		Back in Business
"Strictly Business" (Mantronik MBA Radio Edit) (with Kurtis Mantronik)	1998	—	— (Note: "Strictly Business" (Mantronik MBA Radio Edit)" did not enter the Dance Club Songs, but peaked at number 45 on the Dance/Electronic Singles Sales.)	—	—	85	31	43	17		Blade (Soundtrack)
"Right Now"	1999	—	—	—	—	—	—	—	—		Out of Business
"Symphony 2000" (featuring Redman, Method Man and Lady Luck)	1999	—	—	62	28	—	—	—	—		Out of Business
"Pioneers"	1999	—	—	—	—	—	—	—	—		Out of Business
"Look At U Now"	2002	—	—	—	—	—	—	—	—		Non-album singles
"Danger Zone!" (Note: Released as a Split EP with PMD solo "The Truth".)	2004	—	—	—	—	—	—	—	—		Non-album singles
"Serious" (with Redman & Das EFX) (Note: Released as a Split EP with PMD solo "U Can't".)	2004	—	—	—	—	—	—	—	—		Zero Tolerance
"Blow!"	2007	—	—	—	—	—	—	—	—		We Mean Business
"Listen Up" (featuring Teddy Riley)	2008	—	—	—	—	—	—	—	—		We Mean Business
"For the People" (with Robosonic)	2019	—	—	—	—	—	—	—	—		Armada Subjekt Miami Sessions (Mixed by Robosonic)
"Brothers From Brentwood Long Island"	2019	—	—	—	—	—	—	—	—		Business Never Personal (deluxe edition)
"The Main Event Remix"	2020	—	—	—	—	—	—	—	—		Non-album single
"Top Gun" (with Agallah)	2020	—	—	—	—	—	—	—	—		High Level Art
"The Big Payback" (re-release)	2021	—	—	—	—	—	—	— (Note: "The Big Payback" did not enter the UK Singles Chart, but peaked at number 76 on the UK Physical Singles Chart.)	—		Unfinished Business
"—" denotes a recording that did not chart or was not released in that territory. "*" indicates a chart that did not exist at the time.

=== As featured artist ===
List of singles, with selected chart positions
Title	Year	Peak chart positions	Album
Title	Year	US Dance	Album
"Can I Get It, Yo" (Run-DMC featuring EPMD)	1993	— (Note: "Can I Get It, Yo" did not enter the Dance Club Songs, but peaked at number 40 on the Dance/Electronic Singles Sales.)	Down with the King
"Never Defeat 'Em" (DJ Honda featuring EPMD)	2009	—	IV / We Mean Business

== Other appearances ==
- 1991: "It's Going Down" (Juice [soundtrack], EPMD)
- 1993: "Can I Get It, Yo" (Down with the King, Run-DMC)
- 1998: "It's My Thang '99" (The Professional, DJ Clue, Keith Murray & Redman)
- 1998: Generation EFX" (Generation EFX, Das Efx)
- 2003: "Look at You Now" (The Awakening, PMD)
- 2009: "Never Defeat 'Em" (Honda IV, DJ Honda)
- 2017: "The Real Is Gone" (Busine$$ Mentality, PMD)
- 2021: "EPMD 2" (King's Disease 2, Nas & Eminem)
