= Erick Sermon production discography =

The following is a discography of production credited to Erick Sermon.

== 1988 ==
=== EPMD - Strictly Business ===
(All tracks co-produced with PMD.)

- 01. "Strictly Business"
- 02. "I'm Housin"
- 03. "Let the Funk Flow"
- 04. "You Gots to Chill"
- 05. "It's My Thing"
- 06. "You're a Customer"
- 07. "The Steve Martin"
- 08. "Get off the Bandwagon"
- 09. "D.J. K La Boss"
- 10. "Jane"

== 1989 ==
=== EPMD - Unfinished Business ===
(All tracks co-produced with PMD.)

- 01. ”So Wat Cha Sayin'"
- 02. ”Total Kaos"
- 03. ”Get The Bozack"
- 04. ”Jane II"
- 05. ”Please Listen to My Demo'"
- 06. ”It’s Time to Party"
- 07. ”Who’s Booty"
- 08. ”The Big Payback"
- 09. ”Strictly Snappin' Necks"
- 10. ”Knick Knack Patty Wack" (feat. K-Solo)
- 11. ”You Had Too Much to Drink" (feat. Frank B.)
- 12. ”It Wasn't Me, It Was the Fame"

== 1990 ==
=== K-Solo – Tell the World My Name ===
- 01. "Spellbound"

=== EPMD - Business as Usual ===
(All tracks co-produced with PMD.)

- 01. "I'm Mad"
- 02. "Hardcore" (feat. Redman)
- 03. "Rampage" (feat. LL Cool J)
- 04. "Manslaughter"
- 05. "Jane 3"
- 06. "For My People"
- 07. "Mr. Bozack"
- 08. "Gold Digger"
- 09. "Give the People"
- 10. "Rap Is Outta Control"
- 11. "Brothers on My Jock" (feat. Redman)
- 12. "Underground"
- 13. "Hit Squad Heist"

== 1991 ==
=== Saxxy – "Keep Yo But at Home" ===
- B2. "Keepyo But at Home (Club)" [feat. Redman & Erick Sermon]

=== Roger Troutman - "(Everybody) Get Up" ===
- A2. "(Everybody) Get Up (EPMD Diesel Remix)" [feat. EPMD]

== 1992 ==
=== K-Solo – Time’s Up ===
- 06. "The Baby Doesn't Look Like Me"
- 10. "Rock Bottom"

=== EPMD – Business Never Personal ===
(All tracks co-produced with PMD and Mr. Bozack, except track 3 co-produced with PMD and Charlie Marotta)

- 01. "Boon Dox"
- 02. "Nobody's Safe Chump"
- 03. "Can't Hear Nothing but the Music"
- 04. "Chill"
- 05. "Head Banger" (feat. K-Solo and Redman)
- 07. "Crossover"
- 08. "Cummin' at Cha" (feat. Das EFX)
- 09. "Play the Next Man"
- 10. "It's Going Down"
- 11. "Who Killed Jane?"

=== Redman - Whut? Thee Album ===
(All tracks co-produced by Redman)

- 02. "Time 4 Sum Aksion"
- 03. "Da Funk"
- 05. "So Ruff"
- 06. "Rated 'R'"
- 07. "Watch Yo' Nuggets" (feat. Erick Sermon)
- 09. "Jam 4 U"
- 10. "Blow Your Mind"
- 14. "Tonight's da Night"
- 16. "I'm a Bad"
- 20. "A Day of Sooperman Lover"
- 00. "Time 4 Sum Aksion (Green-Eyed Remix)"
- 00. "Tonight's da Night (Remix)"

== 1993 ==
=== Boss - Born Gangstaz ===
- 03. "Comin' to Getcha"
- 15. "2 to da Head"

=== Illegal - The Untold Truth ===
- 03. "Head or Gut"
- 05. "We Getz Buzy" (feat. Erick Sermon)

=== Run–D.M.C. - Down with the King ===
- 03. "Can I Get It, Yo" {co-produced by PMD}

=== Erick Sermon – No Pressure ===
- 01. "Intro"
- 02. "Payback II" (feat. Joe Sinistr)
- 03. "Stay Real"
- 04. "Imma Gitz Mine"
- 05. "Hostile" (feat. Keith Murray)
- 06. "Do It Up"
- 07. "Safe Sex"
- 08. "Hittin' Switches" {found too on Who's the Man? (soundtrack)}
- 09. "Intro"
- 10. "Erick Sermon"
- 11. "The Hype"
- 12. "Lil Crazy" (feat. Shadz of Lingo)
- 13. "The Ill Shit" (feat. Kam and Ice Cube)
- 14. "Swing It Over Here" (feat. Def Squad)
- 15. "Interview"
- 16. "All in the Mind" (feat. Soup) {co-produced by Collin Wolfe}
- 17. "Female Species" {co-produced by Brent Turner}
- 00. "Stay Real (Remix)"
- 00. "Safe Sex" (Remix)

=== Shaquille O'Neal - Shaq Diesel ===
- 03. "I'm Outstanding"
- 06. "Let Me In, Let Me In"
- 07. "Shoot Pass Slam"
- 08. "Boom!" (feat. Fu-Schnickens & Erick Sermon)
- 00. "I'm Outstanding (Remix)"

=== Kronic – "It Bee'z Like That" 12" ===
- A1. "It Bee'z Like That"

=== Knucklehedz – Stricktly Savage ===
- 07. "All She Wanted"
- 10. "Who Called da Cops"
- 12. "Merlin"

=== Dougie Dee - "Do You Wanna Ride?" ===
- A1. "Do You Wanna Ride (Remix)"

=== En Vogue - "Runaway Love" ===
- A3. "Runaway Love" (Remix) [feat. Erick Sermon]

== 1994 ==
=== Shadz of Lingo - A View to a Kill ===
- 02. "Mad Flavaz" (feat. Erick Sermon)

=== Quo - Quo ===
- 04. "JusAnuff"

=== Jodeci – "Feenin'" ===
- A2. "Feenin' (E Double Gets Bizzy Mix)"
- A3. "Feenin' (E Double Gets Bizz-e-r Mix)" [feat. Erick Sermon]

=== Heavy D – Nuttin' But Love/ Let's Get It On: The Album ===
- 08. "Take Your Time"

=== Blackstreet - Blackstreet ===
- 09. "Booti Call" {co-produced by Teddy Riley and Markell Riley}

=== Shaquille O'Neal – Shaq Fu: Da Return ===
- 05. "Shaq's Got It Made" {co-produced by Redman}
- 07. "My Style, My Stelo" (feat. Redman & Erick Sermon)
- 09. "Nobody"

=== Keith Murray – The Most Beautifullest Thing in This World ===
- 01. "Live from New York"
- 02. "Sychosymatic"
- 03. "Dip Dip Di" (co-produced by KP)
- 04. "The Most Beautifullest Thing in This World"
- 05. "Herb Is Pumpin'"
- 06. "Sychoward"
- 07. "Straight Loonie" (feat. Erick Sermon and Jamal) {co-produced by KP and Busta Rhymes}
- 08. "Danger"
- 09. "Get Lifted"
- 10. "How’s That" (feat. Erick Sermon and Redman) {found too on A Low Down Dirty Shame (soundtrack)}
- 11. "The Chase"
- 12. "Take It to the Streets"
- 13. "Bom Bom Zee" (feat. Hurricane G)
- 14. "Countdown"
- 16. "The Most Beautifullest Thing in This World [Green-Eyed Remix]"
- 00. "Get Lifted (Remix)"
- 00. "Dip DIp DI (You Remix Me)"

=== Redman – Dare Iz a Darkside ===
(All tracks co-produced by Redman)

- 03. "Journey Throo da Darkside"
- 05. "A Million and 1 Buddah Spots"
- 07. "Cosmic Slop" (feat. Erick Sermon & Keith Murray)
- 13. "Can't Wait"
- 14. "Winicumuhround"
- 00. "Rockafella (Remix)"

=== Ed Lover & Doctor Dré - Back Up Off Me! ===
- 02. "It's Going Down" (feat. Keith Murray & Erick Sermon)

=== Crustified Dibbs – Night of the Bloody Apes (unreleased) ===
- 02. "You Ain't Never Been Down"

== 1995 ==
=== Boyz II Men - "Vibin'" ===
- B2. "Vibin' (Def Squad Remix)"

=== Various Artists – The Show (soundtrack) ===
- A1. "How High" - Method Man & Redman

=== Super Cat - The Struggle Continues ===
- 02. "Girlstown (Sermon Hop)"

=== Jamal – Last Chance, No Breaks ===
- 03. ”Situation" {co-produced by Rockwilder}
- 09. ”Keep It Real"

=== AZ – "Gimme Yours" ===
- A1. "Gimme Yours (Green-Eyed Remix)"

=== LL Cool J - "Hey Lover" ===
- "Hey Lover (Green Eyed Remix)"

=== Erick Sermon – Double or Nothing ===
- 01. "Intro (Skit)"
- 02. "Bomdigi" {co-produced by Sugarless}
- 03. "Freak Out" (co-produced by Rod 'KP' Kirkpatrick) [feat. Redman]
- 04. "In the Heat" {co-produced by Sugarless}
- 05. "Tell 'Em" (co-produced by Rod 'KP' Kirkpatrick) [feat. Roz & Keith Murray]
- 06. "In the Studio (Skit)"
- 07. "Boy Meets World" {co-produced by Rockwilder}
- 08. "Welcome" {co-produced by Rockwilder} [feat. Keith Murray]
- 09. "Live in the Backyard (Skit)"
- 10. "Set It Off" (feat. Keith Murray)
- 11. "Focus"
- 12. "Move On" {co-produced by Sugarless} [feat. Redman & Passion]
- 13. "Smooth Thought (Skit)"
- 14. "Do Your Thing" {co-produced by Redman}
- 16. "The Message (Skit)"
- 17. "Open Fire" (feat. Def Squad)
- 00. "Bomdigi (Remix)"

=== Questionmark Asylum – "Hey Lookaway" ===
- A2. "Lookaway (Erick Sermon Remix)"

=== Various artists - New Jersey Drive, Vol. 1 ===
- 13. "East Left" - Keith Murray

=== Kapone – "Get Down to It / No Jurisdiction" ===
- A1. "Get Down to It" (feat. Keith Murray)
- B1. "No Jurisdiction"

=== Powerule – "Dawn to Dusk" ===
- B1. "Rock Ya Knot Quick"

== 1996 ==
=== D'Angelo – "Me and Those Dreaming Eyes of Mine" ===
- A1. "Me and Those Dreamin' Eyes of Mine (Def Squad Remix)" [feat. Redman]
- A2. "Me and Those Dreamin' Eyes of Mine (Dreamy Remix)"

=== Bahamadia - "I Confess" ===
- A1. "I Confess (Erick Sermon Remix)"

=== Various artists – Insomnia: The Erick Sermon Compilation Album ===
- 02. "Funkorama" - Redman {co-produced by Redman}
- 04. "As The..." - Passion
- 05. "Beez Like That (Sometimes)" - Jamal & Calif {co-produced by Rockwilder}
- 06. "It's That Hit" - Keith Murray
- 07. "Up Jump the Boogie" - The Wixton's {co-produced by Sugarless}
- 09. "I Feel It" - L.O.D.
- 10. "On the Regular" - DUO
- 11. "Fear" - Tommy Gunn
- 12. "Ready for War" - Domo
- 13. "Reign" - Erick Sermon
- 00. "Funkorama (Remix)" - Redman
- 000. "Funkorama (Remix #2)" - Redman & Erick Sermon
- 00. "I Feel It (Remix)" - L.O.D.

=== Jodeci - "Get on Up" ===
- "Get on Up (Def Squad Remix)" [feat. Erick Sermon]

=== SWV - New Beginning ===
- 04. "On & On" (feat. Erick Sermon)

=== Alfonzo Hunter - Blacka da Berry ===
- 01. "Weekend Thang"
- 02. "Blacka da Berry" (co-produced by Sugarless)
- 03. "When You're Ready"
- 04. "Keep it Tight (Interlude)"
- 06. "Crazy" (co-produced by Hen-Gee)
- 07. "Just the Way (Playas Play)" [feat. Erick Sermon]
- 08. "Groove On" (co-produced by Jazzy Faye)
- 11. "Daddy's Little Baby"
- 13. "Quiet Time"
- 00. "Just the Way (Player's Remix)" [feat. Erick Sermon]

=== George Clinton - T.A.P.O.A.F.O.M. ===
- 01. "If Anybody Gets Funked Up (It's Gonna Be You)" [feat. Erick Sermon and MC Breed]

=== Keith Murray – Enigma ===
- 01. "Intro"
- 02. "Call My Name"
- 03. "Manifique (Original Rules)"
- 04. "Whut's Happinin'"
- 05. "The Rhyme"
- 07. "Rhymin' Wit Kel" (feat. Kel-Vicious) {co-produced by Sugarless}
- 08. "What a Feeling" {co-produced by Sugarless}
- 09. "Hot to Def" {co-produced by Sugarless}
- 10. "Yeah" (feat. Busta Rhymes, Jamal and Def Squad) {co-produced by Sugarless}
- 11. "Love L.O.D." (feat. 50 Grand and Kel-Vicious) {co-produced by Rod 'KP' Kirkpatrick}
- 12. "To My Mans" (feat. Dave Hollister)
- 13. "World Be Free"

=== Bounty Killer - My Xperience ===
- 06. "Change Like the Weather" (feat. Busta Rhymes & Junior Reid)

=== Redman – Muddy Waters ===
- 02. "Iz He 4 Real" {co-produced by Redman}
- 03. "Rock da Spot" {co-produced by Ty Fyffe}
- 04. "Welcome" (Interlude)
- 06. "Pick It Up"
- 09. "Whateva Man" (featuring Erick Sermon)
- 11. "On Fire"
- 16. "Da Bump"
- 18. "Yesh Yesh Y'all"
- 21. "Soopaman Luva 3" {co-produced by Redman}
- 22. "Rollin'"
- 23. "Da Ill Out" (featuring Keith Murray and Jamal)

=== MC Breed – To Da Beat Ch'all ===
- 09. "To da Beat Ch'all" (feat. Erick Sermon)

=== Various artists – Don't Be a Menace to South Central While Drinking Your Juice in the Hood (soundtrack) ===
- 07. "Maintain" - Erick Sermon

=== Various artists – The Nutty Professor (soundtrack) ===
- 10. "Breaker 1, Breaker 2" - Def Squad

== 1997 ==
=== Billy Porter - "Borrowed Time" ===
- A3. "Borrowed Time (Green Eyed Remix)"

=== Tha Truth! - Makin' Moves... Everyday ===
- 03. "I Wanna Know"
- 06. "What U Do 2 Me" (feat. Kenny Greene)
- 11. "Red Lights / Bustin' Out (On Funk)" (feat. Erick Sermon)

=== Warren G – Take a Look Over Your Shoulder ===
- B2. "I Shot the Sheriff (EPMD Radio Remix)"

=== Lyndon David Hall - "Do I Qualify?" ===
- B1. "Do I Qualify? (Def Squad Remix - No. 2 Rem"ix)
- B3. "Do I Qualify? (Def Squad Remix - No. 1 Remix)"

=== L.L. Cool J – Phenomenon ===
- 07. "4, 3, 2, 1" (feat. Method Man, DMX, Master P, Canibus & Redman)

=== EPMD – Back in Business ===
- 01. "Intro"
- 02. "Richter Scale"
- 03. "Da Joint" {co-produced by Rockwilder}
- 04. "Never Seen Before"
- 06. "Intrigued" (Feat. Das Efx)
- 07. "Last Man Standing" {co-produced by PMD}
- 08. "Get wit This"
- 09. "Do It Again"
- 10. "Apollo Interlude"
- 11. "You Gots 2 Chill '97" {co-produced by PMD}
- 13. "K.I.M. (Keep It Movin')" [feat. Def Squad]
- 16. "Never Seen Before (Remix)"

=== Various Artists - How to Be a Player (soundtrack) ===
- 14. "Down wit Us" - Redman

=== Various Artists - In tha Beginning...There Was Rap ===
- A2. "Rappers Delight" - Def Squad (found too on El Niño) {co-produced by T-Smoov}

== 1998 ==
=== Beverley Knight - "Rewind (Find a Way)" ===
- B2. "Rewind (Erick Sermon Mix)"

=== Def Squad – El Niño ===
- 02. "Check n' Me Out"
- 03. "Countdown" (feat. Jamal & PMD)
- 04. "Full Cooperation"
- 05. "Ride wit Us" (feat. Too Short) {found too on It's a Beautiful Thing}
- 07. "Rhymin' wit' Biz" (feat. Biz Markie)
- 08. "The Game" (Freestyle)
- 10. "Can U Dig It?"
- 12. "Y'all Niggas Ain't Ready"
- 13. "Say Word!"
- 14. "No Guest List"
- 16. "Def Squad Delite"

=== Beastie Boys - "Body Movin'" ===
- A4. "Body Movin' (Def Squad Remix)" [feat. Biz Markie, Erick Sermon & Redman]

=== Jay-Z – Vol. 2... Hard Knock Life ===
- 11. "Reservoir Dogs" (featuring The LOX, Beanie Sigel & Sauce Money) {co-produced by Rockwilder & Darold Trotter}

=== Method Man – Tical 2000: Judgement Day ===
- 18. "Step by Step"
- 24. "Big Dogs" (featuring Redman)

=== Redman – Doc's da Name 2000 ===
- 02. "Let da Monkey Out"
- 04. "Get It Live"
- 07. "Cloze Ya Doorz" (featuring Diezzel Don, Double-O, Gov Mattic, Roz and Young Zee)
- 08. "I Don't Kare" {co-produced by Redman}
- 09. "Boodah Break"
- 11. "Keep On '99"
- 12. "Well All Rite Cha" (featuring Method Man)
- 16. "Da Da DaHHH"
- 18. "Down South Funk" (featuring Def Squad)
- 19. "D.O.G.S."
- 22. "Brick City Mashin'"

=== Angie Stone - "No More Rain" ===
- "No More Rain (In This Cloud) (Remix)" [feat. Loon]

== 1999 ==
=== Dave Hollister - Ghetto Hymns ===
- 09. "Call on Me"
- 10. "Missin' You" {co-produced by Dave Hollister}
- 13. "The Program"

=== Heavy D – Heavy ===
- 07. "Ask Heaven" (feat. Chico DeBarge)
- 13. "You Nasty Hev"

=== Ja Rule – Venni Vetti Vecci ===
- 14. "E-Dub and Ja" (featuring Erick Sermon) [co-produced by Irv Gotti]

=== Too Short – Can't Stay Away ===
- 11. "Invasion of the Flat Booty Bitches"

=== EPMD - Out of Business ===
- 02. "Pioneers"
- 03. "Right Now"
- 05. "Symphony" (featuring M.O.P.)
- 06. "Hold Me Down"
- 07. "Rap Is Still Outta Control" {co-produced by PMD} [featuring Busta Rhymes]
- 08. "The Fan"
- 09. "Draw"
- 10. "U Got Shot" (featuring 215 & Agallah)
- 13. "Symphony 2000" (featuring Method Man & Redman and Lady Luck)

=== Chico DeBarge - "Soopaman Lover" ===
- A1. "Soopaman Lover" (Remix) [feat. Redman & Erick Sermon]

=== Method Man & Redman – Blackout! ===
- 02. "Blackout"
- 03. "Mi Casa"
- 04. "Y.O.U."
- 05. "4 Seasons" (featuring LL Cool J and Ja Rule)
- 08. "Tear It Off" (found too on In Too Deep (soundtrack))
- 11. "Maaad Crew"

=== Keith Murray – It's a Beautiful Thing ===
- 01. "Intro"
- 02. "When I Rap"
- 03. "Incredible" (feat. LL Cool J)
- 04. "Some Shit" (feat. Canibus and Déjà Vu)
- 06. "Slap Somebody"
- 07. "Secret Indictment"
- 08. "Radio"
- 09. "Intersection"
- 10. "Shut the Fuck Up"
- 11. "Interlude"
- 12. "Media"
- 13. "Life on the Street"
- 14. "Ride wit Us" (feat. Def Squad and Too Short)
- 15. "Jungle Boogie"
- 16. "High As Hell"
- 17. "Bad Day"
- 18. "A Message from Keith"
- 19. "My Life" (feat. Déjà Vu)

=== Various artists - The Corruptor (soundtrack) ===
- 12. "Be My Dirty Love" - Too Short (found too on You Nasty)

=== Funkmaster Flex - The Tunnel ===
- 10. "Okay" - Redman + Erick Sermon

== 2000 ==
=== 50 Cent - Power of the Dollar (EP version) ===
- 03. "Da Heatwave" (featuring Noreaga)

=== Various artists - Lyricist Lounge 2 ===
- 08. "W.K.Y.A." - Saukrates + Redman
- 12. "Battle" - Erick Sermon + Sy Scott

=== Dilated Peoples ===
- A1. "The Platform (Remix)" [feat. Erick Sermon]

=== Erick Sermon - Erick Onasis ===
- 01. "Talk to Me (Skit)"
- 03. "Don't Get Gassed"
- 04. "Why Not" (feat. Slick Rick)
- 06. "Hostility" (feat. Def Squad)
- 07. "Mastering with E (Skit)"
- 08. "So Sweet" (feat. Eazy-E)
- 09. "Focus" (feat. DJ Quik and Xzibit)
- 10. "Feel Me Baby" (feat. Khari and Sy Scott)
- 11. "Can't Stop" (feat. Dave Hollister and Peter Moore)
- 12. "Get da Money" (feat. Ja Rule)
- 14. "Sermon (Speech)"
- 15. "Vangundy" (feat. Big Kim, Billy Billions, Boe & Ruck, Nolan Epps, PMD, and Sy Scott)
- 16. "Fat Gold Chain" (feat. Too Short)

=== Scarface – The Last of a Dying Breed ===
- 04. "It Ain't Part II"

=== Xzibit – Restless ===
- 06. "Alkaholik" (featuring Erick Sermon, J-Ro & Tash)
- 09. "Double Time"

=== Various artists – Nutty Professor II: The Klumps (soundtrack) ===
- 05. "Even If" - Method Man
- 14. "Off the Wall" - Eminem + Redman

== 2001 ==
=== Redman – Malpractice ===
- 02. "Diggy Doc"
- 03. "Lick a Shot"
- 07. "Real Niggaz" (featuring Icarus, Mally G, Scarface and Treach)
- 09. "Da Bullshit" (featuring Icarus)
- 13. "J.U.M.P."
- 15. "Bricks Two" (featuring D-Don, Double-O, Roz, Shooga Bear and Pacewon)
- 16. "Wrong 4 Dat" (featuring Keith Murray)
- 21. "Soopaman Luva 5" (Part I)

=== Erick Sermon - Music ===
- 01. "Rapture"
- 03. "Come Thru"
- 04. "Music"
- 05. "Skit I"
- 06. "Now Whut's Up" (feat. Def Squad & Sy Scott)
- 07. "I'm That Nigga"
- 08. "Genius E Dub"
- 09. "Skit II"
- 10. "Ain't No Future...2001"
- 11. "Do-Re-Mi" (feat. LL Cool J & Scarface)
- 12. "I'm Hot"
- 13. "Up Them Thangs" (feat. Cadillac Tah & Keith Murray)
- 14. "The Sermon"
- 15. "Skit III"
- 16. "Music [Remix]" (feat. Def Squad)
- 17. "Headbanger 2001" (performed by EPMD) {Bonus Track}

=== Dave Hollister ===
- A1. "One Woman Man" (remix) [feat. Redman]

=== Various artists – How High (soundtrack) ===
- 02. "Part II" - Method Man & Redman

=== Rahsun ===
- A1. "What's My Name?" (feat. Erick Sermon)

=== Bowtie – Son of a Junkie ===
- 07. "Get Up"

== 2002 ==
=== Xzibit – Man vs. Machine ===
- 14. "Right On"

=== Xzibit – "Multiply" ===
- A1. "Multiply (Erick Sermon Remix)"

=== Erick Sermon - React ===
- 01. "Intro"
- 02. "Here I Iz"
- 04. "Party Right"
- 06. "Skit I"
- 08. "Love Iz"
- 09. "Go wit Me" {co-produced by Andre Ramseur}
- 10. "Skit II"
- 12. "Tell Me" (feat. MC Lyte & Rah Digga)
- 13. "Skit III"
- 14. "S.O.D." (feat. Icarus, Red Cafe & Sy Scott) {co-produced by Kaos}
- 15. "Hip Hop Radio"
- 16. "Skit IV (Khari)"
- 17. "Don't Give Up"

=== 50 Cent – Guess Who's Back? ===
- 18. "Doo Wop Freestyle"

=== Sy Scott ===
- A1. "Now What's Up" (feat. Def Squad)

== 2003 ==
=== DJ Envy – The Desert Storm Mixtape: Blok Party, Vol. 1 ===
- 03. "What, Why, Where, When" - Styles P

=== PMD – The Awakening ===
- 14. "Look at U Now" (feat. Erick Sermon)

=== Beyoncé ===
- A1. "Naughty Girl (Remix)" [feat. Redman]

=== Macy Gray ===
- A!. "She Ain't Right for You (Remix)" [feat. Redman]

=== Keith Murray – He's Keith Murray ===
- 04. "Yeah Yeah U Know It" {co-produced by Just Blaze}
- 09. "Sucka Free"
- 16. "Say Goodnite" {co-produced by Pete Rock}
- 17. "Child of the Streets (Man Child)" {co-produced by Keith Murray}

=== Ludacris – Chicken-n-Beer ===
- 11. "Hip Hop Quotables"

=== Troy S.L.U.G.S. - Troy S.L.U.G.S. ===
- 13. "Party Going On"
- 14. "Paradise"

=== Erick Sermon ===
- A1. "Close the Club" (feat. Redman, Sy Scott & Alfonzo Hunter)

=== Hit Squad – Zero Tolerance ===
- 03. "U Can't" - PMD

=== Amir - Sampler ===
- A6. "Lungees I Spit" (feat. Erick Sermon)

== 2004 ==
=== Tony Touch - The Piece Maker 2 ===
- 03. "How You Want It" (feat. Def Squad)

=== Erick Sermon - Chilltown, New York ===
- 01. "Home (Intro)"
- 02. "Wit Ee's"
- 03. "Relentless"
- 04. "Jackin' for Rhymes (Skit)"
- 05. "Street Hop" (feat. Redman & Tre)
- 06. "Chillin'" (feat. Talib Kweli & Whip Montez)
- 07. "Like Me"
- 08. "Matrix (Skit)"
- 09. "God Sent"
- 10. "I'm Not Him"
- 11. "MC One Bar (Skit)"
- 12. "Feel It" (feat. Sy Scott & Sean Paul)
- 13. "Future Thug" (feat. 11/29 & Redman)
- 14. "Do You Know"
- 15. "Listen" (feat. Keith Murray & Sy Scott)
- 16. "Hip Hop (Skit)"
- 17. "Can U Hear Me Now"

=== The Perceptionists – The Razor ===
- 02. "The Dope Intro" (co-produced by PMD)

=== Squabble ===
- A1. "Push Back"

=== Dray ===
- A1. "I Live it"

== 2005 ==
=== Bizarre - Hannicap Circus ===
- 14. "Bad Day"

=== Various - The Longest Yard (soundtrack) ===
- 06. "So Fly" - Akon + Blewz

=== Boyz n da Hood – Boyz n da Hood ===
- 06. "Gangstas"

== 2006 ==
=== The Black Eyed Peas - Renegotiations: The Remixes ===
- 02. "Ba Bump (Erick Sermon Remix)"

=== Busta Rhymes – The Big Bang ===
- 09. "Goldmine" (featuring Raekwon) {co-produced by Dr. Dre}

=== Method Man – 4:21... The Day After ===
- 03. "Problem"
- 07. "Dirty Mef" (feat. Ol' Dirty Bastard) {co-produced by Mathematics}
- 12. "Got to Have It"
- 13. "Say"
- 17. "Walk On" (feat. Redman) {co-produced by RZA and Versatile}

=== Keith Murray ===
- 01. "One 4 da Money"

== 2007 ==
=== Redman – Red Gone Wild: Thee Album ===
- 09. "Walk in Gutta" (featuring Def Squad & Biz Markie)
- 12. "Rite Now"
- 21. "Soopaman Luva 6 (Part I)" [featuring E3, Hurricane G and Melanie Rutherford]

=== Keith Murray – Rap-Murr-Phobia (The Fear of Real Hip-Hop) ===
- 01. Walk Up (Skit) feat. Tone Capone
- 02. Da Fuckery
- 03. Weeble Wobble
- 04. Don't Fuck wit Em'
- 05. I Love It When It Rains (Skit)
- 06. U Ain't Nobody feat. Def Squad
- 07. Do
- 08. Nobody Do It Better feat. Tyrese & Junior
- 09. Hustle On
- 10. Whatmakeaniggathinkdat feat. Lil Jamal
- 11. What It Is feat. Method Man and 50 Grand
- 12. We Ridin feat. L.O.D.
- 13. Da Beef Murray Show (Skit) feat. Taya and Baggy Bones
- 14. Never Did Shit feat. Unique
- 15. Something Like a Model feat. Junior
- 16. Late Night feat. L.O.D., Ming Bolla, Bosie & Ryze
- 17. Hey Ladies {Bonus Track}
- 18. Real in the Field {Bonus Track}

=== Infamous Mobb - Reality Rap ===
- 04. "Betti Bye Bye"

=== Vic Damone ===
- 01. "Why U Mad" (feat. Joell Ortiz)
- 02. "Fuck 'Em"

== 2008 ==
=== EPMD - We Mean Business ===
- 02. "What You Talkin'" (feat. Havoc)
- 03. "Roc-Da-Spot"
- 04. "Blow" {co-produced by JFK}
- 05. "Run It" (feat. KRS-One)
- 07. "Listen Up" (feat. Teddy Riley)
- 08. "Bac Stabbers" {co-produced with PMD}
- 13. "Actin' Up" (feat. Vic D, Tre)

== 2009 ==
=== Method Man & Redman – Blackout! 2 ===
- 04. "Dangerous MCees"
- 15. "Neva Herd Dis B4"

=== Ja Rule – The Mirror ===
- 09. "Ladies"

=== Raekwon – Only Built 4 Cuban Linx... Pt. II ===
- 10. "Baggin Crack"

=== The Undergods – Canibus and Keith Murray Are the Undergods ===
- 01. "129"
- 04. "Gotta Be Real"
- 05. "Stop Frontin'"
- 07. "Show 'N Prove"

== 2011 ==
=== Raekwon - Shaolin vs. Wu-Tang ===
- 02. "Every Soldier in the Hood" (feat. Method Man)

== 2012 ==
=== Ghostface Killah & Sheek Louch - Wu Block ===
- 12. "Do It Like Us" (featuring Raekwon)

== 2013 ==
=== Tony Touch – The Piece Maker 3: Return of the 50 MC's ===
- 23. "Let's Go" (feat. Erick Sermon, Method Man & Redman)

== 2015 ==
=== Erick Sermon - E.S.P. (Erick Sermon's Perception) ===
- 01. "The Sermon"
- 02. "Daydreamer" (feat. The Voice & Too Short)
- 03. "Angry" (feat. The Voice)
- 04. "Lyrics"
- 05. "Make Room" (feat. Joell Ortiz & Sheek Louch)
- 06. "Serious" (feat. Syleena Johnson)
- 07. "One Shot" (feat. Masspike Miles)
- 08. "Jokes"
- 09. "Clutch" (feat. Method Man & Redman)
- 10. "With You" (feat. Faith Evans)
- 11. "Culture" (feat. Fish Grease & Twone Gabz)
- 12. "Still Gettin' It" (feat. Krayzie Bone & Ryize)
- 13. "Neva Take" (feat. Fred Da Godson & Keith Murray)
- 14. "Jack Move" (feat. Jarren Benton)
- 15. "Impostors"

== 2017 ==
=== Bell Biv DeVoe - Three Stripes ===
- 05. "Run"

== 2018 ==
=== Krazy Drayz - Showtime ===
- 11. "I Like It"

=== Termanology - Bad Decisions ===
- 08. "Are You Sure"

=== P Wise ===
- 01. "Heart of the City"

== 2019 ==
=== Erick Sermon - Vernia ===
- 02. "Wake Up/No Fear"
- 04. "Tha Game" (feat. AZ & Styles P) {co-produced with Mic Cheks}
- 05. "Go" (feat. No Malice, TryBishop & Kaelyn Kastle)
- 07. "That Girl" (feat. Big K.R.I.T. & Ricco Barrino)
- 08. "Cabinet"
- 09. "Stay Real Part 2" (feat. Nature & Keith Murray)

=== Sean Strange - Street Urchin ===
- 06. "Rap Science" {co-produced by Rockwilder}
- 11. Peppers & Eggs

== 2020 ==
=== Joell Ortiz & Crooked I - H.A.R.D. ===
- 02. "Get Ya Money" (co-produced by Boogeyman)

=== Conway the Machine - From King to a God ===
- 11. "Forever Droppin Tears" (feat. El Camino) (co-produced by Rockwilder)

== 2022 ==
=== Method Man - Meth Lab Season 3: The Rehab ===
- 07. "Act Up" (feat. 5th PXWER)

== 2024 ==
=== Redman - Muddy Waters Too ===
- 07. "Don't U Miss"

== Other ==
=== Mr. Cheeks ===
- "Get Up the Volume" (feat. Keith Murray)
- "Make Music"

=== Bizarre ===
- "Holla at Cha"
