= Out of Business =

Studio album by EPMD
- Released: July 20, 1999
- Recorded: 1998–1999
- Studio: Mirror Image Recordings East (Dix Hills, NY); Mirror Image Recorders (New York, NY); Northshore Soundworks (New York, NY); Ian London (Long Island, NY)
- Genre: Hip hop
- Length: 47:15
- Label: Def Jam
- Producer: EPMD; DJ Scratch; Agallah

EPMD chronology
Back in Business (1997)	Out of Business (1999)	We Mean Business (2008)

Singles from Out of Business
- 1. "Right Now" Released: June 8, 1999; 2. "Symphony 2000" Released: June 29, 1999; 3. "Pioneers" Released: August 24, 1999

Professional ratings
Review scores
Source	Rating
AllMusic	4/5 stars
Entertainment Weekly	A−
NME	3/10
RapReviews	3.5/10
The New Rolling Stone Album Guide	2/5 stars
The Source	4/5 stars

Out of Business is the sixth studio album by American hip hop duo EPMD. The album was originally scheduled for a December 1998 release under Def Jam Recordings, but had been delayed numerous times as a result of a merger between Seagram's PolyGram (Def Jam's parent company) and Universal Music Group's MCA Records, combining Def Jam and Island Records' operations together under the Island Def Jam Music Group. Ultimately, the album was released on July 20, 1999. It is the first official Def Jam album released under the newly-formed Island Def Jam Music Group and the group's last album released under the label as they left the imprint a year later before going inactive for the second time.

The recording sessions took place at Mirror Image Studio East in Dix Hills, Mirror Image Recorders and Northshore Soundworks in New York and Ian London Studios in Long Island. The album was produced by members Erick Sermon and PMD, as well as DJ Scratch, with 8-Off Agallah serving as co-producer. It features guest appearances from 215, 8-Off Agallah, Busta Rhymes, Lady Luck, Method Man, M.O.P., and Redman. The album peaked at number 13 on the Billboard 200 and number 2 on the Top R&B/Hip-Hop Albums in the United States, with 73,000 units sold in its first week. Its only single, "Symphony 2000", reached only No. 62 on the Hot R&B/Hip-Hop Songs, No. 28 on the Hot Rap Songs and No. 58 on the R&B/Hip-Hop Airplay in the US.

The duo changed its initialism for the release from 'Erick & Parrish Making Dollars' to 'Erick & Parrish Millennium Ducats'. A limited-edition issue of the album was released with a bonus greatest hits album.

== Track listing ==
Out Of Business
No.	Title	Writer(s)	Producer(s)	Length
1.	"Intro"	Erick Sermon; Parrish Smith; George Spivey; William Conti	DJ Scratch	2:18
2.	"Pioneers"	Sermon; P. Smith	Erick Sermon	3:14
3.	"Right Now"	Sermon; P. Smith	Erick Sermon	3:51
4.	"Check 1, 2"	Sermon; P. Smith; Angel Aguilar	PMD; 8-Off Agallah (co.)	3:16
5.	"Symphony" (featuring M.O.P.)	Sermon; P. Smith; Eric Murray; Jamal Grinnage	Erick Sermon	3:01
6.	"Hold Me Down"	Sermon; P. Smith	Erick Sermon	3:34
7.	"Rap Is Still Outta Control" (featuring Busta Rhymes)	Sermon; P. Smith; Trevor Smith	PMD; Erick Sermon (co.)	3:33
8.	"The Fan"	Sermon; P. Smith	Erick Sermon	3:03
9.	"Draw"	Sermon; P. Smith; Dominic Frontiere	Erick Sermon	3:22
10.	"U Got Shot" (featuring 215 and 8-Off Agallah)	Sermon; P. Smith; Alec Nathaniel; Aguilar; Russell Jones; Derek Harris; Dennis Coles; Robert Diggs	Erick Sermon	3:38
11.	"House Party"	Sermon; P. Smith	PMD	3:52
12.	"The Funk"	Sermon; P. Smith; Norman Whitfield; Dwight Turner	PMD	2:08
13.	"Symphony 2000" (featuring Redman, Method Man and Lady Luck)	Sermon; P. Smith; Reggie Noble; Clifford Smith; Chanelle Jones	Erick Sermon	4:03
14.	"Jane 6"	Sermon; P. Smith; Rick James	PMD	4:22
Total length:				47:15

Sample credits

- Track 1 contains a sample from "Fanfare for Rocky" written and performed by Bill Conti.
- Track 9 contains a sample from "Hang 'Em High" written and performed by Dominic Frontiere.
- Track 10 contains a sample from "Brooklyn Zoo" written by Russell Jones, Dennis Coles, Robert Diggs and Derrick Harris as performed by Ol' Dirty Bastard.
- Track 12 contains a sample from "Do Your Dance" written by Norman Whitfield and Dwight Turner as performed by Rose Royce.
- Track 14 contains a sample from "Mary Jane" written and performed by Rick James.

== Personnel ==
- Erick Sermon — vocals, producer (tracks: 2, 3, 5, 6, 8–10, 13), co-producer (track 7), mixing (tracks: 2, 5–14), executive producer, sleeve notes
- Parrish "PMD" Smith — vocals, producer (tracks: 4, 7, 11, 12, 14), mixing (tracks: 2, 5–8, 10), executive producer, sleeve notes
- Eric "Billy Danze" Murray — vocals (track 5)
- Jamal "Lil' Fame" Grinnage — vocals (track 5)
- Trevor "Busta Rhymes" Smith — vocals (track 7)
- Alec "215" Nathaniel — vocals (track 10)
- Angel "8-Off Agallah" Aguilar — vocals (track 10)
- Reginald "Redman" Noble — vocals (track 13)
- Clifford "Method Man" Smith — vocals (track 13)
- Chanelle "Lady Luck" Jones — vocals (track 13)
- George "DJ Scratch" Spivey — producer (track 1)
- Marc Berto — recording (tracks: 2, 4, 6, 8, 12), mix engineer assistant (track 5), recording engineer assistant (tracks: 7, 9–11, 13, 14)
- Charlie Marotta — recording & mixing (track 3)
- John Decatur — recording (tracks: 5, 7)
- Tommy Uzzo — recording (tracks: 9–11, 13, 14), mixing (tracks: 2, 4–14)
- Richard A. LaSalvia — recording engineer assistant
- Camilio Rodriguez — recording engineer assistant
- Dave O'Donnell — recording engineer assistant
- Tony Dawsey — mastering
- Kevin Liles — executive producer
- The Drawing Board — art direction, design
- Wayne Van Acker — design
- Danny Clinch — photography
- Gerard Gaskin — photography
- Richard Iohr — photography
- Alvin Toney — sleeve notes

== Greatest Hits bonus disc ==
Professional ratings
Review scores
Source	Rating
AllMusic	4.5/5 stars
The New Rolling Stone Album Guide	4/5 stars

Greatest Hits
No.	Title	Writer(s)	Producer(s)	Length
1.	"It's My Thang"	Erick Sermon; Parrish Smith; August Moon	EPMD	5:37
2.	"You Gots 2 Chill"	Sermon; P. Smith; Roger Troutman	EPMD	3:27
3.	"Strictly Business"	Sermon; P. Smith	EPMD	4:39
4.	"So What Cha Sayin'"	Sermon; P. Smith; Allen Williams	EPMD	4:28
5.	"Big Payback"	Sermon; P. Smith	EPMD	4:04
6.	"Get the Bozack"	Sermon; P. Smith	EPMD	4:33
7.	"Please Listen to My Demo"	Sermon; P. Smith	EPMD	2:49
8.	"Gold Digger"	Sermon; P. Smith; George Clinton; Ronald Miller	EPMD; Mr. Bozack (co.)	5:02
9.	"Rampage"	Sermon; P. Smith	EPMD; Mr. Bozack (co.)	3:49
10.	"Crossover"	Sermon; P. Smith; Troutman; David Gamson	EPMD	3:48
11.	"Headbanger"	Sermon; P. Smith; Clinton; Ed Greene	EPMD; Mr. Bozack (co.)	4:51
12.	"Never Seen Before"	Sermon; P. Smith; Joseph Modeliste; Leo Nocentelli	Erick Sermon	2:50
13.	"Da Joint"	Sermon; P. Smith; Dana Stinson; James Brown; Michael Diamond; Adam Yauch; Matt Dike; John King; Michael Simpson	Erick Sermon; Rockwilder	3:26
Total length:				1:40:38

Notes

- Track 1 is a re-recording of "It's My Thing" from 1988 Strictly Business.
- Track 2 is a re-recording of "You Gots to Chill" from 1988 Strictly Business, which previously appeared in 1997 Back in Business as "You Gots 2 Chill '97".
- Track 3 is a re-recording of the song of the same from 1988 Strictly Business.
- Track 4 is a re-recording of "So Wat Cha Sayin'" from 1989 Unfinished Business.
- Track 5 is a re-recording of "The Big Payback" from 1989 Unfinished Business.
- Tracks 6 and 7 are re-recordings of the songs of the same names from 1989 Unfinished Business.
- Tracks 8 and 9 are taken from 1990 Business as Usual.
- Tracks 10 and 11 are taken from 1992 Business Never Personal.
- Tracks 12 and 13 are taken from 1997 Back in Business.

=== Personnel ===
- Erick Sermon — vocals, producer
- Parrish "PMD" Smith — vocals, producer (tracks: 1–11)
- Mr. Bozack — co-producer (tracks: 8, 9, 11)
- Charlie Marotta — mixing (tracks: 1, 3–7)
- Tommy Uzzo — mixing (tracks: 2, 10, 12, 13)
- Ivan 'Doc' Rodriguez — mixing (tracks: 8, 9, 11, 13)
- Dave Greenberg — mixing (track 11)

== Charts ==
Chart (1999)	Peak position
UK R&B Albums (OCC)	18
US Billboard 200	13
US Top R&B/Hip-Hop Albums (Billboard)	2
