= Hit Squad =

American hip hop group

- Genre: East Coast hip hop
- Years active: 1990–2000; 2006–present
- Spinoffs: Def Squad
- Members: EPMD; DJ Scratch; Redman; Das EFX; K-Solo; Knucklehedz; Keith Murray; Sam Sneed
- Past members: Hurricane G Top Quality; Jesse West; RKITECH

The Hit Squad is an American hip hop collective of East Coast hip hop artists. Originally formed in the 1990s by Erick Sermon and Parrish Smith of the rap group EPMD, the group included rap artists such as K-Solo, Sam Sneed,Redman, Das EFX, Top Quality, and Knucklehedz. When EPMD broke up for the first time in 1993, the collective separated, with Sermon forming Def Squad and Smith retaining the Hit Squad name.

== Career ==
After the success of their debut album Strictly Business, EPMD sought to mentor new artists. The first artist to make a guest appearance on an EPMD album was K-Solo. Solo was featured on their second album Unfinished Business on the song "Knick Knack Patty Wack". The first mention of "Hit Squad" appeared on EPMD's third album Business as Usual on the track "Hit Squad Heist". The lyrics mention Redman, K-Solo and Tom J of Knucklehedz. Redman is also featured on two tracks of that album.

In 1993, EPMD released the single "Headbanger" from their fourth album Business Never Personal. The single featured K-Solo and Redman and the music video features appearances by most of the Hit Squad. The single reached #11 on Billboard's Hot Rap Tracks chart. The single's success made "Headbanger" the Squad's "signature song". The album also features Das EFX on the track "Cummin' At Cha".

== Breakup ==
In late 1992, tensions grew within the Hit Squad. According to an article in The Source, squad members alleged financial impropriety by Smith, who owned their management company. Smith's home was invaded by armed intruders believed to have been hired by squad members. While Smith declined to publicly give details on who was behind the invasion, Sermon was arrested and briefly detained for questioning, but no charges were filed. EPMD officially broke up in January 1993. Redman and Hurricane G continued to collaborate with Sermon, while Das EFX and DJ Scratch remained under Smith's management. K-Solo & Sam Sneed pursued separate endeavors being signed to Death Row Records by Dr.Dre. The debut album by Knucklehedz became lost in the shuffle in the midst of the breakup and was shelved.

The original Hit Squad splintered into two different groups. Sermon formed Def Squad with Redman, Jamal aka Mally G and another protégé Keith Murray while PMD retained the Hit Squad name with Das EFX, DJ Scratch and Top Quality. In this new incarnation, the PMD led Hit Squad would appear on PMD's solo albums and on the Das EFX albums Hold It Down and Generation EFX. Hit Squad would also appear on the single and video for the song "Beef" from Chubb Rock's 1997 album The Mind. On the album The Mix Tape, Vol. II by Funkmaster Flex, a freestyle by PMD, Nocturnal & Das EFX was featured on the album. Smith appeared alongside rap unknowns Blast, Poogi and L The Pro on the classic 1997 Tony Touch mixtape Power Cypha 2, credited as "PMD & The Hit Squad".

On EPMD's 1997 reunion album Back in Business, Smith's Hit Squad and Sermon's Def Squad came together and were billed as The Squadron. Both groups are featured in the video for the single "Da Joint".

In 2004, Smith released an album titled Hit Squad: Zero Tolerance using previously unreleased verses by the original members combined with his latest new artists.

As of the 2006 EPMD reunion, most of the former Hit Squad members also reunited, along with Def Squad rapper Keith Murray. A new album for the Hit Squad/Def Squad is planned.

Another reunion was staged in 2012.

On PMD's 2013 EP release New Business, he introduced a group under the Hit Squad umbrella called Team Takeover made up of rappers Nymrod, Comatose, Nam Nitty, and Michael Nixx. The group is featured in the music video for the track "Symphony 2013".
