= Strictly Business =

Strictly Business may refer to:

- Strictly Business (EPMD album), an album by EPMD
  - "Strictly Business" (EPMD song), the debut single by EPMD from its debut album, Strictly Business
- Strictly Business (Haystak & Jelly Roll album), 2011
- Strictly Business (1931 film), a 1931 British comedy film directed by Mary Field and Jacqueline Logan
- Strictly Business (1962 film), a 1962 Soviet film based on O. Henry stories
- Strictly Business (1991 film), a 1991 American comedy film directed by Kevin Hooks
  - Strictly Business (soundtrack), the soundtrack to the 1991 comedy film, Strictly Business
  - Strictly Business (LL Cool J song), from the soundtrack to the 1991 film
- Strictly Business (professional wrestling), a professional wrestling stable in National Wrestling Alliance
