= Adam Bernstein =

American film director (born 1960)

- Born: May 7, 1960 (age 66); Princeton, New Jersey, U.S.
- Education: Princeton University
- Occupations: Film director, music video director, television director
- Years active: 1986–present
- Spouse: Jessica Hecht (m. 1995)
- Children: 2

Adam Bernstein (born May 7, 1960) is an American film director, music video director and television director. For his work on the television show Fargo in 2014, he received a nomination for the Primetime Emmy Award for Outstanding Directing for a Miniseries, Movie or a Dramatic Special. In 2007, he won a Primetime Emmy Award for Outstanding Comedy Series for his work on 30 Rock.

== Biography ==
Bernstein was born in Princeton, New Jersey, and is of half Jewish and half Italian ancestry. In 1973, he was the recipient of the Good Citizenship Medal from the Daughters of the American Revolution. A member of the Princeton University Class of 1982, Bernstein began his career as an animator.

He directed Nickelodeon’s first original live-action, scripted comedy, The Adventures of Pete & Pete, in 1993. His work as a director includes over seventy music videos, amongst which are "Love Shack" for the B-52's, "Hey Ladies" for the Beastie Boys and "Baby Got Back" for Sir Mix-a-Lot. He directed the pilots for Fargo, 30 Rock, Scrubs, Alpha House and Strangers with Candy, and multiple episodes of Oz and Breaking Bad.

Bernstein has been married to actress Jessica Hecht since 1995. Later, they both worked on Breaking Bad, in which she starred as Gretchen, with Bernstein directing at least one episode on all five seasons on the show.

He was an adjunct faculty member at Williams College teaching theatre and filmmaking along with his wife.

== Television credits ==
- Costiera (2025)
- Before (2024)
- Silo (2024)
- The Sinner (2020)
- City on a Hill (2019)
- Weird City (2019)
- Fosse/Verdon (2019)
- Sneaky Pete (2018)
- Sweetbitter (2018)
- The Mist (2017)
- Doubt (2017)
- Orange Is the New Black (2016)
- Outsiders (2016)
- The Brink (2015)
- Nurse Jackie (2015)
- Bloodline (2015)
- Better Call Saul (2015–2018)
- Fargo (2014)
- Masters of Sex (2014)
- Next Caller (2013)
- Alpha House (2013)
- House of Lies (2012-2013)
- The Big C (2012)
- Smash (2012)
- A Gifted Man (2012)
- Shameless (2011)
- Bored to Death (2011)
- Parenthood (2010)
- Californication (2008–2014)
- Breaking Bad (2008–2012)
- 30 Rock (2006): Won Primetime Emmy Award for Outstanding Comedy Series
- The Bedford Diaries (2006) directed pilot episode
- Scrubs (2001–2007)
- Ed (2001–2003)
- Entourage (2004)
- The Job (2002)
- Oz (1999–2003)
- Action (1999–2000)
- Homicide: Life on the Street (1999)
- Strangers with Candy (1999)
- The Adventures of Pete & Pete (1993)

== Selected music video credits ==
- "Alternative Girlfriend" by Barenaked Ladies (1995)
- "Headache" by Frank Black (1994)
- "Push th' Little Daisies" by Ween (1993)
- "Baby Got Back" by Sir Mix-a-Lot (1992)
- "American Music" by Violent Femmes (1991)
- "Rockaway" by Ric Ocasek (1990)
- "Hey Ladies" by the Beastie Boys (1989)
- "Love Shack" by The B-52's (1989)
- "Hawaiian Sophie" by Jaz (1989)
- "So Wat Cha Sayin'" by EPMD (1989)
- "Punk Rock Girl" by The Dead Milkmen (1989)
- "Black Steel in the Hour of Chaos" by Public Enemy (1988)
- "You Gots to Chill" by EPMD (1988)
- "I Don't Care" by Audio Two (1988)
- 7 music videos by They Might Be Giants (1986–1992)

== Film directing credits ==
- It's Pat (1994)
- Six Ways to Sunday (1997) (also writer)
- Bad Apple (2004)
