= Symphony 2000 =

Single by EPMD featuring Method Man & Redman and Lady Luck

from the album Out of Business
- B-side: "Right Now"
- Released: June 29, 1999
- Studio: Mirror Image Recordings East (Dix Hills, New York)
- Genre: Hip hop
- Length: 4:03
- Label: Def Jam
- Songwriters: Erick Sermon; Parrish Smith
- Producer: Erick Sermon

EPMD singles chronology
"Richter Scale" (1997)	"Symphony 2000" (1999)

Method Man & Redman singles chronology
"How High" (1995)	"Symphony 2000" (1999)	"Tear It Off" (1999)

Redman singles chronology
"Let Da Monkey Out" (1999)	"Symphony 2000" (1999)	"Tear It Off" (1999)

Method Man singles chronology
"Break Ups 2 Make Ups" (1999)	"Symphony 2000" (1999)	"Tear It Off" (1999)

Music video
- "Symphony 2000" on YouTube

"Symphony 2000" is the lead single released from EPMD's sixth album, Out of Business. The song was produced by Erick Sermon and featured verses from EPMD's labelmates, Method Man & Redman and Lady Luck. "Symphony 2000" was EPMD's last charting single making it to the R&B and rap charts.

The song sampled the famous main title song from the movie Uccellacci e Uccellini, directed by italian director Pier Paolo Pasolini and composed by Ennio Morricone. The song was sung by Italian actor and singer Domenico Modugno.

== Single track listing ==
1. "Symphony 2000" (Radio Edit)
2. "Symphony 2000" (LP Version)
3. "Symphony 2000" (Instrumental)
4. "Right Now" (Radio Edit)
5. "Right Now" (LP Version)
6. "Right Now" (Instrumental)

== Charts ==
=== Weekly charts ===
Chart (1999)	Peak position
US Hot R&B/Hip-Hop Songs (Billboard)	62
US Hot Rap Songs (Billboard)	28
US R&B/Hip-Hop Airplay (Billboard)	58
