= Nice and Smooth (album) =

Nice & Smooth

Studio album by Nice & Smooth
- Released: 1989
- Recorded: 1988−1989
- Genre: Hip hop
- Length: 54:31
- Labels: Fresh/Sleeping Bag (U.S.); LPRE-13 (first pressing); Priority/EMI (U.S.); 0499 2 53887 2 5 P2-53887 (second pressing); Priority/Virgin/EMI (Europe); 7243 8 40117 2 7 V2-40117
- Producers: Nice & Smooth

Nice & Smooth chronology
Nice & Smooth (1989)	Ain't a Damn Thing Changed (1991)

Professional ratings
Review scores
Source	Rating
AllMusic	3/5 stars

Nice & Smooth is the debut studio album by American hip-hop duo Nice & Smooth, from The Bronx, NY. It was released on May 16, 1989, via Fresh Records and Sleeping Bag Records. The album is notable for its sense of humor and comedy rhymes. The singles were "Early to Rise" and "Funky for You". It is included in The Source's "100 Best Rap Albums". It was one of three titles acquired by Priority Records when Sleeping Bag went out of business in 1992.

== Track listing ==
1. "Early to Rise"
2. "Something I Can't Explain"
3. "Perfect Harmony"
4. "We Are No. 1"
5. "No Delayin'"
6. "Funky for You"
7. "Skill Trade"
8. "More and More Hits"
9. "O-o-h, Child"
10. "Hit Me"
11. "Gold"
12. "Dope Not Hype"
13. "Nice & Smooth"
14. "Dope on a Rope"
15. "Sum Pimped-out Shit"

== Personnel ==
- Peter Bodtke — Photography
- D-Square — Engineer
- DJ Teddy Tedd — Turntables
- Nice & Smooth — Main Performer
- Greg Nice — Producer, Mixing
- Ivan “Doc” Rodriguez — Engineer
- Smooth B. — Producer, Mixing
- Howie Weinberg — Mastering
