= So Wat Cha Sayin' =

Single by EPMD

from the album Unfinished Business
- Released: March 17, 1989
- Recorded: 1988
- Genre: Hip hop
- Length: 4:57
- Label: Fresh
- Songwriters: Erick Sermon, Parrish Smith
- Producers: EPMD, DJ Scratch

EPMD singles chronology
"I'm Housin" (1988)	"So Wat Cha Sayin'" (1989)	"Gold Digger" (1990)

"So Wat Cha Sayin'" is the first single released from, EPMD's second album, Unfinished Business. Produced by EPMD with scratches provided by DJ Scratch, "So Wat Cha Sayin'" made it to three Billboard charts, peaking at #5 on the Hot Rap Singles. The video was directed by Adam Bernstein, who previously directed EPMD's 1988 video for "You Gots to Chill".

The song samples One Nation Under A Groove (song) by Funkadelic, and "If It Don't Turn You On (You Oughta' Leave It Alone)" by B.T. Express. The drums were sampled from a dubplate of "Fairplay" by Soul II Soul that Erick Sermon was given by a DJ while EPMD was in London on tour.

In 2001, Beanie Sigel & Memphis Bleek did a cover version of this song on a song of the same name on Beanie Sigel's The Reason (Beanie Sigel album) album with Beanie covering Erick Sermon's verses & Bleek covering Parrish Smith's verses.

== Track listing ==
1. "So Wat Cha Sayin'" (Club Version) – 4:55
2. "So Wat Cha Sayin'" (Dub Version) – 4:53
3. "So Wat Cha Sayin'" (Radio Version) – 3:45

== Charts ==
Chart (1989)	Peak position
US Hot R&B Singles	23
US Hot Rap Singles	5
US Hot Dance Music/Maxi-Singles Sales	40
