= I'm Housin =

Single by EPMD

from the album Strictly Business
- B-side: "Get Off the Bandwagon"
- Released: 1989
- Recorded: 1988
- Genre: Hip hop
- Length: 4:01
- Label: Fresh
- Songwriter(s): Erick Sermon, Parrish Smith
- Producer(s): EPMD

EPMD singles chronology
"Strictly Business" (1988)	"I'm Housin" (1989)	"So Wat Cha Sayin'" (1989)

"I'm Housin" is the third and final single released from EPMD's debut album, Strictly Business. It peaked at No. 28 on the Hot Rap Singles chart. "I'm Housin" features a prominent sample of "Rock Steady" by Aretha Franklin.

== Track listing ==
=== A-side ===
1. "I'm Housin'" (Vocal) – 4:15
2. "I'm Housin'" (Instrumental) – 4:11
3. "I'm Housin'" (UK Mix) – 5:30

=== B-side ===
1. "Get Off the Bandwagon" (Vocal) – 5:07
2. "Get Off the Bandwagon" (Instrumental) – 5:03

== Cover versions ==
Rage Against the Machine covered I'm Housin on their album Renegades.
