= The Tunnel (album) =

Studio album by Funkmaster Flex and Big Kap
- Released: December 7, 1999
- Recorded: 1993, 1999
- Venue: Madison Square Garden (New York City)
- Studio: Mirror Image Times Square (New York City); Quad Recording Studios (New York City); Criteria (Miami); Chung King (New York City); The Hit Factory (New York City); Enterprise (California); Electric Lady (New York City); Erick Sermon (Long Island, N.Y.); Sound On Sound (New York City); Sony (New York City); Soundtrack (New York City); Cash Money (New Orleans); Battery (New York City); Big Noise (New York City)
- Genre: Hardcore hip hop
- Length: 1:09:15
- Label: Def Jam
- Producer: Funkmaster Flex (also exec.); Big Kap (also exec.); Darrell "Digga" Branch; DJ Head; DJ Riz; DJ Scratch; DJ Sizzahandz; DJ Twinz; Erick Sermon; EZ Elpee; Irv Gotti; Jocko; JoJo Brim; Lil' Rob; Mannie Fresh; Rahim; Ric Rude; Rockwilder; Robert 'Shim' Kirkland; Cipha Sounds; Dart La

Funkmaster Flex chronology
The Mix Tape Volume III: 60 Minutes of Funk (The Final Chapter) (1998)	The Tunnel (1999)	60 Minutes of Funk, Volume IV: The Mixtape (2000)

Singles from The Tunnel
- 1. "We In Here / Real G's" Released: November 30, 1999; 2. "Ill Bomb / Confrontation" Released: February 29, 2000

Professional ratings
Review scores
Source	Rating
AllMusic	4.5/5 stars

The Tunnel is a collaborative album by American DJs Funkmaster Flex and Big Kap. It was released on December 7, 1999, via Def Jam Recordings.

Recording sessions took place at Mirror Image Times Square, at Madison Square Garden, at Quad Recording Studios, at Chung King Studios, at The Hit Factory, at Electric Lady Studios, at Sound On Sound, at Sony Music Studios, at Soundtrack Recording Studios, at Battery Studios and at Big Noise Studios in New York City, at Criteria Studios in Miami, at Enterprise Studios in California, at Erick Sermon Studios in Long Island, and at Cash Money Studios in New Orleans.

Production was handled by several record producers, including Rockwilder, Irv Gotti, Mannie Fresh, DJ Scratch, Funk Flex and Big Kap themselves. It features guest appearances from Beanie Sigel, 2Pac, Amil, Angie Martinez, B.G., Black Child, Caddillac Tah, Capone-N-Noreaga, DMX, Drag-On, Dr. Dre, Dutch & Spade, Eminem, Erick Sermon, Eve, Fatman Scoop, Ja Rule, Jay-Z, Jinx Da Juvy, Juvenile, Kool G Rap, Lady Luck, Lil' Kim, Lil Wayne, LL Cool J, Mary J. Blige, Memphis Bleek, Method Man, Nas, Notorious B.I.G., Prodigy, Raekwon, Redman, Snoop Dogg, Swizz Beatz and The Lox.

The album peaked at number 35 on the Billboard 200, at number 3 on the Top R&B/Hip-Hop Albums, and was certified gold by the Recording Industry Association of America on March 7, 2000. It spawned two singles: "We In Here" with DMX, Eve, Styles P, Sheek Louch, Jadakiss, Drag-On and Swizz Beatz (b/w "Real G's" with Snoop Dogg), and "Confrontation" with Mary J. Blige (b/w "Ill Bomb" with LL Cool J).

== Track listing ==
No.	Title	Writer(s)	Producer(s)	Length
1.	"Intro" (featuring Pain In Da Ass)	A. Taylor; W. Hirschorn; K. Bell; S. Bono	Funkmaster Flex; DJ Head	2:11
2.	"Biggie/Tupac Live Freestyle" (featuring Mister Cee, Notorious B.I.G. and 2Pac)	C. Wallace; T. Shakur		1:49
3.	"We In Here" (featuring Ruff Ryders)	A. Taylor; E. Simmons; E. Jeffries; D. Styles; S. Jacobs; J. Phillips; M. Smalls; K. Dean; J. Parker; C. Cason	Funkmaster Flex; Dart La^{[a]}	4:23
4.	"If I Get Locked Up" (featuring Eminem and Dr. Dre)	M. Mathers; A. Young; D. Stinson	Rockwilder	3:40
5.	"Real G's" (featuring Snoop Dogg)	A. Taylor; C. Broadus; L. Diaz; J. Forman; E. Wrubel; M. DeBarge; E. DeBarge; E. DeBarge; J. Bedford; S. Striplin; R. Ayers; C. Fredrick; E. Rudnicki	Funkmaster Flex; Cipha Sounds^{[a]}	3:46
6.	"True" (featuring Method Man)	C. Smith; D. Stinson	Rockwilder	2:43
7.	"Q.B.G." (featuring Prodigy and Kool G Rap)	A. Johnson; N. Wilson; R. Grant; R. Grant	DJ Twinz	2:53
8.	"K.I.M. Interlude" (featuring Lil' Kim)	A. Taylor; K. Jones; L. Diaz; E. Barrier; C. Bobbit; J. Brown; B. Byrd; W. Griffin	Funkmaster Flex; Cipha Sounds^{[a]}	0:31
9.	"Confrontation" (featuring Mary J. Blige)	A. Taylor; M. Blige; J. Brim; J. Heard; L. Grooms; A. Prendatt; A. Constant; P. Harvey	Funkmaster Flex; JoJo Brim	4:06
10.	"Okay" (featuring Redman and Erick Sermon)	R. Noble; E. Sermon	Erick Sermon	2:54
11.	"Dem Want War" (featuring Raekwon)	A. Taylor; C. Woods; L. Porter	Funkmaster Flex; Ez Elpee	2:05
12.	"For My Thugs" (featuring Jay-Z, Memphis Bleek, Beanie Sigel and Amil)	S. Carter; D. Stinson; M. Cox; D. Grant; A. Whitehead	Rockwilder	4:31
13.	"Wow" (featuring Angie Martinez)	A. Martinez; A. Roberts	Jocko; Rahim	3:02
14.	"Respect" (featuring the Cash Money Millionaires)	D. Carter; T. Gray; C. Dorsey; B. Thomas	Mannie Fresh	3:59
15.	"Ill Bomb" (featuring LL Cool J)	J. Smith; G. Spivey; E. Wrubel	DJ Scratch	3:51
16.	"Def Jam 2000" (featuring Fatman Scoop)	A. Taylor; I. Freeman III; J. Rizzo; E. Bini; A. Moon; T. Thomas; E. Simmons; K. Dean; S. Carter; R. Walters; G. Mays; D. Barnes	DJ Riz; DJ Sizzhandz	2:40
17.	"Thuun" (featuring Capone-N-Noreaga)	A. Taylor; K. Holley; V. Santiago; E. Alexander	Funkmaster Flex; Ric Rude	5:23
18.	"Live at the Tunnel" (featuring the Murderers)	J. Atkins; R. Gill; T. Crocker L. Raynor; R. Mays; I. Lorenzo; S. McKenzie; W. Mitchell; K. McKenzie	Irv Gotti; Lil' Rob	3:31
19.	"Millennium Thug" (featuring Nas)	N. Jones; N. Jones; K. Carter; R. Grant; R. Grant; K. Khaleel; T. Embden	Big Kap; DJ Twinz^{[a]}	3:37
20.	"Dead Man Walking" (featuring Beanie Sigel and Dutch & Spade)	A. Walker; A. Burbage; D. Grant; D. Branch	Darrell "Digga" Branch	4:27
21.	"Bounce" (featuring Lady Luck and Jinx da Juvy)	S. Jones; D. Carr; R. Kirkland; S. Carter; I. Lorenzo; J. Atkins; R. Mays	Robert "Shim" Kirkland	3:13
Total length:				1:09:15

Notes

- ^{^[a]} signifies a co-producer.

Sample credits

- Track 1 contains a sample from "Bang Bang", written by Sonny Bono and performed by Vanilla Fudge
- Track 3 contains a sample from "My Song", written by Charles Richard Cason and performed by Al Wilson
- Track 5 contains samples from "Juicy Fruit", written and performed by James Mtume, "I'm Afraid the Masquerade is Over", written by Allie Wrubel and performed by David Porter, "Stay With Me", written and performed by DeBarge, "You Can't Turn Me Away", written by James Bedford, Sylvia Striplin and Roy Ayers and performed by Sylvia Striplin, "Do the James", written by Caliente Fredrick and Erik Rudnicki and performed by Super Lover Cee
- Track 8 contains samples from "You Know You Got Soul", written by Eric Barrier, Charles Bobbit, James Brown, Bobby Byrd and William Griffin, and performed by Eric B. & Rakim
- Track 9 contains excerpts from "Where My Homies", written by Lorenzo Grooms, Anthony Prendatt, Alphonse Constant, Patrick Harvey and performed by Ill Al Skratch
- Track 15 contains a sample from "I'm Afraid the Masquerade is Over", written by Allie Wrubel and performed by David Porter
- Track 16 contains samples from "Children's Story" and "Mona Lisa", written and performed by Slick Rick, "Seven Minutes of Funk", written by August Moon and Tyrone Thomas and performed by the Whole Darn Family, "Money, Cash, Hoes", written by Shawn Carter, Earl Simmons and Kasseem Dean and performed by Jay-Z, "Hip Hop Junkies", written and performed by Nice & Smooth
- Track 18 contains a sample from "Live at the Barbeque", written and performed by Main Source
- Track 19 contains a sample from "King of the Beats", written by Kurtis Mantronik and Touré Embden, and performed by Mantronix
- Track 21 contains a sample from "Can I Get A...", written by Shawn Carter, Jeffrey Atkins, Irving Lorenzo and Robin Mays, and performed by Jay-Z

== Charts ==
=== Weekly charts ===
Chart (1999)	Peak position
US Billboard 200	35
US Top R&B/Hip-Hop Albums (Billboard)	3

=== Year-end charts ===
Chart (2000)	Position
US Top R&B/Hip-Hop Albums (Billboard)	67

== Certifications ==
Region	Certification	Certified units/sales
United States (RIAA)	Gold	500,000^{^}
^{^} Shipments figures based on certification alone.
