= Head Banger (EPMD song) =

Single by EPMD featuring K-Solo and Redman

from the album Business Never Personal
- B-side: "Scratch Bring It Back"
- Released: October 29, 1992
- Recorded: 1992
- Genre: Hip hop
- Length: 4:51
- Label: Def Jam
- Songwriters: Erick Sermon, Parrish Smith
- Producer: EPMD

EPMD singles chronology
"Crossover" (1992)	"Head Banger" (1992)	"Da Joint" (1997)

Redman singles chronology
"Blow Your Mind" (1992)	"Head Banger" (1992)	"Time 4 Sum Aksion" (1993)

"Head Banger", also "Headbanger", is the second single released from EPMD's fourth album, Business Never Personal.

The song, which was produced by member Erick Sermon, featured verses from K-Solo and Redman, both members of EPMD's rap collective, the Hit Squad. The single became a minor hit on both the R&B and rap charts. peaking at 75 on the Hot R&B Singles chart and 11 on the Hot Rap Singles chart. The song used three samples, Parliament's "One Of Those Funky Thangs", Joe Tex's "Papa Was Too" and Brand Nubian's "Slow Down", and was later sampled itself by the Ruff Ryders on "Ryde or Die", which served as the opening song on their debut album, Ryde or Die Vol. 1. This was EPMD's final release before disbanding, eventually returning five years later in 1997.

== Single track listing ==
=== A-Side ===
1. "Head Banger" (LP Version)- 4:51
2. "Head Banger" (Radio Version)- 4:31

=== B-Side ===
1. "Head Banger" (Remix Radio Edit)- 4:57
2. "Scratch Bring It Back"- 3:04

== Charts ==
Chart (1992)	Peak position
US Billboard Hot R&B Singles	75
US Billboard Hot Rap Singles	11
