= Lady Luck (rapper) =

American rapper

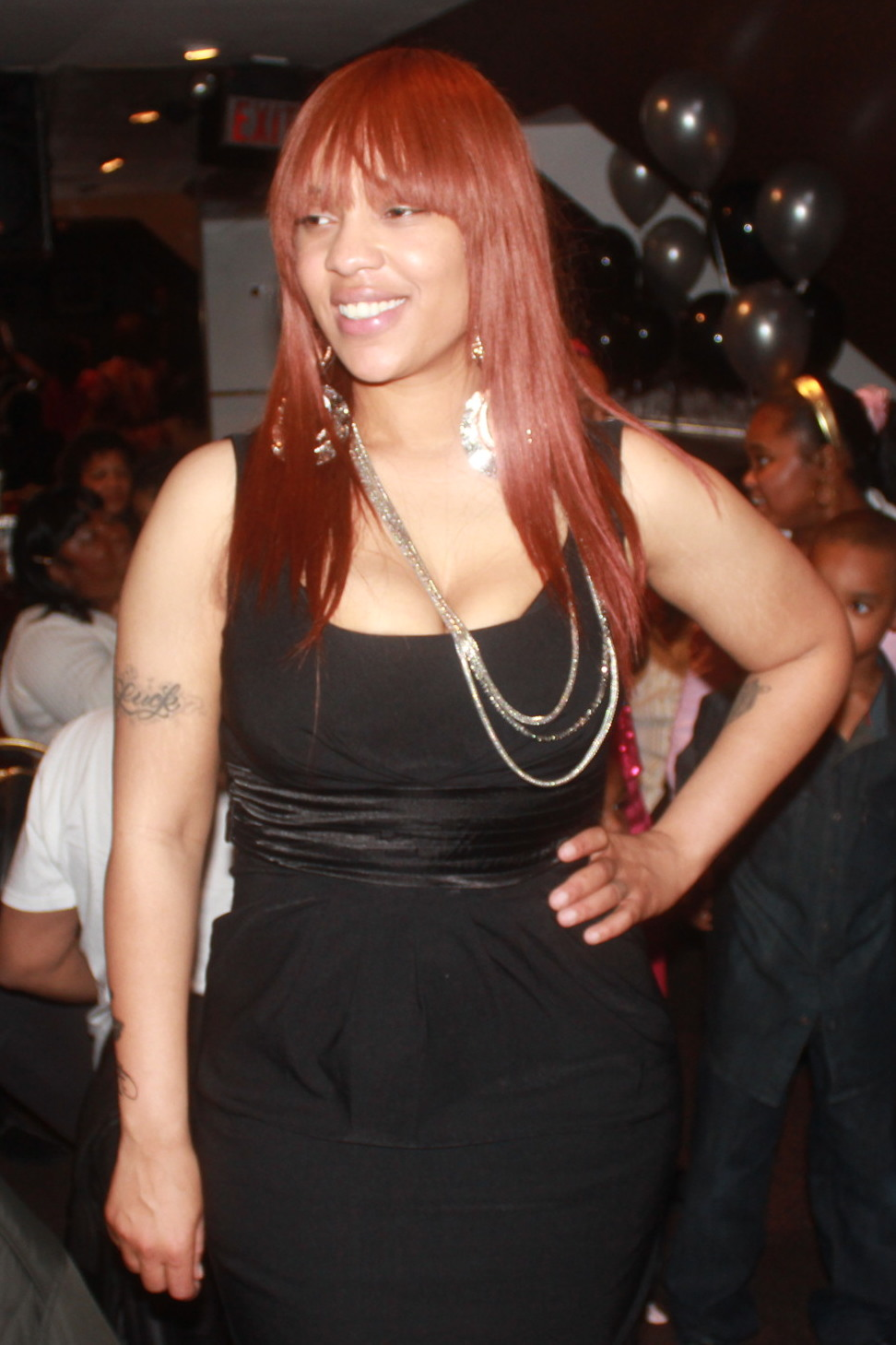
- Lady Luck in 2012

Background information
- Born: Shanell Ayana Jones; December 7, 1981 (age 44); Englewood, New Jersey, U.S.
- Genres: Hip hop
- Occupations: Rapper, songwriter
- Years active: 1999−present
- Labels: Universal, Def Jam, The Greatest Entertainment

Shanell Ayana Jones (born December 7, 1981), better known by her stage name Lady Luck, is an American rapper from Englewood, New Jersey. She signed a five-album record deal with Def Jam worth between half a million and a million dollars at the age of 17 on the strength of several freestyles that she did for New York radio station WQHT-FM. Luck was featured in The New Yorker and a series of articles in The Source, which ran monthly installments on her career. 2020 she became a music supervisor, winning an Emmy Award.

Luck was featured in the 2000 documentary film of Jay-Z's 1999 tour, Backstage. In 2017, she was a cast member on the reality show, First Family of Hip Hop on Bravo TV.Her single "STROKE" which was released on the television show went Platinum online. In 2023, she released "Praise."

She is of Puerto Rican and African American descent.

== Discography ==
=== Mixtapes ===
Title	Album details
The Facelift	Released: May 15, 2017; Label: Lady Luck; Format: Digital download
Are We There Yet	Released: June 7, 2011; Label: Self released; Format: Digital download

=== Singles ===
==== As featured artist ====
Title	Year	Peak chart positions		Album
Title	Year	US R&B	US Rap	Album
"Symphony 2000" (EPMD featuring Method Man, Redman and Lady Luck)	1999	62	28	Out of Business
"Simon Says (Remix)" (Pharoahe Monch featuring Busta Rhymes, Redman, Lady Luck and Shabaam Sahdeeq	1999	—	—	Internal Affairs
"—" denotes items which failed to chart.

== Filmography ==
=== Television ===
Year	Title	Role	Notes
2017	First Family of Hip Hop	Herself	
