= Give the People =

Single by EPMD

from the album Business as Usual
- B-side: "Manslaughter"
- Released: June 13, 1991
- Recorded: 1990–1991
- Genre: Hip hop
- Length: 3:30
- Label: Def Jam/RAL/Columbia (original release)
- Songwriters: Erick Sermon, Parrish Smith
- Producers: EPMD, DJ Scratch

EPMD singles chronology
"Rampage" (1991)	"Give the People" (1991)	"Crossover" (1992)

"Give the People" is the third and final single released from EPMD's third album, Business as Usual. It peaked at No. 28 on the Hot Rap Singles chart.

The song is built around a sample of the O'Jays' "Give the People What They Want".

== Music video ==
While there was no music video for the original version, there was a music video for the remix that was released in July 1991 weeks after the single was released. The "Give the People" video features EPMD rapping in front of a crowd at a park. Featured in this video are images and archive footage of Malcolm X, Jesse Jackson and scenes from other American racial injustice events. There are also several cameo appearances by rap artists such as Redman and Public Enemy.

== Track listing ==
1. "Give the People" (Erick & Parrish Remix) – 3:51
2. "Give The People" (Jeep Mix) – 5:02
3. "Give The People (Radio Version) – 3:30
4. "Manslaughter" (LP Version) – 4:36
