= Strictly Business (EPMD song) =

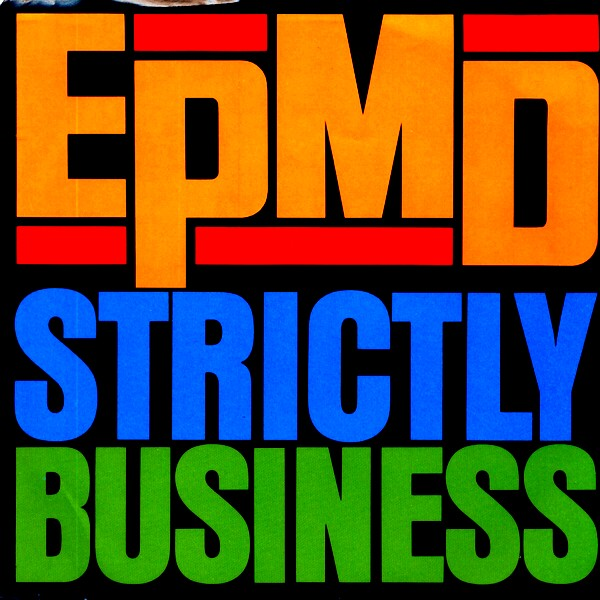

Single by EPMD

from the album Strictly Business
- Released: August 27, 1988
- Recorded: 1987
- Genre: Hip hop
- Length: 4:47
- Label: Fresh; Sleeping Bag
- Songwriter(s): Erick Sermon; Parrish Smith
- Producer(s): EPMD

EPMD singles chronology
"You Gots to Chill" (1988)	"Strictly Business" (1988)	"I'm Housin" (1989)

Music video
- "Strictly Business" on YouTube

"Strictly Business" is a song by EPMD from their debut album Strictly Business. Written and produced by the duo, "Strictly Business" became EPMD's second charting single, becoming a minor hit on the R&B charts. Although not a huge success when it was released, the song has since become a hip hop classic, making it onto several best hip hop songs lists.

== Single track listing ==
1. "Strictly Business" (Vocal Mix)- 6:30
2. "Strictly Business" (Radio Mix)- 3:30
3. "Strictly Business" (Instrumental Mix)- 5:26
4. "Strictly Business" (Acapella)- 4:01

== Charts ==
Chart (1988)	Position
U.S. R&B Singles	25
U.S. Hot Dance Music/Maxi-Singles Sales	17
U.S. Dance Music/Club Play Singles	19
