= You Gots to Chill =

Single by EPMD

from the album Strictly Business
- Released: April 30, 1988
- Recorded: 1988
- Genre: East Coast hip hop
- Length: 4:26
- Label: Fresh; Sleeping Bag
- Songwriters: Erick Sermon; Parrish Smith
- Producer: EPMD

EPMD singles chronology
"It's My Thing" (1987)	"You Gots to Chill" (1988)	"Strictly Business" (1988)

Music video
- "You Gots to Chill" on YouTube

"You Gots to Chill" is a song by EPMD, released as a single from their 1988 debut album Strictly Business. It reached number 22 on the U.S. R&B chart. The song prominently features a sample from "More Bounce to the Ounce" by Zapp and "Jungle Boogie" by Kool & the Gang. This song is widely considered a hip hop classic and has been paid homage by various rappers who have quoted the lyrics to this song in their own music, including Snoop Dogg and LL Cool J, among others. It was number 74 on VH1's 100 Greatest Hip Hop Songs.

== Music video ==
The official music video was directed by Adam Bernstein, who would also direct the video for "So Wat Cha Sayin'" a year later.
