= Gold Digger (EPMD song) =

Single by EPMD

from the album Business as Usual
- B-side: "Rap Is Outta Control"
- Released: November 14, 1990
- Recorded: 1990
- Genre: Hip hop
- Length: 4:57
- Label: Def Jam/RAL/Columbia
- Songwriters: Erick Sermon, Parrish Smith
- Producers: EPMD, Mr. Bozack

EPMD singles chronology
"So Wat Cha Sayin'" (1989)	"Gold Digger" (1990)	"Rampage" (1991)

"Gold Digger" is the lead single from EPMD's third album, Business as Usual. It was produced by EPMD with scratches provided by fellow group member DJ Scratch and was the duo's first of two singles to make it to #1 on the Hot Rap Singles.

== Single track listing ==
=== A-Side ===
1. "Gold Digger" (E & P Remix)- 4:15
2. "Gold Digger" (Vocal)- 5:11

=== B-Side ===
1. "Rap Is Outta Control" (Vocal)- 3:06
2. "Gold Digger" (Instrumental)- 5:11
3. "Gold Digger" (E & P Remix Instrumental)- 4:15

== Charts ==
Chart (1990–1991)	Peak position
US Hot R&B Singles	14
US Hot Rap Singles	1
US Hot Dance Music/Maxi-Singles Sales	24
