= Rampage (song) =

Single by EPMD featuring LL Cool J

from the album Business as Usual
- B-side: "I'm Mad"
- Released: March 25, 1991
- Recorded: 1990
- Genre: Hip hop
- Length: 4:57
- Label: Def Jam; RAL; Columbia
- Songwriter(s): Erick Sermon; Parrish Smith; James Todd Smith
- Producer(s): EPMD

EPMD singles chronology
"Gold Digger" (1990)	"Rampage" (1991)	"Give the People" (1991)

LL Cool J singles chronology
"Mama Said Knock You Out" (1991)	"Rampage" (1991)	"6 Minutes of Pleasure" (1991)

Music video
- "Rampage" on YouTube

"Rampage" (a.k.a. "Slow Down, Baby") is the second hit single released from EPMD's third album, Business as Usual. EPMD's new-found labelmate, LL Cool J contributed a verse on the song, while Pete Rock would provide the remix to the song. "Rampage" found its greatest success on the Rap charts, peaking at #2.

== Single track listing ==
1. "Rampage" (Remix Extended)- 4:35
2. "Rampage" (Hardcore to the Head Mix)- 4:41
3. "Rampage" (Remix Radio Edit)- 3:51
4. "Rampage" (Remix Instrumental)- 4:33
5. "Rampage" (Hardcore To The Head Mix Instrumental)- 4:37
6. "I'm Mad" (DJ Scratch Jazz Mix)- 3:46
7. "I'm Mad" (Red Man Mix)- 3:44
8. "I'm Mad" (LP Version)- 3:39
9. "Rampage" (LP Version)- 3:50

== Charts ==
Chart (1991)	Peak position
US Hot R&B Singles	30
US Hot Rap Singles	2
