= Da Joint =

Single by EPMD

from the album Back in Business
- B-side: "You Gots 2 Chill '97"
- Released: September 1997
- Recorded: 1997
- Studio: Mirror Image, Long Island
- Genre: Hip hop
- Length: 3:27
- Label: Def Jam
- Songwriter(s): Dana Stinson, Erick Sermon, James Brown, Parrish Smith
- Producer(s): Erick Sermon, Rockwilder

EPMD singles chronology
"Head Banger" (1992)	"Da Joint" (1997)	"Richter Scale" (1997)

"Da Joint" (sometimes spelt "The Joint") is the first single from EPMD's fifth album, Back in Business. Produced by Erick Sermon and Rockwilder, "Da Joint" became EPMD's second and final single to make it to the Billboard Hot 100, peaking at 94 on the chart with approximately 100,000 copies sold in the first week. "Da Joint" was released a week before the Back in Business album, making it to the first release by the newly reformed EPMD since the group's 1992 single, "Head Banger".

Hype Williams was planning to shoot the music video for "Da Joint", but those plans never materialized. Instead, Steve Carr directed the music video.

== Track listing ==
Side A

1. "Da Joint" (Radio Edit) – 3:26
2. "Da Joint" (LP Version) – 3:27

Side B

1. "Da Joint" (Instrumental) – 3:26
2. "You Gots 2 Chill '97" (Radio Edit) – 3:27

== Personnel ==
Credits are adapted from the single's liner notes.

- Erick Sermon – producer, writer
- Parrish Smith – producer, writer
- Tommy Uzzo – recording
- Ivan "Doc" Rodriguez – mixing
- Danny Clinch – photography

== Charts ==
Chart (1997)	Peak position
US Billboard Hot 100	94
US Hot R&B Singles (Billboard)	42
US Hot Rap Singles (Billboard)	17
US Hot Dance Music/Maxi-Singles Sales (Billboard)	5
