= We Mean Business (album) =

Studio album by EPMD
- Released: December 9, 2008
- Recorded: 2007–2008
- Genre: Hip hop
- Length: 41:41
- Label: EP; Fontana
- Producer: Erick Sermon (also exec.); Parrish Smith (also exec.); 9th Wonder; DJ Honda; JFK; Marc Berto; Tyrone Fyffe

EPMD chronology
Out of Business (1999)	We Mean Business (2008)	Big Business (TBA)

Singles from We Mean Business
- 1. "Blow" Released: 2007; 2. "Listen Up" Released: 2008

Professional ratings
Review scores
Source	Rating
AllHipHop	6.5/10 stars
AllMusic	3.5/5 stars
HipHopDX	4/5 stars
Okayplayer	74/100
Pitchfork Media	6.6/10
RapReviews	7/10
XXL	L (3/5)

We Mean Business is the seventh studio album released by rap duo, EPMD. It was released on December 9, 2008, through EP Records, making it the group's first album since 1999's Out of Business.

== Track listing ==
No.	Title	Producer(s)	Length
1.	"Puttin' Work In" (featuring Raekwon)	Ty Fyffe	2:28
2.	"What You Talkin'" (featuring Havoc)	Erick Sermon	3:54
3.	"Roc-Da-Spot"	Erick Sermon	3:33
4.	"Blow"	JFK; Erick Sermon	3:32
5.	"Run It" (featuring KRS-One)	Erick Sermon	3:35
6.	"Yo" (featuring Redman)	Marc Berto	3:32
7.	"Listen Up" (featuring Teddy Riley)	Erick Sermon	3:32
8.	"Bac Stabbers"	EPMD	3:06
9.	"Never Defeat 'Em" (featuring Method Man)	DJ Honda	3:38
10.	"Jane"	Parrish Smith	1:57
11.	"Left 4 Dead" (featuring Skyzoo)	9th Wonder	3:12
12.	"They Tell Me" (featuring Keith Murray)	Parrish Smith	2:48
13.	"Actin' Up" (featuring Vic D and Tre)	Erick Sermon	3:02

== Charts ==
Chart (2008)	Peak position
US Top R&B/Hip-Hop Albums (Billboard)	42
US Top Rap Albums (Billboard)	13
