= Business as Usual (EPMD album) =

Studio album by EPMD
- Released: December 18, 1990
- Genre: East Coast hip-hop
- Length: 51:18
- Label: Def Jam; Rush; Columbia
- Producer: EPMD; DJ Scratch

EPMD chronology
| Unfinished Business (1989) | Business as Usual (1990) | Business Never Personal (1992) |

Singles from Business as Usual
- 1. "Gold Digger" Released: November 14, 1990; 2. "Rampage" Released: February 26, 1991; 3. "Give the People" Released: June 13, 1991

Professional ratings
Review scores
| Source | Rating |
|---|---|
| AllMusic | 3/5 stars |
| Entertainment Weekly | A |
| Los Angeles Times | 3/4 stars |
| RapReviews | 10/10 |
| The New Rolling Stone Album Guide | 4/5 stars |
| The Village Voice | C+ |

Business as Usual is the third album by hip hop duo EPMD. It was released on December 18, 1990, and was their first album on Def Jam, after being signed (along with Nice & Smooth) from their former label, Fresh Records. It was also the first release under Def Jam's new Rush subsidiary, which allowed founder Russell Simmons more control and more ownership over its material, as the masters for proper Def Jam releases at that time were primarily owned by Sony Music's Columbia Records.

Business as Usual was not as acclaimed as the group's first two albums. The album featured the debut of future hip hop star Redman, who appears on the tracks "Hardcore" and "Brothers on My Jock." Three singles were released from the album: "Gold Digger," "Rampage (Slow Down, Baby)," featuring LL Cool J, and "Give the People." In 1998, the album was selected as one of The Source's 100 Best Rap Albums.

Its front cover features art from famed American artist Bill Sienkiewicz.

The album was certified Gold by the RIAA on May 7, 1991.

== Critical reception ==
The Los Angeles Times wrote that "EPMD could be the most underrated group in hip-hop, pumping direct, honest, simple B-boy rhymes over slow, deadly, bass-heavy beats, pretty much defining the New York rap sound."

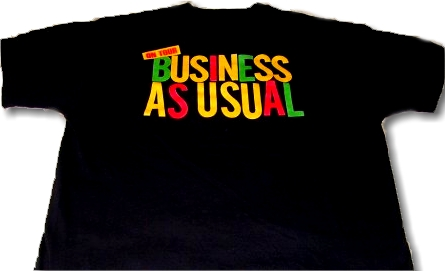
Promotional t-shirt for the group's Business as Usual album

== Track listing ==
| # | Title | Performer (s) | Length |
|---|---|---|---|
| 1 | "I'm Mad" | EPMD | 3:41 |
| 2 | "Hardcore" | EPMD, Redman | 4:31 |
| 3 | "Rampage" | EPMD, LL Cool J | 3:51 |
| 4 | "Manslaughter" | EPMD | 4:38 |
| 5 | "Jane 3" | EPMD | 2:36 |
| 6 | "For My People" | EPMD | 3:03 |
| 7 | "Mr. Bozack" | EPMD | 2:45 |
| 8 | "Gold Digger" | EPMD | 5:11 |
| 9 | "Give the People" | EPMD | 3:36 |
| 10 | "Rap Is Outta Control" | EPMD | 3:09 |
| 11 | "Brothers on My Jock" | EPMD, Redman | 4:07 |
| 12 | "Underground" | EPMD | 3:30 |
| 13 | "Hit Squad Heist" | EPMD | 3:34 |
| 14 | "Funky Piano" | EPMD | 4:26 |

== Charts ==
| Year | Album | Chart positions | |
| Year | Album | Billboard 200 | Top R&B/Hip Hop Albums |
| 1990 | Business as Usual | 36 | 1 |

== Certifications ==
| Region | Certification | Certified units/sales |
|---|---|---|
| United States (RIAA) | Gold | 500,000^{^} |
^{^} Shipments figures based on certification alone.

== See also ==
- List of number-one R&B albums of 1991 (U.S.)
