= Back in Business (EPMD album) =

Studio album by EPMD
- Released: September 16, 1997
- Studio: Mirror Image (Long Island, NY); Soundtrack (New York, NY)
- Genre: Hip hop
- Length: 46:08
- Label: Def Jam
- Producer: EPMD (also exec.); DJ Scratch; Agallah (co.); Rockwilder (co.)

EPMD chronology
Business Never Personal (1992)	Back in Business (1997)	Out of Business (1999)

Singles from Back in Business
- 1. "Never Seen Before" Released: July 1997; 2. "Da Joint" Released: September 1997; 3. "Richter Scale" Released: November 1997

Professional ratings
Review scores
Source	Rating
AllMusic	3/5 stars
Chicago Tribune	1.5/4 stars
The Encyclopedia of Popular Music	2/5 stars
The Guardian	4/5 stars
The New Rolling Stone Album Guide	2.5/5 stars
RapReviews	7/10
Rolling Stone	2.5/5 stars
The Source	4/5 stars

Back in Business is the fifth studio album by American hip hop duo EPMD. It was released on September 16, 1997, through Def Jam Recordings. The recording sessions took place at Mirror Image and Soundtrack Studios in New York. The album was produced by members Erick Sermon and PMD, as well as DJ Scratch, with Agallah and Rockwilder serving as co-producers. It features guest appearances from Das EFX, Keith Murray, Nocturnal, and Redman.

In the United States, the album peaked at number 16 on the Billboard 200 and number 4 on the Top R&B/Hip-Hop Albums. It was certified Gold by the Recording Industry Association of America on November 17, 1997, for selling 500,000 copies. It also reached number 100 on the UK Albums Chart and number 14 on the UK Hip Hop and R&B Albums Chart.

The song "Never Seen Before" was released as a split single with Foxy Brown's "Big Bad Mamma" from Def Jam's How to Be a Player soundtrack. "Da Joint" made it to number 94 on the Billboard Hot 100 and became the duo's second most successful single (after "Crossover") in the album era. The final single off of the album, "Richter Scale", only reached number 62 on the Hot R&B/Hip-Hop Songs.

The album marks the reunion of the group after five year disbandment, when the pair had broken up due to financial issues.

== Critical reception ==
Vibe wrote that "Sermon's sluggish production makes the duo's paper-thin and finance-driven subject matter that much more irritating". Rolling Stone declared: "Gone is the Wall of Sound funk that made EPMD famous". The Austin American-Statesman thought that "jams such as 'Richter Scale' and 'Get With This' show true EPMD style as Erick and Parish sound perfect together over guitar funk". The Guardian wrote that Back in Business "returns to the breaks and beats that made [EPMD] great: kooky 1970s funk samples mixed with guitar loops and cool-as-ice vocals".

== Track listing ==
No.	Title	Writer(s)	Producer(s)	Length
1.	"Intro"	Erick Sermon	Erick Sermon	0:13
2.	"Richter Scale"	Sermon; Parrish Smith; James Stuart; Alan Gorrie; Owen McIntyre; Robbie McIntosh; Malcolm Duncan; Roger Ball; Robert Bell; Ronald Bell; Donald Boyce; George Brown; Robert Mickens; Claydes Charles Smith; Dennis Thomas; Richard Westfield	Erick Sermon	3:14
3.	"Da Joint"	Sermon; P. Smith; Dana Stinson; James Brown; Adam Yauch; Michael Diamond; John King; Mike Simpson; Matt Dike	Erick Sermon; Rockwilder (co.)	3:28
4.	"Never Seen Before"	Sermon; P. Smith; Art Neville; Leo Nocentelli; Joseph Modeliste; George Porter Jr.; Carlton Ridenhour; James Henry Boxley III	Erick Sermon	2:51
5.	"Skit"	P. Smith; Andre Weston; William Hines	PMD	0:24
6.	"Intrigued" (featuring Das EFX)	Sermon; P. Smith; Weston; Hines	Erick Sermon	3:37
7.	"Last Man Standing"	Sermon; P. Smith; Willie Seastrunk; Barrence Eugene Carter; Albert Johnson; Kejuan Muchita	PMD; Erick Sermon (co.)	3:35
8.	"Get wit This"	Sermon; P. Smith; Billy Squier	Erick Sermon	3:42
9.	"Do It Again"	Sermon; P. Smith; Tom Browne; Thomassina Carrollyne Smith	Erick Sermon	2:50
10.	"Apollo Interlude"	Sermon; Darryl Trotter	Erick Sermon	1:19
11.	"You Gots 2 Chill '97"	Sermon; P. Smith; Roger Troutman; Rob Bell; Ron Bell; Boyce; G. Brown; Mickens; C. Smith; Thomas; Westfield	EPMD	3:26
12.	"Put On"	Sermon; P. Smith; George Spivey	DJ Scratch	3:54
13.	"K.I.M." (featuring Keith Murray and Redman)	Sermon; P. Smith; Keith Murray; Reginald Noble; Fred Scruggs; Kirk Jones; Marlon Fletcher; Tyrone Taylor; Chylow Parker	Erick Sermon	4:38
14.	"Dungeon Master" (featuring Nocturnal)	Sermon; P. Smith; Yasin Muhammedi	PMD; Agallah (co.)	3:24
15.	"Jane 5"	P. Smith; Rick James	PMD	2:41
16.	"Never Seen Before" (Remix)	Sermon; P. Smith; Mark Adams; Steve Arrington; Ray Turner; Stephen C. Washington; Danny Webster	Erick Sermon	2:52
Total length:				46:08

Sample credits

- Track 2 contains samples from "Person to Person" as recorded by Average White Band and a sample from "Jungle Boogie" by Kool & the Gang.
- Track 3 contains a sample from "Think (About It)" performed by Lyn Collins and excerpts from "Shake Your Rump" performed by Beastie Boys.
- Track 4 contains an interpolation of "Just Kissed My Baby" by the Meters and a sample from "Public Enemy #1" as recorded by Public Enemy.
- Track 7 contains a sample from "Midnight Groove" by Barry White and a sample from "Front Lines (Hell on Earth)" performed by Mobb Deep.
- Track 8 contains excerpts from "Big Beat" written and performed by Billy Squier.
- Track 9 contains a sample from "Funkin' for Jamaica (N.Y.)" performed by Tom Browne.
- Track 11 contains a sample from "More Bounce to the Ounce" as recorded by Zapp and a sample from "Jungle Boogie".
- Track 13 contains a sample of "Da Mad Face Invasion" performed by Onyx and a sample of "(You Gotta) Fight for Your Right (To Party!)" by Beastie Boys.
- Track 15 contains a sample from "Mary Jane" written and performed by Rick James.
- Track 16 contains a sample of "Watching You" performed by Slave.

== Personnel ==
- Erick Sermon – vocals, producer (tracks: 1–4, 6, 8–11, 13, 16), co-producer (track 7), executive producer, sleeve notes
- Parrish "PMD" Smith – vocals, producer (tracks: 5, 7, 11, 14, 15), executive producer, sleeve notes
- Andre "Krazy Drayz" Weston – additional vocals (track 5), vocals (track 6)
- Willie "Skoob" Hines – additional vocals (track 5), vocals (track 6)
- Yasin "Nocturnal" Muhammedi – additional vocals (track 5), vocals (track 14)
- Darryl "Pop" Trotter – additional vocals (track 10)
- Keith Murray – vocals (track 13)
- Reggie "Redman" Noble – vocals (track 13)
- George "DJ Scratch" Spivey – scratches, producer (track 12)
- Dana "Rockwilder" Stinson – co-producer (track 3)
- Angel "8-Off" Aguilar – co-producer (track 14)
- Ivan 'Doc' Rodriguez – recording (tracks: 1, 5, 10, 13–15), mixing (tracks: 1–3, 5–10, 12, 13, 15)
- Tommy Uzzo – recording (tracks: 2–4, 11, 16), mixing (tracks: 4, 11, 16)
- Tom Chianti – recording (tracks: 6–9)
- Mikael Ifversen – recording (track: 12)
- Chris Irish – mixing (track 14)
- Dave Butcher – engineering assistant
- Marc Berto – engineering assistant
- Mike Koch – engineering assistant
- Tony Dawsey – mastering
- Bernard Alexander – co-executive producer, management
- Danny Clinch – photography
- Kevin Liles – A&R
- Irving "Irv Gotti" Lorenzo Jr. – A&R
- The Drawing Board – creative director

== Charts ==
=== Weekly charts ===
Chart (1997)	Peak position
UK Albums (OCC)	100
UK R&B Albums (OCC)	14
US Billboard 200	16
US Top R&B/Hip-Hop Albums (Billboard)	4

=== Year-end charts ===
Chart (1997)	Position
US Top R&B/Hip-Hop Albums (Billboard)	72

== Certifications ==
Region	Certification	Certified units/sales
United States (RIAA)	Gold	500,000^{^}
^{^} Shipments figures based on certification alone.
