= Crossover (song) =

1992 single by EPMD

Single by EPMD

from the album Business Never Personal
- B-side: "Brothers from Brentwood L.I."
- Released: June 23, 1992
- Recorded: 1992
- Genre: Hip hop
- Length: 3:50
- Label: Def Jam; Columbia
- Songwriters: Erick Sermon, Parrish Smith
- Producer: EPMD

EPMD singles chronology
"Give the People" (1991)	"Crossover" (1992)	"Head Banger" (1992)

Music video
- "Crossover" on YouTube

"Crossover" is a single by American hip hop group EPMD released in August 1992 from their fourth album, Business Never Personal (1992). The song's lyrics criticize rappers who crossover to R&B or pop in order to sell more. The single became EPMD's highest charting as it climbed the US Cash Box Top 100 at #28 and US Billboard Hot 100 at #42. The song was also certified gold by RIAA, becoming the group's only single to accomplish that feat. The song samples "Don't Worry If There's a Hell Below (We're All Gonna Go)" by Curtis Mayfield and Roger Troutman's "You Should Be Mine". A music video, colored in blue, was released for the song which features Erick Sermon and Parrish Smith rapping around a building under construction with other people around doing various activities like break-dancing.

== Track listing ==
1. Crossover – 3:50
2. Crossover (Instrumental) – 3:49
3. Crossover (Trunk Mix) – 4:15
4. Crossover (Trunk Mix Instrumental) – 4:15
5. Brothers From Brentwood L.I. – 3:30

== Charts ==
Chart (1992–1993)	Peak position
US Billboard Hot 100	42
US Hot Dance Music/Maxi-Singles Sales (Billboard)	12
US Hot R&B/Hip-Hop Songs (Billboard)	14
US Hot Rap Songs (Billboard)	1
US Cash Box Top 100	28

== Certifications ==
Region	Certification	Certified units/sales
United States (RIAA)	Gold	500,000^{^}
^{^} Shipments figures based on certification alone.
