= DJ Scratch =

American record producer (born 1968)

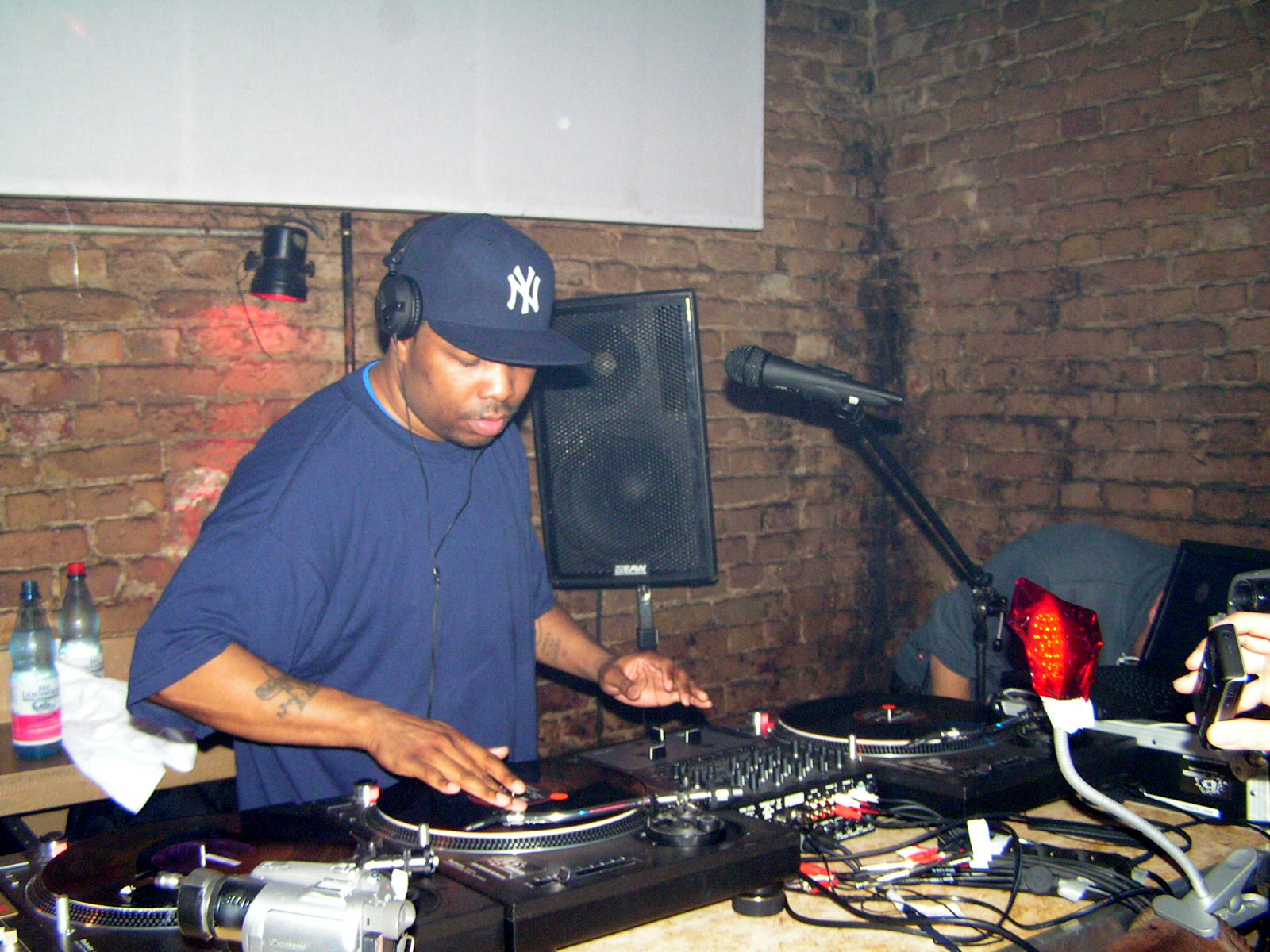
- DJ Scratch in 2008

Background information
- Also known as: Jam Master DJ Scratch
- Born: George Spivey; June 21, 1968 (age 58); Brooklyn, New York City, U.S.
- Genre: Hip-hop
- Occupations: Record producer; disc jockey
- Years active: 1985–present
- Label: B.U.D.A. Productions Inc.
- Formerly of: EPMD; Flipmode Squad
- Website: scratchvision.com

George Spivey (born June 21, 1968), known professionally as DJ Scratch, is an American record producer from Brooklyn, New York.

DJ Scratch is the 1988 New Music Seminar Battle For World Supremacy DJ champion, the 2010 Master of the Mix winner and the 2012, 2013 & 2014 Global Spin Awards' "Turntablist of the Year". 19 albums produced by DJ Scratch were certified Gold in United States, seven of them were certified as Platinum.

== Career ==
DJ Scratch was introduced to EPMD by Jam Master Jay at the Run's House Tour after DJ K LA Boss left EPMD. Impressed by his skills, the two designated DJ Scratch as their official DJ by their second album Unfinished Business in 1989. His presence was felt with his powerful cutting and scratching techniques that are heard on various tracks. Aside from scratching, on Business As Usual, he produced the track "Funky Piano", "Rampage" and in 1991 worked on a remix for "I'm Mad" off the "Rampage" 12" single.

In 1992, Scratch produced "Scratch Bring It Back, Pt. 2 (Mic Doc)" and briefly worked with his cousin DJ Magic Mike after EPMD broke up. Soon Scratch made a name for himself as a producer for Busta Rhymes and the Flipmode Squad off Busta's debut album in 1996. By 2003 DJ Scratch became a well distinguished and revered hip-hop producer after working with 50 Cent, LL Cool J, Talib Kweli, Pharoahe Monch, DMX, The Roots, Q-Tip and other notable acts.

Scratch was the resident DJ for three nationally aired TV Shows: Hip Hop Hold Em', Fox 5's Uptown Comedy Club and B.E.T.'s Rap City: The Basement. Scratch's film credits include Juice, The Original 50 Cent, Backstage, Fly By Night, Rhyme & Reason and Spike Lee's film Bamboozled. In addition, Coca-Cola commissioned Scratch to produce & feature in their first DJ commercial, "3 DJs".

According to PMD of EPMD, DJ Scratch left the group in 2015. Scratch posted on his Instagram page words of resentment towards former participants on January 2, 2017.

In 2016, DJ Scratch helped fill in for A Tribe Called Quest's DJ Ali Shaheed Muhammad on their final album We Got It from Here... Thank You 4 Your Service due to Ali producing the soundtrack for the Luke Cage TV series with Adrian Younge at the time.

As of 2022, Scratch hosts The DJ Scratch Show on LL Cool J’s Rock The Bells Radio, which is a station on SiriusXM. It is a mix show that features the DJ curating a selection of classic hip-hop.

Scratch calls Grandmaster Flash his mentor.

== Awards and nominations ==
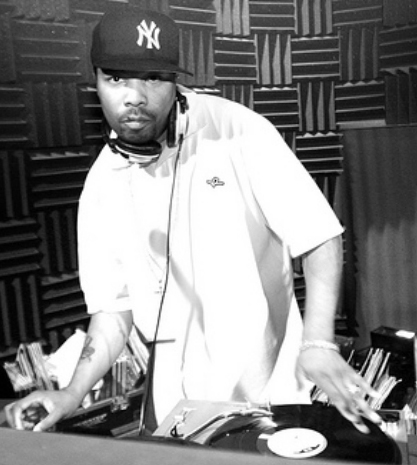
DJ Scratch in 2005

- 1988 — New Music Seminar Battle For World Supremacy DJ champion
- 2010 — Master of the Mix winner
- 2012, 2013 & 2014 — Global Spin Awards' "Turntablist Of The Year"

DJ Scratch-produced works nominated for a Grammy award

- Busta Rhymes — song "Gimme Some More" (1998) ("Best Rap Solo Performance")
- Busta Rhymes — album E.L.E. (Extinction Level Event): The Final World Front (1998) ("Best Rap Album")
- The Roots — album Phrenology (2002) ("Best Rap Album")

Albums, produced by DJ Scratch, which were certified Gold in United States

- EPMD — Unfinished Business (1989)
- EPMD — Business as Usual (1990)
- EPMD — Business Never Personal (1992)
- EPMD — Back in Business (1997)
- Flipmode Squad — The Imperial (1998)
- Q-Tip — Amplified (1999)
- Funkmaster Flex & Big Kap — The Tunnel (1999)
- LL Cool J — G.O.A.T. (2000)
- Busta Rhymes — It Ain't Safe No More... (2002)
- The Roots — Phrenology (2002)
- Talib Kweli — Quality (2002)

Albums, produced by DJ Scratch, which were certified Platinum in United States

- Busta Rhymes — The Coming (1996)
- Busta Rhymes — When Disaster Strikes (1997)
- Busta Rhymes — E.L.E. (Extinction Level Event): The Final World Front (1998)
- DJ Clue — The Professional (1998)
- Method Man & Redman — Blackout! (1999)
- Busta Rhymes — Anarchy (2000)
- DMX — Grand Champ (2003)

== Discography ==
First	Master of the Mix winner 2010	Succeeded by DJ P
