= Business Never Personal =

Studio album by EPMD
- Released: July 28, 1992
- Recorded: 1991–1992
- Genre: East Coast hip-hop
- Length: 38:58
- Label: Def Jam; Columbia
- Producer: EPMD; Charlie Marotta; DJ Scratch; Mr. Bozack

EPMD chronology
Business as Usual (1990)	Business Never Personal (1992)	Back in Business (1997)

Singles from Business Never Personal
- 1. "Crossover" Released: June 23, 1992; 2. "Head Banger" Released: October 29, 1992

Business Never Personal is the fourth studio album by hip-hop duo EPMD. It was released on July 28, 1992, on Def Jam Recordings. Following mixed criticism of their previous studio effort, 1990's Business as Usual, the duo was able to return to their past acclaim on Business Never Personal. The lead single, "Crossover," became its biggest success, nearly reaching the Top 40 on the Billboard Hot 100. The song is about keeping it real and not crossing over to the mainstream, but became EPMD's biggest mainstream success.

The duo cut "Head Banger" with Redman and K-Solo, and it was also a hit in 1992. The album was certified Gold in sales by the RIAA on October 13, 1992. The single "Crossover" was certified Gold on November 16, 1992. While it has yet to be reissued in the U.S., Business Never Personal was re-released in 2005 on vinyl in Europe.

Members Erick Sermon and Parrish Smith began having money troubles during recording, which led to a 1992 robbery of Smith's home. The perpetrators claimed that Erick Sermon paid them to do the deed, causing the group to break up soon after this release. They each released two solo albums between 1993 and 1996, then reunited as a duo in 1997.

== Critical reception ==
Professional ratings
Review scores
Source	Rating
AllMusic	4.5/5 stars
Robert Christgau	(dud)
Entertainment Weekly	B+
Rolling Stone	3/5 stars
The New Rolling Stone Album Guide	3.5/5 stars
The Source	4.5/5

The album is considered the duo's third classic by fans and critics. The record was given a rating of 4.5 mics out of 5 in The Source in 1992.

The Washington Post wrote: "Zapp member Roger Troutman's sampled, synthesized voice is looped with the chorus of the bumping current hit 'Crossover,' EPMD's attack on rappers who 'sell their souls to go gold' while slinking bass propels 'Play the Next Man,' which finds Sermon and Smith slamming manipulative women."

== Track listing ==
#	Title	Producer(s)	Performer (s)	Length
1	"Boon Dox"	EPMD	EPMD	2:48
2	"Nobody's Safe Chump"	EPMD	EPMD	2:12
3	"Can't Hear Nothing but the Music"	EPMD, Charlie Marotta	EPMD	3:37
4	"Chill"	EPMD	EPMD	2:57
5	"Head Banger"	EPMD	EPMD, K-Solo, Redman	4:52
6	"Scratch Bring It Back, Pt. 2 [Mic Doc]"	DJ Scratch, Mr. Bozack	EPMD	3:04
7	"Crossover"	EPMD	EPMD	3:49
8	"Cummin' at Cha"	EPMD	EPMD, Das EFX	4:03
9	"Play the Next Man"	EPMD	EPMD	3:36
10	"It's Going Down"	EPMD	EPMD	4:12
11	"Who Killed Jane?"	EPMD	EPMD	3:47

== Samples ==
Boon Dox

- "I Can Feel It in My Bones" by Earth, Wind & Fire
- "The Assembly Line" by Commodores
- "Slow Down" by Brand Nubian
- "If It Don't Turn You on (You Oughta Leave It Alone)" by B.T. Express
- "The Payback" by James Brown

Nobody's Safe Chump

- "Nobody Wants You When You're Down and Out" by Bobby Womack
- "Wah Wah Man" by Young-Holt Unlimited
- "The Message" by Grandmaster Flash and the Furious Five
- "The New Style" by Beastie Boys

Can't Hear Nothing but the Music

- "Give Me Your Love" by Barbara Mason
- "It's a New Day" by Skull Snaps
- "School Boy Crush" by Average White Band
- "Jungle Boogie" by Kool and the Gang

Chill

- "Street Thunder" by Foreigner
- "Atomic Dog" by George Clinton
- "UFO" by ESG
- "It's Funky Enough" by the D.O.C.
- "My Melody" by Eric B. & Rakim

Head Banger

- "Impeach the President" by the Honey Drippers
- "Papa Was Too" by Joe Tex
- "One of Those Funky Things" by Parliament
- "Slow Down" by Brand Nubian
- "Surprises" by the Last Poets

Scratch Bring It Back, Pt. 2 [Mic Doc]

- "Duck Down" by Boogie Down Productions
- "I Like It" by the Emotions
- "Scenario" by A Tribe Called Quest
- "Synthetic Substitution" by Melvin Bliss
- "UFO" by ESG
- "Rampage" and "I'm Mad" by EPMD

Crossover

- "You Should Be Mine" by Roger
- "Say What" by Idris Muhammad
- "Bring the Noise" by Public Enemy

Cummin' at Cha

- "Straight Outta Compton" by N.W.A
- "Smokin Cheeba-Cheeba" by Harlem Underground Band
- "How I Could Just Kill a Man" by Cypress Hill
- "25 ta Life" by D-Nice
- "Teddy's Jam" by Guy
- "They Want EFX" by Das EFX
- "Breath Control II" by Boogie Down Productions
- "Underground" by EPMD
- "Hot Pants" by James Brown

Play the Next Man

- "Sir Nose D'Voidoffunk [Pay Attention - B3M]" by Parliament
- "Raw" by Big Daddy Kane
- "Can't Truss It" by Public Enemy
- "Jingling Baby" by LL Cool J

It's Going Down

- "Paul Revere" by Beastie Boys
- "I Want You" by Marvin Gaye
- "You’re Getting a Little Too Smart" by the Detroit Emeralds
- "Long Red" by Mountain
- "The Big Beat" by Billy Squier

Who Killed Jane?

- "Stone Junkie" by Curtis Mayfield
- "Mary Jane" by Rick James
- "Papa Was Too" by Joe Tex

== Charts ==
=== Weekly charts ===
Chart (1992)	Peak position
US Billboard 200	14
US Top R&B/Hip-Hop Albums (Billboard)	5

=== Year-end charts ===
Chart (1992)	Position
US Top R&B/Hip-Hop Albums (Billboard)	44

== Singles Chart Positions ==
Year	Song	Chart positions			
Year	Song	Billboard Hot 100	Hot R&B/Hip-Hop Singles & Tracks	Hot Rap Singles	Hot Dance Music/Maxi-Singles Sales
1992	"Crossover"	42	14	1	12
1992	"Head Banger"	-	75	11	-

== Certifications ==
Region	Certification	Certified units/sales
United States (RIAA)	Gold	500,000^{^}
^{^} Shipments figures based on certification alone.
