= Fresh Records (US) =

American record label

- Parent company: Sleeping Bag Records
- Founded: 1985
- Founder: William Socolov
- Defunct: 1992
- Genre: Hip-hop, house, electro
- Country of origin: U.S.
- Location: New York City

Fresh Records was a New York City-based independent record label that operated from 1985 to 1992. The label was a subsidiary of Sleeping Bag Records that sold hip hop music. The label's roster included EPMD, Nice & Smooth, Just-Ice and T La Rock; house-music pioneer Todd Terry; and electro artists Hanson & Davis and Chocolette.

Kurtis Mantronik, in addition to being the musician of the hip-hop duo Mantronix (signed to the parent label Sleeping Bag Records), did A&R for both labels.

EPMD rhymed about its record-signing experience with the label in the song "Please Listen to My Demo", from the 1989 album Unfinished Business ("Signed on the dotted line, now we Fresh Records members.").

== Founder ==
Fresh Records was founded by William Socolov in 1985, one of the three original founders of Sleeping Bag Records.

== Re-releases ==
After closing its doors (along with its parent label) in 1992, the catalog sat in limbo for several years. In 1996, the label and its catalog were purchased by Warlock Records, which has been re-releasing its titles with the Fresh and Sleeping Bag Records logos alongside the Warlock Records logo since. The building that housed Fresh and Sleeping Bag Records in Manhattan (1974 Broadway, NY, NY 10023) was torn down in the 1990s and a luxury apartment building now stands in its place. In 2006, the label became one of many imprints’ catalogs that became Traffic Entertainment Group, which has been releasing new versions of the classic albums in Fresh's catalog with their original artwork intact. However, the rights of the EPMD albums Strictly Business and Unfinished Business, and Nice & Smooth’s self-titled album were acquired by Priority/EMI Records shortly after Sleeping Bag ceased operations.

== See also ==
- List of record labels
