= Strictly Business (EPMD album) =

Studio album by EPMD
- Released: June 7, 1988
- Studio: North Shore Soundworks, Island Media (West Babylon, New York)
- Genre: East Coast hip-hop
- Length: 45:22
- Label: Fresh; Sleeping Bag
- Producer: EPMD

EPMD chronology
Strictly Business (1988)	Unfinished Business (1989)

Singles from Strictly Business
- 1. "It's My Thing" Released: 1987; 2. "You Gots to Chill" Released: April 30, 1988; 3. "Strictly Business" Released: September 10, 1988; 4. "I'm Housin" Released: 1989

Strictly Business is the debut album by the hip-hop duo EPMD. It was released on June 7, 1988, by Fresh/Sleeping Bag Records around the world and BCM Records in Germany. It peaked at No. 80 on the Billboard 200 soon after release, yet it earned an RIAA gold album certification within four months of its release. It has received much positive critical attention since its release. In 2012, the album was ranked number 453 on Rolling Stone's list of the 500 greatest albums of all time.

The album is known for its lighthearted party raps and funky sample-reliant production. The album has no guest emcees or producers except DJ K La Boss. The album is broken down track-by-track by the group in Brian Coleman's book Check the Technique.

== Reception ==
Professional ratings
Review scores
Source	Rating
AllMusic	5/5 stars
Los Angeles Times	3.5/4 stars
Mojo	5/5 stars
NME	9/10
The Philadelphia Inquirer	3/4 stars
Record Mirror	4/5
The Rolling Stone Album Guide	5/5 stars
The Source	5/5 stars
Spin Alternative Record Guide	9/10
The Village Voice	A−

=== Initial ===
Strictly Business peaked at No. 80 on the Billboard 200 and No. 1 on the Top R&B/Hip Hop Albums chart. Of its four singles, three landed on the UK Singles Chart and two reached the US Hot R&B/Hip-Hop Songs chart. Although none of the singles reached the Billboard Hot 100, the album was able to go gold within four months of its release. The Washington Post wrote that the album "does have an intriguing edge to it, but its beats are rigid and its raps—especially 'Jane', EPMD's entry in the genre's tiresome 'Boy, am I a stud!' sweepstakes—are often predictable." The Orange County Register called it "a masterful, minimalist mix of rhythms". Strictly Business was featured on various 1988 best-of lists. The Face ranked it as the third best album of the year, and ranked its title track as the 25th best single of the year. Sounds judged it to be the 50th best album of the year, while Spex ranked it as the 8th best.

=== Retrospect ===
Strictly Business has continued to attract critical success. AllMusic called the album "simply amazing". The Source assigned the album a five-mic rating, making it one of 43 albums to ever receive this rating. In 1994, Pop selected it a complement to Eric B. & Rakim's Paid in Full on its list of The World's 100 Best Albums + 300 Complements. In 1998, The Source placed Strictly Business on its 100 Best Rap Albums list and included two of its singles on its 100 Best Rap Singles list. In 1999, it was judged to be the 4th-best hip-hop album of 1988 by Ego Trip. In 2001, Dance de Lux ranked Strictly Business as the 11th-best hip-hop record of all time. In 2003, the album was placed on Blender's 500 CDs You Must Own Before You Die list and ranked number 459 on Rolling Stone magazine's list of the 500 greatest albums of all time, and was moved up to 453 in a 2012 revised list. Additionally, The Rolling Stone Album Guide, which initially rated the album as three and a half stars out of five, awarded the album with a five-star rating in 2004. Retrospective reviews by Spin (1995), The Encyclopedia of Popular Music (2002), and Sputnikmusic (2006) have respectively allotted the album a nine-out-of-10 rating, a four-star rating, and a seven-out-of-10 rating. Strictly Business is now widely considered to be a classic release and a seminal hip-hop album.

== Legacy ==
The Mario Winans, Enya, and P. Diddy song "I Don't Wanna Know" (2004) and its Metro Boomin, The Weeknd, and 21 Savage remake "Creepin'" (2022) both heavily incorporate the drum outro of the album track "You're a Customer" from Strictly Business. Another Diddy/Winans collaboration, "Through the Pain (She Told Me)" (2007), while not sampling it directly, features a similar drum beat to the "You're a Customer" outro.

== Track listing ==
#	Title	Performer(s)	Time
1	"Strictly Business"	EPMD	4:47
2	"I'm Housin"	EPMD	4:01
3	"Let the Funk Flow"	EPMD	4:16
4	"You Gots to Chill"	EPMD	4:26
5	"It's My Thing"	EPMD	5:45
6	"You're a Customer"	EPMD	5:28
7	"The Steve Martin"	EPMD	4:44
8	"Get off the Bandwagon"	EPMD	4:25
9	"D.J. K La Boss"	DJ K La Boss (Scratches)	4:31
10	"Jane"	EPMD	2:59

== Personnel ==
- Erick Sermon – vocals, producer, writer
- Parish Smith – vocals, producer, writer
- DJ K La Boss – DJ (scratching)
- Jim Foley – engineer
- Charlie Marotta – engineer
- John Poppo – engineer
- Al Watts – engineer/mixing
- Gordon Davies – assistant engineer
- Rich Rahner – assistant engineer
- Herb Powers Jr. – mastering engineer
- Janette Beckman – photographer
- Eric Haze – artist (EPMD logo art)
- Susan Huyser – designer (album artwork)

== Release history ==
Region	Date	Label	Format	Catalog
Germany	1988	BCM Records	Vinyl LP	B.C. 33-2125-43
Germany	1988	BCM Records	CD	CD 076-555722
Germany	1988	BCM Records	CD	B.C. 50-2125-46
United Kingdom	1988	Sleeping Bag Records	Vinyl LP	SBUKLP 1
United States	June 7, 1988	Fresh/Sleeping Bag Records	Vinyl LP	LPRE-6
United States	June 7, 1988	Fresh/Sleeping Bag Records	Cassette	CSRE-6
United States	June 7, 1988	Fresh/Sleeping Bag Records	CD	CDRE-6
United States	July 1, 1991	Priority/EMI Records	CD	0499 2 57135 2 7/P2-57135
United States	July 1, 1991	Priority/EMI Records	Cassette	0499 2 57135 4 1/P4-57135
Worldwide (Snoop Dogg-approved remastered Priority Records’ 25th-anniversary edition)	February 23, 2010	Priority/EMI Records	CD	50999 6 26869 2 1/P2-26869
Worldwide (25th-anniversary edition)	September 3, 2013	Priority/UMe/Universal Records	CD	374 986

== Charts ==
=== Weekly charts ===
Chart (1988)	Peak position
US Billboard 200	80
US Top R&B/Hip-Hop Albums (Billboard)	1

=== Year-end charts ===
Chart (1988)	Position
US Top R&B/Hip-Hop Albums (Billboard)	20

=== Singles ===
Song	Chart (1987)	Peak position
"It's My Thing"	UK Singles Chart	97
Song	Chart (1988)	Peak position
"Strictly Business"	U.S. Hot R&B/Hip-Hop Songs	29
"Strictly Business"	UK Singles Chart	90
"You Gots to Chill"	U.S. Hot R&B/Hip-Hop Songs	22
Song	Chart (1989)	Peak position
"I'm Housin'"	UK Singles Chart	89

== Certifications ==
Region	Certification	Certified units/sales
United States (RIAA)	Gold	500,000^{^}
^{^} Shipments figures based on certification alone.

== See also ==
- List of number-one R&B albums of 1988 (U.S.)
