= Unfinished Business (EPMD album) =

Studio album by EPMD
- Released: July 25, 1989
- Studios: North Shore Soundworks; Powerplay
- Genre: East Coast hip-hop
- Length: 57:09
- Labels: Fresh; Sleeping Bag
- Producer: EPMD

EPMD chronology
Strictly Business (1988)	Unfinished Business (1989)	Business as Usual (1990)

Singles from Unfinished Business
- 1. "So Wat Cha Sayin'" Released: 1989; 2. "The Big Payback" Released: 1989; 3. "You Had Too Much to Drink" Released: 1989

Unfinished Business is the second album by hip-hop duo EPMD. Released July 25, 1989, the album built upon the success of the group's previous album Strictly Business, which was released the previous year. The lead single, "So Wat Cha Sayin'," was the only charting single released from the album. It was the second album from the group to hit No. 1 on the Top R&B/Hip-Hop Albums chart.

The album was certified Gold by the RIAA on October 16, 1989. It was one of three albums that Priority/EMI Records acquired from Sleeping Bag Records when it ceased operations in 1991; the other two were EPMD's debut, Strictly Business, and Nice & Smooth’s self-titled album. The rest of the Fresh/Sleeping Bag Records catalog was acquired by Warlock Records.

== Reception ==
Professional ratings
Review scores
Source	Rating
AllMusic	4.5/5 stars
The Encyclopedia of Popular Music	4/5 stars
RapReviews	8.5/10
(The New) Rolling Stone Album Guide	4/5 stars
The Village Voice	B+

Trouser Press wrote that "the rudimentary self-production of Unfinished Business is its most engaging asset: Sermon and his largely silent partner Parrish Smith (the band’s acronym stands for Erick and Parrish Making Dollars) sound like a couple of kids fooling around in mom’s basement, rapping about nothing, singing a line or two, making cut-in jokes with some favorite records and generally amusing themselves while the tape runs."

In 1998, the album was selected as one of The Source's 100 Best Rap Albums and, in 2005, was ranked No. 7 on comedian Chris Rock's Top 25 Hip-Hop Albums of all-time list for Rolling Stone.

== Track listing ==
All songs produced by EPMD

No.	Title	Length
1.	"So Wat Cha Sayin'"	4:57
2.	"Total Kaos"	4:34
3.	"Get the Bozack"	4:12
4.	"Jane II"	3:33
5.	"Please Listen to My Demo"	3:01
6.	"It's Time 2 Party"	4:37
7.	"Who's Booty"	4:18
8.	"The Big Payback"	4:50
9.	"Strictly Snappin' Necks"	4:29
10.	"Knick Knack Patty Wack (Feat. K-Solo)"	4:56
11.	"You Had Too Much to Drink (Feat. Frank B.)"	7:21
12.	"It Wasn't Me, It Was the Fame"	6:20
Total length:		57:09

== Charts ==
Chart (1989)	Peak position
US Billboard 200	53
US Top R&B/Hip Hop Albums	1

== Certifications ==
Region	Certification	Certified units/sales
United States (RIAA)	Gold	500,000^{^}
^{^} Shipments figures based on certification alone.

== See also ==
- List of Billboard number-one R&B albums of 1989
