= Sleeping Bag Records =

American record label

- Parent company: Phase One Network/Traffic Entertainment Group
- Founded: 1981
- Founder: Arthur Russell, William Socolov, Juggy Gales
- Defunct: 1992
- Status: Defunct
- Genre: Dance, hip hop
- Country of origin: U.S.
- Location: New York City

Sleeping Bag Records was a New York City-based independent record label founded by musician Arthur Russell and entrepreneur Will Socolov. It was active between 1981 and 1992, and specialized in dance music and hip hop.

== Background and history ==
The label was founded in 1981 initially to release singles produced by Arthur Russell under his various dance aliases. Their first release was the Dinosaur L album 24→24 Music (1981). The label's roster would eventually include Mantronix, Just-Ice, Nice & Smooth, T La Rock, EPMD and Stezo; freestyle vocalists Nocera and Kariya ("Let Me Love You for Tonight"); and R&B singer-songwriter Joyce Sims.

In 1983, Juggy Gayles began promoting singles for the company. Later, he became a partner. The label's corporate logo was a drawing of a koala. Sub-label Fresh Records was founded in 1985. Kurtis Mantronik, in addition to being the musician of the hip-hop duo Mantronix, worked for the label in an A&R capacity.

After folding in 1992, the Sleeping Bag catalog sat in limbo for several years. In 1996, the label and its catalog were purchased by Warlock Records, which has since been re-releasing its titles with the Sleeping Bag and Fresh logos alongside the Warlock Records logo. The building in Manhattan where the label had its headquarters was torn down in the 1990s, and a luxury apartment building now stands in its place.

In 2006, the label became one of many imprints’ catalogs that became Traffic Entertainment Group, which has been releasing new versions of the classic albums in Sleeping Bag’s catalog with their original artwork intact.

== In popular culture ==
- EPMD rhymed about its record-signing experience with sub-label Fresh Records in the song "Please Listen to My Demo" from its 1989 Unfinished Business album.
- Label partner Juggy Gayles was crank-called by the Jerky Boys on "The Hucklebuck" track from 1999's Stop Staring at Me! album. Gayles was the publisher of the original version of "The Hucklebuck," released by Paul Williams and His Hucklebuckers in 1949.

== See also ==
- Fresh Records
- List of record labels
