= All the Greatest Hits (Zapp & Roger album) =

Greatest hits album by Zapp & Roger
- Released: October 26, 1993
- Genres: Funk; electro-funk; R&B
- Length: 75:18
- Label: Reprise

Zapp & Roger chronology
Zapp Vibe (1989)	All the Greatest Hits (1993)	The Compilation: Greatest Hits II and More (1996)

Singles from All the Greatest Hits
- 1. "Mega Medley" Released: July 28, 1993; 2. "Slow and Easy" Released: October 21, 1993

Professional ratings
Review scores
Source	Rating
AllMusic	4.5/5 stars

All the Greatest Hits is the first official greatest hits album by American funk band Zapp (then credited as Zapp & Roger), released October 26, 1993, via Reprise Records. The album contains songs Zapp performed as a band from their first four albums, as well as songs from Roger Troutman's solo albums. It peaked at No. 39 on the Billboard 200 and No. 9 on the R&B chart.

Two new songs were also included on the album: "Mega Medley" and "Slow and Easy", which were released as singles. The latter is the band's highest chart appearance to date on the Billboard Hot 100, peaking at No. 43 in 1993.

== Track listing ==
All tracks are written by Roger and Larry Troutman, except where noted

No.	Title	Writer(s)	Original album (artist)	Length
1.	"More Bounce to the Ounce"	Roger Troutman	Zapp (Zapp)	5:14
2.	"Be Alright"		Zapp (Zapp)	2:43
3.	"I Heard It Through the Grapevine"	Barrett Strong; Norman Whitfield	The Many Facets of Roger (Roger)	6:48
4.	"So Ruff, So Tuff"		The Many Facets of Roger (Roger)	3:35
5.	"Do It Roger"		The Many Facets of Roger (Roger)	5:17
6.	"Dance Floor"		Zapp II (Zapp)	5:13
7.	"Doo Wa Ditty (Blow That Thing)"		Zapp II (Zapp)	3:46
8.	"I Can Make You Dance"		Zapp III (Zapp)	4:00
9.	"Heartbreaker"		Zapp III (Zapp)	4:15
10.	"In the Mix"		The Saga Continues... (Roger)	3:29
11.	"Midnight Hour [Live '93 Remix]"	Steve Cropper; Wilson Pickett	The Saga Continues... (Roger)	5:08
12.	"Computer Love"	Shirley Murdock; Roger Troutman; Larry Troutman	The New Zapp IV U (Zapp)	4:44
13.	"Night and Day '93"		Unlimited! (Roger)	3:08
14.	"I Want to Be Your Man"		Unlimited! (Roger)	4:11
15.	"Curiosity '93"		Bridging the Gap (Roger)	4:28
16.	"Slow and Easy"	Shirley Murdock; Roger Troutman; Larry Troutman	(new song)	5:11
17.	"Mega Medley"		(new song)	4:08
Total length:				1:15:18

== Charts ==
Chart (1993)	Peak position
US Billboard 200	39
US R&B Albums (Billboard)	9

== Certifications ==
Region	Certification	Certified units/sales
United States (RIAA)	Platinum	1,000,000^{^}
^{^} Shipments figures based on certification alone.
