= Zapp discography =

- Studio albums: 7
- Singles: 22
- Compilation albums: 2

The discography of Zapp, an American funk band, consists of seven studio albums, twenty-two singles, and two official compilation albums.

== Albums ==
=== Studio albums ===
List of studio albums, with selected details, chart positions and certifications
Title	Album details	Peak chart positions		Certifications
Title	Album details	US	US R&B	Certifications
Zapp	Released: 1980; Label: Warner Bros.; Formats: LP, CD, cassette	19	1	RIAA: Gold
Zapp II	Released: 1982; Label: Warner Bros.; Formats: LP, CD, cassette	25	2	RIAA: Gold
Zapp III	Released: 1983; Label: Warner Bros.; Formats: LP, CD, cassette	39	9	
The New Zapp IV U	Released: 1985; Label: Warner Bros.; Formats: LP, CD, cassette	110	8	RIAA: Gold
Zapp V	Released: September 12, 1989; Label: Reprise; Formats: LP, CD, cassette	154	34	
Zapp VI: Back by Popular Demand	Released: January 21, 2003; Label: Zapp Town; Formats: CD, digital download	—	—	
Zapp VII: Roger & Friends	Released: 2018; Label: Leopard Records; Formats: LP, CD	—	—	
"—" denotes releases that did not chart.

=== Compilation albums ===
List of compilation albums, with selected details and chart positions
Title	Album details	Peak chart positions		Certifications
Title	Album details	US	US R&B	Certifications
All the Greatest Hits	Released: October 26, 1993; Label: Reprise; Formats: LP, CD, cassette	39	9	RIAA: Gold
The Compilation: Greatest Hits II and More	Released: November 19, 1996; Label: Reprise; Formats: CD	—	93	
"—" denotes releases that did not chart.

== Singles ==
List of singles, with selected chart positions
Title	Year	Peak chart positions						Album
Title	Year	US	US R&B	US Sales	US Dance	US Rhythmic	UK	Album
"More Bounce to the Ounce"	1980	86	2	—	19	—	—	Zapp
"Be Alright"	1981	—	26	—	—	—	—	Zapp
"Doo Wa Ditty (Blow That Thing)"	1982	103	10	—	—	—	—	Zapp II
"A Touch of Jazz (Playin' Kinda Ruff Part II)"	1982	103	10	—	—	—	—	Zapp II
"Dance Floor"	1982	101	1	—	62	—	—	Zapp II
"Playin' Kinda Ruff"	1982	—	—	—	—	—	—	Zapp II
"Do You Really Want an Answer?"	1982	—	—	—	—	—	—	Zapp II
"Heartbreaker"	1983	107	15	—	—	—	—	Zapp III
"I Can Make You Dance"	1983	102	4	—	—	—	—	Zapp III
"Spend My Whole Life"	1984	—	77	—	—	—	—	Zapp III
"Play Some Blues"	1984	—	77	—	—	—	—	Zapp III
"Radio People"	1985	—	—	—	—	—	—	The New Zapp IV U
"It Doesn't Really Matter"	1985	—	41	—	—	—	57	The New Zapp IV U
"Itchin' for Your Twitchin'"	1986	—	81	—	—	—	—	The New Zapp IV U
"Computer Love"	1986	108	8	13	—	—	64	The New Zapp IV U
"Ooh Baby Baby"	1989	—	18	—	—	—	—	Zapp Vibe
"Fire"	1989	—	—	—	—	—	—	Zapp Vibe
"Jake E Stanstill"	1989	—	—	—	—	—	—	Zapp Vibe
"I Play the Talk Box"	1989	—	—	—	—	—	—	Zapp Vibe
"Mega Medley"	1993	54	30	5	—	33	—	All the Greatest Hits
"Slow and Easy"	1993	43	18	—	—	15	—	All the Greatest Hits
"Living for the City"	1996	120	57	—	—	—	—	The Compilation: Greatest Hits II and More
"—" denotes releases that did not chart. Computer Love Didn’t chart on the bubbling under hot 100 until 1994
