= Self Explanatory (Ne-Yo album) =

Studio album by Ne-Yo
- Released: July 15, 2022
- Genre: R&B
- Length: 41:24
- Labels: Compound; Motown
- Producers: The Aristocrats; Cardiak; DeCarlo; Digi; Don Mills; Drew Banga; Ebenezer; FrankieOnTheGuitar; Hitmaka; Julia Lewis; Magnus Klausen; Mally Mall; Paul Cabbin; Remo; Retro Future; RoccStar

Ne-Yo chronology
| Another Kind of Christmas (2019) | Self Explanatory (2022) | Highway 79 (2026) |

Singles from Self Explanatory
- 1. "U 2 Luv" Released: May 29, 2020; 2. "What If" Released: September 24, 2021; 3. "Stay Down" Released: December 17, 2021; 4. "Don't Love Me" Released: April 14, 2022; 5. "You Got the Body" Released: June 17, 2022

Self Explanatory is the ninth studio album by American singer Ne-Yo. It was released by Compound Entertainment and Motown on July 15, 2022.

Self Explanatory debuted at number 184 on the US Billboard 200, marking his lowest charting album in the country.

== Critical reception ==
Professional ratings
Review scores
| Source | Rating |
|---|---|
| AllMusic | 3.5/5 stars |
| The Guardian | 3/5 stars |

Andy Kellman of AllMusic gave Self Explanatory three and a half stars out of five and called it Ne-Yo's "most biographical album yet." Ammar Kalia from The Guardian remarked that "strong vocals and head-nodding moments aside, the R&B singer-songwriter's latest record falls short of his career highs." He found that "the pleasant nostalgia of [the] highlights isn't enough to carry the record as a whole: tracks such as "Proud of You," "Call Me Up" and "No Loot" play as mid-tempo filler."

== Chart performance ==
Self Explanatory debuted at number 184 on the US Billboard 200 in the week ending July 30, 2022. This marks Ne-Yo's lowest-charting album; his 2019 Christmas album Another Kind of Christmas failed to chart. On Billboard's component charts, the album also entered the Current Album Sales at number 59.

== Track listing ==
Self Explanatory track listing
| No. | Title | Writer(s) | Producer(s) | Length |
|---|---|---|---|---|
| 1. | "Layin' Low" (featuring Zae France) | Shaffer Smith; Aquil Jackson; Avery Segers; Calvin Hay; Remo Green; Xavier France; Anthony Nixon | Remo | 3:01 |
| 2. | "You Got the Body" | Smith; Brent Vikaden Montgomery; Chaz Jackson; Leon Youngbblood Jr.; Orlando Williamson | RoccStar; The Aristocrats | 2:56 |
| 3. | "After Party" | Smith; Carl McCormick; Christian Ward; Corey Crowe; Gabrielle "Goldie" Nowelle; Larry Troutman; Lerron Carson; Roger Troutman; Shirley Murdock | Cardiak; Hitmaka; Paul Cabbin | 3:15 |
| 4. | "Handle Me Gently" | Smith; Crowe; Jamil George Chammas; John Perkins | Digi | 3:01 |
| 5. | "Don't Love Me" | Smith; Jamal Rashid | Mally Mall | 2:47 |
| 6. | "U 2 Luv" (featuring Jeremih) | Smith; Youngblood; L. Troutman; R. Troutman; Murdock; James Mtume; Jeremy Phillip Felton; Teddy Pena | Retro Future | 3:28 |
| 7. | "Push Up" (featuring Trippie Redd) | Smith; Francisco Baptista; Igor Mamet; Michael Lamar White II | FrankieOnTheGuitar | 2:29 |
| 8. | "Proud of You" | Smith; Green; Crowe; Chauncey Alexander Hollis Jr | Remo | 3:31 |
| 9. | "Call Me Up" | Smith; Hay; Ebenezer Fabiyi; Magnus Klausen | Ebenezer; Klausen | 3:17 |
| 10. | "What If" | Smith; Hay; Fabiyi; Klausen; Jae Stephens; Marlon Roudette | Ebenezer; Klausen | 3:43 |
| 11. | "Want It All or Nothing" | Smith; Hay; Miloš Angelov; Terence Coles | DeCarlo; Don Mills | 3:23 |
| 12. | "No Loot" | Smith; Green; Crowe; Hay; Jackson; Segers; Nixon | Remo | 2:43 |
| 13. | "Stay Down" (featuring Yung Bleu) | Smith; Rashid; Andrew Laquan Arnett; Benjamin Falik | Drew Banga; Julia Lewis; Mally Mall | 3:50 |
| Total length: | | | | 41:24 |

== Personnel ==
Musicians

- Ne-Yo – vocals
- Zae France – vocals (track 1)
- RoccStar – programming (2)
- Cardiak – programming (2)
- Hitmaka – programming (2)
- Paul Cabbin – programming (2)
- Retro Future – programming (6)
- Jeremih – vocals (6)
- Trippie Redd – rap vocals (7)
- Ebenezer – programming (9, 10)
- Magnus Klausen – programming (9, 10)
- Curtis "Sauce" Wilson – vocal programming (9, 10)
- Yung Bleu – rap vocals (13)

Technical

- Gene Grimaldi – mastering (1, 2, 4–13)
- Kevin "KD" Davis – mixing (1, 2, 4–13)
- Jaycen Joshua – mastering, mixing (3)
- Curtis "Sauce" Wilson – engineering, vocal production
- DJ Riggins – mixing assistance (3)
- Jacob Richards – mixing assistance (3)
- Mike Seaberg – mixing assistance (3)

== Charts ==
Chart performance for Self Explanatory
| Chart (2022) | Peak position |
|---|---|
| US Billboard 200 | 184 |

== Release history ==
Self Explanatory release history
| Region | Date | Format | Label | Ref(s) |
|---|---|---|---|---|
| Various | July 22, 2022 | CD; digital download; streaming | Compound; Motown | |
