= Whut? Thee Album =

Studio album by Redman
- Released: September 22, 1992
- Recorded: 1991–1992
- Studio: Ian London (East Islip, New York); North Shore Soundworks (Commack, New York); Power Play (New York City)
- Genre: East Coast hip-hop; hardcore hip-hop; psychedelic rap
- Length: 51:42
- Label: Rush; Def Jam; Chaos; Columbia
- Producer: Erick Sermon; Redman; Pete Rock

Redman chronology
Whut? Thee Album (1992)	Dare Iz a Darkside (1994)

Singles from Whut? Thee Album
- 1. "Blow Your Mind" Released: August 25, 1992; 2. "Time 4 Sum Aksion" Released: January 12, 1993; 3. "Tonight's da Night" Released: May 4, 1993

Whut? Thee Album is the debut studio album by American rapper and record producer Redman. It was released through Def Jam Recordings, Rush Associated Labels, and Chaos Recordings, a division of Columbia Records, on September 22, 1992. Taking place at Ian London Studios, North Shore Soundworks, and Power Play Studios, the recording sessions began in 1991 and continued into 1992. The album was produced by Redman (under his birth name, Reggie Noble), his mentor and fellow Hit Squad member Erick Sermon, and Pete Rock.

Upon its release, Whut? Thee Album debuted at number 59 on the US Billboard 200, and peaked at number 49 the following week. In June 1993, the album was certified Gold by the Recording Industry Association of America (RIAA), exceeding the sales of 500,000 copies in the United States.

The album initially garnered favorable reviews from music critics due to Redman's humorous lyrics, and the album's production, which was noted as having the "EPMD sound". Over the years, Whut? Thee Album has been described as a classic hip hop album, among Redman's best work.

== Background ==
Reggie "Redman" Noble spent the majority of his youth selling drugs and DJing at clubs and parties. At the age of 16, he began rapping, heavily influenced by the comedy raps of Biz Markie. In 1990, Redman first met the hip hop duo EPMD—with whom he would soon become affiliated—while DJing for Lords of the Underground member DoItAll at a club. At this event, Redman impressed EPMD member Erick Sermon with his raps at a backstage freestyle cipher; Sermon subsequently invited Redman to perform during EPMD's set. Before long, EPMD quickly embraced Redman as a Hit Squad member, and they brought him on tour to freestyle and DJ at their shows. In addition, EPMD gave Redman two guest spots—for the songs "Hardcore" and "Brothers on My Jock"—on their third album, Business as Usual (1990). These appearances helped Redman gain exposure in the hip hop underground. One year later, he was signed to Def Jam, where he began writing and recording what would eventually become Whut? Thee Album.

According to Erick Sermon, Q-Tip from A Tribe Called Quest was instrumental in Redman's obtaining a record deal. Q-Tip had been in the Rush Management offices, and after hearing Redman's song "Jam 4 U", tried to persuade Lyor Cohen to give Redman a deal. Sermon recounted that Cohen was not initially interested in the material, but became convinced after hearing Redman on an early bootleg of EPMD's "Head Banger".

Recording for Whut? Thee Album began in 1991, and continued into 1992; it took place at Ian London Studios, North Shore Soundworks, and Power Play Studios. During this time, Redman collaborated with EPMD again, appearing on their 1992 album Business Never Personal. Just as EPMD's Parish Smith was often credited for mentoring Hit Squad artists Das EFX and K-Solo, Erick Sermon helped mentor Redman throughout the album, and received co-production credits for most of the album's songs. In spite of this, Redman was still left alone throughout the majority of the writing and recording process. He later recollected, "For that whole album I was under a lot of pressure to learn, and learn quickly. Erick showed me a couple of recording moves, then threw me in the studio and just left me there. I had to learn and do it myself. Erick was always there if I really needed him, so it wasn't that bad. But he had his own shit to deal with and he figured I was okay on my own." Redman further stated, "When I first started doing the album I was mad at Erick for leaving me in the studio. I was like 'what the fuck am I doing here?' I had an album to hit the world with, and it was just up to me. But I'm glad he did it, because I learned everything that I needed to."

== Critical reception ==
Professional ratings
Review scores
Source	Rating
AllMusic	4.5/5 stars
Robert Christgau	(neither)
The Encyclopedia of Popular Music	4/5 stars
Entertainment Weekly	A−
Melody Maker	4.5/5 stars
RapReviews	10/10
The Source	4.5/5 stars

Whut? Thee Album received favorable reviews from music critics upon its release. Entertainment Weekly's James Bernard gave the album an A− rating, and called it "engaging, hilarious, bargain-basement funk that doesn't care what you think". In its November 1992 issue, The Source magazine rated it 4½ out of 5 "mics", with writer Matty C declaring the album as living up to the expectations it accumulated in the previous year. Although he was un-favorable of its skits, he praised the album's "funky" production, and Redman's charismatic lyrics and flow, stating "...not only has he mastered the laid back, homicidal flow, but he can also have you picking yourself up from the floor from his hysterical punchlines". In his review for The Washington Post, Gil Griffin wrote "EPMD produced this album and give it their trademark, thick hard funky stamp, while Redman kicks it with his deep, convincing voice, likening himself to a psycho, a lover and a fighter. The booming drums come in extra handy on "Blow Your Mind," "Time 4 Sum Aksion" and "So Ruff," where he flows with free-style rhymes".

Since its release, Whut? Thee Album has risen in stature, and has been regarded as a hip hop classic from several music critics and writers. In 1998, it was included in the Source magazine's 100 Best Rap Albums list. In 2000, Melody Maker gave the album 4½ out of 5 stars, while calling it a "landmark hip-hop album". AllMusic's Steve Huey stated, "Whut? Thee Album is a terrific debut that established Redman as one of the top MCs on the East Coast. His aggressive delivery is more than hardcore enough for the streets, but Whut? is first and foremost a party record ... He's able to carry it all off with a singular sense of style, thanks to a wild sense of humor that results in some outlandish boasts, surreal threats, and hilarious left-field jokes." In 2008, Henry Adaso from About.com ranked Whut? Thee Album number five on his Best Rap Albums of 1992 list, and number 32 on his 100 Greatest Hip-Hop Albums list.

== Commercial performance ==
Whut? Thee Album debuted at 49 on the US Billboard 200 chart and peaked at number five on the US Top R&B/Hip-Hop Albums chart. In June 1993, the album was certified gold by the Recording Industry Association of America (RIAA) for sales of over 500,000 copies in the United States. As of October 2009, the album has 654,800 copies in the United States.

== Track listing ==
No.	Title	Writer(s)	Producer(s)	Length
1.	"Psycho Ward"	Reggie Noble	Reggie Noble	1:28
2.	"Time 4 Sum Aksion"	Noble; Lawrence Muggerud; Lowell Fulson; Jimmy McCracklin; Roger Troutman; Larry Troutman	Erick Sermon; Reggie Noble (co.)	3:25
3.	"Da Funk"	Noble; George Clinton; Bootsy Collins; Bernie Worrell	Erick Sermon; Reggie Noble (co.)	2:18
4.	"News Break"	Noble	Reggie Noble	0:38
5.	"So Ruff" (featuring DJ Scratch)	Noble; Robert Bell; Claydes Smith; Robert Mickens; Don Boyce; Ricky Westfield; Dennis Thomas; Ronald Bell; George Brown; Clinton; Collins; Worrell; Garry M. Shider	Erick Sermon; Reggie Noble (co.)	3:47
6.	"Rated 'R'"	Noble; James Brown	Erick Sermon; Reggie Noble (co.)	3:21
7.	"Watch Yo Nuggets" (featuring Erick Sermon and Charlie Marotta)	Noble; Clinton; David L. Spradley; Shider	Erick Sermon; Reggie Noble (co.)	3:50
8.	"Psycho Dub"	Noble	Reggie Noble	0:28
9.	"Jam 4 U"	Noble; Teddy Riley; Timmy Gatling; Gene Griffin; Aaron Hall	Erick Sermon; Reggie Noble (co.)	3:06
10.	"Blow Your Mind"	Noble; Raymond Calhoun	Erick Sermon; Reggie Noble (co.)	3:56
11.	"Hardcore"	Sermon; Parrish Smith	Erick Sermon; Parrish Smith; Mr. Bozack (co.)	1:59
12.	"Funky Uncles"	Noble	Reggie Noble	1:06
13.	"Redman Meets Reggie Noble"	Noble	Reggie Noble	2:31
14.	"Tonight's da Night"	Noble; Jesse Stone; Rick James	Erick Sermon; Reggie Noble (co.)	3:22
15.	"Blow Your Mind (Remix)"	Noble; Clinton; Collins; Jim Vitti; J.S. Theracon; R. Troutman; L. Troutman	Reggie Noble	3:18
16.	"I'm a Bad"	Noble	Erick Sermon; Reggie Noble (co.)	2:52
17.	"Sessed One Night"	Noble	Reggie Noble	0:49
18.	"How to Roll a Blunt"	Noble; Kenneth M. Burke; Allan Felder; Norma Jean Wright	Reggie Noble; Pete Rock (co.)	3:23
19.	"Sooper Luver Interview"	Noble	Reggie Noble	0:53
20.	"A Day of Sooperman Lover"	Noble; J. Brown; Fred Wesley; John Starks; Johnny "Guitar" Watson	Erick Sermon; Reggie Noble	3:50
21.	"Encore"	Noble	Reggie Noble	1:21
Total length:				51:42

Sample credits

- "Time 4 Sum Aksion"
  - contains samples from "How I Could Just Kill a Man", written by Louis Freese, Senen Reyes, Lawrence Muggerud, Lowell Fulson, and Jimmy McCracklin; and performed by Cypress Hill.
  - contains samples from "Playin' Kinda Ruff", written by Roger Troutman and Larry Troutman, and performed by Zapp.
- "Da Funk" contains samples from "P. Funk (Wants to Get Funked Up)", written by George Clinton, Bootsy Collins, and Bernie Worrell; and performed by Parliament.
- "So Ruff"
  - contains elements from "Jungle Boogie", written by Robert Bell, Claydes Smith, Robert Mickens, Don Boyce, Ricky Westfield, Dennis Thomas, Ronald Bell, and George Brown; and performed by Kool & the Gang.
  - contains samples from "Flash Light", written by George Clinton, Bootsy Collins, and Bernie Worrell; and performed by Parliament.
  - contains samples from "Bop Gun", written by George Clinton, Bootsy Collins, and Garry M. Shider; and performed by Parliament.
- "Rated 'R'" contains elements from "Soul Power", written by James Brown and performed by Maceo and the Macks.
- "Watch Yo Nuggets" contains samples from "Atomic Dog", written by George Clinton, David L. Spradley, and Garry M. Shider; and performed by George Clinton.
- "Jam 4 U" embodies portions of "Teddy's Jam", written by Teddy Riley, Timmy Gatling, Gene Griffin, and Aaron Hall; and performed by Guy.
- "Blow Your Mind" includes excerpts from "Outstanding", written by Raymond Calhoun and performed by the Gap Band.
- "Tonight's da Night"
  - embodies portions of "Don't Let Go", written by Jesse Stone and performed by Isaac Hayes.
  - contains samples from "All Night Long, written by Rick James and performed by the Mary Jane Girls.
- "Blow Your Mind (Remix)"
  - contains samples from "The Show", written by Ricky Walters and Douglas Davis, and performed by Doug E. Fresh.
  - contains samples from "Dance Floor", written by Roger Troutman and Larry Troutman, and performed by Zapp.
  - contains samples from "Theme from the Black Hole", written by George Clinton, Bootsy Collins, and J.S. Theracon; and performed by Parliament.
- "How to Roll a Blunt" contains samples from "Risin' to the Top", written by Kenneth M. Burke, Allan Felder, and Norma Jean Wright; and performed by Keni Burke.
- "A Day of Sooperman Lover"
  - contains elements from "The Payback", written by James Brown, Fred Wesley, and John Starks; and performed by James Brown.
  - contains elements from "Superman Lover", written and performed by Johnny "Guitar" Watson.

== Personnel ==
- Timothy Carter – photography
- Rod Cee – mixing assistant
- The Drawing Board – art direction, design
- Charlie "No Click Track" Marotta – engineer
- Everett "Bizz-E" Ramos – assistant engineer (track 11)
- Ivan "Doc" Rodriguez – mixing, engineer (track 11)
- Erick Sermon – executive producer
- Ken Wallace – engineer

== Charts ==
=== Weekly charts ===
Chart (1992)	Peak position
US Billboard 200	49
US Top R&B/Hip-Hop Albums (Billboard)	5

=== Singles ===
Year	Single	Peak chart positions		
Year	Single	U.S. Hot Dance Music/Maxi-Singles Sales	U.S. Hot R&B/Hip-Hop Singles & Tracks	U.S. Hot Rap Singles
1992	"Blow Your Mind"	4	42	1
1993	"Time 4 Sum Aksion"	32	63	1
1993	"Tonight's da Night"	—	78	20
"—" denotes releases that did not chart.

== Certifications ==
Region	Certification	Certified units/sales
United States (RIAA)	Gold	500,000^{^}
^{^} Shipments figures based on certification alone.

== Bibliography ==
- Coleman, Brian (2007). Check the Technique. Random House. ISBN 978-0-8129-7775-2.
