= Shirley Murdock! =

Studio album by Shirley Murdock
- Released: February 18, 1986
- Recorded: 1985
- Genre: Soul
- Length: 63:26
- Label: Elektra
- Producer: Roger Troutman

Shirley Murdock chronology
| Shirley Murdock! (1986) | A Woman's Point of View (1988) |

Professional ratings
Review scores
| Source | Rating |
|---|---|
| AllMusic | 4/5 stars |

Shirley Murdock! is the debut studio album by the American soul singer Shirley Murdock. The album was released on February 18, 1986, and included the charting singles "Be Free", "As We Lay" and "Go on Without You".

== Track listing ==
Side One
| No. | Title | Writer(s) | Length |
|---|---|---|---|
| 1. | "Be Free" | Roger; Larry Troutman | 5:00 |
| 2. | "No More" | Gregory Jackson; Shirley Murdock; Roger; Larry Troutman | 5:25 |
| 3. | "Go on Without You" | Roger; Larry Troutman | 4:51 |
| 4. | "Truth or Dare" | Gregory Jackson; Shirley Murdock; Roger | 3:55 |

Side Two
| No. | Title | Writer(s) | Length |
|---|---|---|---|
| 1. | "Danger Zone" | Gregory Jackson; Shirley Murdock; Roger | 5:53 |
| 2. | "Teaser" | Gregory Jackson; Shirley Murdock; Roger | 4:41 |
| 3. | "As We Lay" | Billy Beck; Larry Troutman | 5:56 |
| 4. | "The One I Need" | Roger; Larry Troutman | 4:43 |
| 5. | "Tribute" | Shirley Murdock | 1:23 |

CD bonus tracks
| No. | Title | Length |
|---|---|---|
| 10. | "Truth or Dare" (European Mix) | 7:38 |
| 11. | "No More" (Extended Mix) | 5:23 |
| 12. | "As We Lay" (Midnight Mix) | 5:31 |
| 13. | "Tribute" (Extended Mix) | 3:07 |

== Personnel ==
Adapted from AllMusic

- Shirley Murdock – lead vocals, backing vocals
- Billy Beck – keyboards, backing vocals
- Dale DeGroat – keyboards, backing vocals
- Gregory Jackson – keyboards, backing vocals
- Roger Lynch – keyboards
- Roger Troutman – keyboards, lead guitars, rhythm guitars, horns, backing vocals
- Terry "Zapp" Troutman – keyboards, horns
- Aaron Blackmon – lead guitars, rhythm guitars, horns
- Lester Troutman – drums
- Robert "Kuumba" Jones – congas
- Larry Troutman – congas, backing vocals
- Sherman Fleetwood – horns
- Jannetta Boyce – backing vocals
- Ray Davis – backing vocals
- Larry Hatcher – backing vocals

Production

- Roger Troutman – producer
- Carol Friedman – art direction
- Sue Keston – design
- Michele Singer – photography
- Marion Caldwell – hair stylist
- Jean Derrickson – make-up

Technical credits

- Ralph Aikens – recording, mixing, editing
- Michael Braunstein – recording, mixing, editing
- Janine Connors – recording, mixing, editing
- Paul Logus – recording, mixing, editing
- Lester Troutman – recording, mixing, editing
- Michael Warren – recording, mixing, editing
- Dale DeGroat – mixing
- Gregory Jackson – mixing
- Shirley Murdock – mixing
- Roger Troutman – mixing, editing
- Terry "Zapp" Troutman – mixing, editing
