= U 2 Luv =

2020 song by Ne-Yo and Jeremih

Single by Ne-Yo and Jeremih

from the album Self Explanatory
- Released: May 29, 2020
- Genre: R&B
- Length: 3:28
- Label: Motown
- Songwriters: Shaffer Smith; Jeremy Phillip Felton; James Mtume; Larry Troutman; Leon Youngblood Jr.; Roger; Shirley Murdock; Teddy Pena
- Producer: Retro Future

Ne-Yo singles chronology
"Over Again" (2020)	"U 2 Luv" (2020)	"Shake" (2021)

Jeremih singles chronology
"Baby Girl" (2020)	"U 2 Luv" (2020)	"Follow" (2020)

Music video
- "U 2 Luv" on YouTube

"U 2 Luv" is a song by American singer-songwriters Ne-Yo and Jeremih. It was released on May 29, 2020. The song interpolates elements of two classic 1980s hits – Mtume's "Juicy Fruit" and Zapp's "Computer Love". On October 23, 2020, an official remix was released, featuring rapper Lil Durk and singer Queen Naija.

== Background ==
Ne-Yo described the song on Instagram, referencing the COVID-19 quarantine: "My friend Jeremih and I have created the perfect soundtrack for you and quarantine bae".

== Music video ==
The video was uploaded on August 8, 2020, directed by Chad Tennies and Caleb Seales. The visual follows Ne-Yo and his wife, Crystal Renay, as they take to the floor of a closed roller skating rink – with a cameo from comedian Jess Hilarious – while Jeremih and his girlfriend enjoy a cozy night at home.

== Charts ==
Chart (2020)	Peak position
US Billboard Hot 100	66
US Hot R&B/Hip-Hop Songs (Billboard)	20
US Rhythmic Airplay (Billboard)	19

== Certifications ==
Certifications for "U 2 Luv"
Region	Certification	Certified units/sales
New Zealand (RMNZ)	Gold	15,000^{‡}
^{‡} Sales+streaming figures based on certification alone.
