= Sun (R&B band) =

R&B band

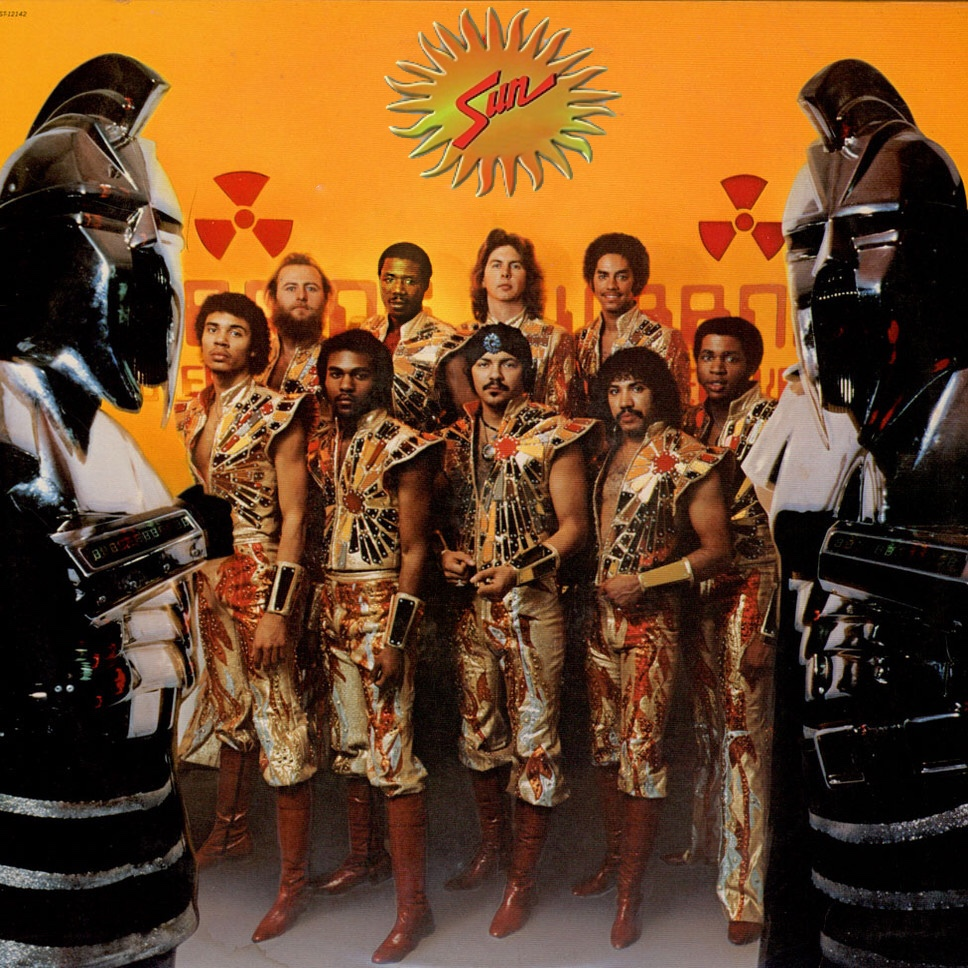
- Sun in 1981

Background information
- Origin: Dayton, Ohio, United States
- Genres: Soul; R&B; funk; disco; jazz fusion; rock
- Years active: 1976–present
- Labels: Capitol Records; Air City Records; Century Vista; Blip Blop Records
- Spinoffs: Dayton
- Spinoff of: Over Night Low
- Members: Byron Byrd; Alfred Holbrook; Alfie Harrison; Don Taylor; Tony Thompson; Krishna Black Eagle; Tiff Byrd; BBIII
- Website: sun.band

Sun is an R&B, soul, disco, and funk band that was formed in the mid-1970s and recorded prolifically for Capitol Records from 1976 to 1984. The band was founded by Byron Byrd in Dayton, Ohio, in 1976. Additional members included Kym Yancey, Chris Jones (later of Dayton), Gary King, John Wagner, Hollis Melson, and Shawn Sandridge.

== History ==
Sun was formed by Byron Byrd along with other members of his previous band, Over Night Low. They realized they needed a stronger band concept after they were approached by record producer Beau Ray Fleming one night following a performance at the Ohio Theatre in Columbus. Beau originally proposed "Celestial Sun," but they eventually shortened the name to just "Sun," with Byrd stating the inspiration as the Sun being "a universally accepted symbol of energy."

After being signed to Capitol by Larkin Arnold, Sun was faced with an immediate problem: an incomplete band. The gap was in the rhythm section, so Byron Byrd recruited Roger Troutman and Lester Troutman (of Zapp) and paid them to do some studio sessions so he could finish the album. Lester laid drum tracks with Roger on bass, then Roger overdubbed guitar for four songs on the album, including "Live On, Dream On." It was on "Wanna Make Love (Come Flick My BIC)" that Roger contributed his signature talk box embellishments.

As the first single from the debut LP, Live On, Dream On (1976), "Wanna Make Love" became Sun's first hit, peaking at #31 on Billboard’s R&B chart.

With the release of their second album, Sun Power (pressed on orange vinyl in 1977), Sun sprang into a ten-piece configuration of multi-instrumentalists and vocalists that consisted of Byron Byrd, John Hampton Wagner, Christopher D. Jones, Hollis Melson, Dean Hummons, Kym Yancey, Shawn Sandridge, Bruce Hastell, Gary King and Ernie Knisley. The album also contained the songs “Conscience” and "Time Is Passing” (sampled by many rap artists, including Dr. Dre) plus the instrumental “We’re So Hot,” which has been used in sports telecasts.

Sun had people from NASA do the cover animation for their fifth album, Sun Over The Universe (1980).

== Personnel ==
Original members

- Byron M. Byrd (tenor saxophone, keyboards, vocals)
- Kym Yancey (drums)
- John Wagner (trumpet, vocals)
- Chris Jones (trumpet, vocals)
- Hollis Melson (bass, vocals)
- Shawn Sandridge (guitar)
- Calvin Fields (bass, vocals)

== Discography ==
- The Rehearsal Tapes (1971-1972)
- Sun (1972)
- Wanna Make Love (1976)
- Sun Power (1977)
- Sunburn (1978)
- Destination Sun (1979)
- Sun Over the Universe (1980)
- Force of Nature (1981)
- Let There Be Sun (1982)
- Eclipse (1984)

== Influence ==
Sun's songs have been covered and sampled by numerous artists, including:

- MC Eiht "Streiht Up Menace" (Menace II Society Title Movie Soundtrack) covered "My Woman"

== Television ==
- United Negro College Fund "Cavalcade of Stars" Telethon
- James Brown's Future Shock
- Soul Train – "The Show Is Over"
- Soul Train – "Wanna Make Love (Come Flick My Bic)" / "They're Calling for Love" (1976)
- Soul Train – "Sun Is Here" / "Sun Of A Gun" (1978)
- Soul Train – "Pure Fire"
- WHIO-TV
- ABC Celebrity Superstars
