= Wanna Make Love =

Studio album by Sun
- Released: 1976
- Recorded: 1976
- Studio: Counterpart Recording Studios Cincinnati, Ohio
- Genre: Funk R&B
- Label: Capitol
- Producer: Byron Byrd & Beau Ray Fleming

Sun chronology
Wanna Make Love (1976)	Sun Power (1977)

Professional ratings
Review scores
Source	Rating
AllMusic	3/5 stars

Wanna Make Love is the debut album by Dayton, Ohio funk band Sun. It was originally titled Live On, Dream On but was re-released by Capitol several months later as Wanna Make Love due to the success of the single "Wanna Make Love".

== Track listing ==
1. "Live On, Dream On" (Byron Byrd) – 4:49
2. "Tell the People" (Byron Byrd, John Wagner) – 3:11
3. "My Woman" (Byron Byrd) – 5:10
4. "They're Calling for Me" (Chris Jones) – 7:05
5. "Wanna Make Love" (Byron Byrd) – 3:36
6. "Love Is Never Sure" (Harry McLoud, John Wagner) – 4:52
7. "The Show Is Over" (Byron Byrd, John Wagner, Harry McLoud, Chris Jones, Hollis Melson, Gregory Webster, Clarence Willis) – 3:59
8. "It's Killing Me" (Chris Jones) – 4:18
9. "Give Your Love to Me" (Chris Jones) – 4:01

== Personnel ==
- Byron Byrd – flute, piano, clavinet, bass, percussion, electric piano, synthesizer, tenor saxophone, lead and backing vocals
- Chris Jones – trumpet, piano, clavinet, vibraphone, drums, percussion, synthesizer, lead and backing Vocals
- Dean Hummons – organ, clavinet, piano, electric piano, synthesizer
- Hollis Melson – bass, percussion, lead and backing vocals
- Kym Yancey – drums, percussion, backing vocals
- John Wagner – trumpet, flugelhorn, trombone, percussion, lead and backing vocals
- Shawn Sandridge – lead guitar, backing vocals
- Linda Thornton – backing vocals
- Roger Troutman – guitar, talk box
- Lester Troutman – drums

== Charts ==
Chart (1976)	Peak position
US Top Soul Albums (Billboard)	54

=== Singles ===
Year	Single	Chart positions		
Year	Single	US Pop	US R&B	US Dance
1976	"Wanna Make Love"	76	31	15
