= Let There Be Love! =

Studio album by Shirley Murdock
- Released: 1991
- Studio: Troutman Sound Labs
- Genre: R&B
- Length: 38:59
- Label: Elektra
- Producer: Roger Troutman

Shirley Murdock chronology
A Woman's Point of View (1988)	Let There Be Love! (1991)	The Very Best of Shirley Murdock (2001)

Let There Be Love! is an album by the American R&B singer Shirley Murdock, released in 1991.

The album's first track, "In Your Eyes", was a top 10 R&B hit.

== Production ==
The album was produced by Roger Troutman, with assistance from Murdock and Dale DeGroat. Murdock cowrote a few songs, including "Let There Be Love" and "In Your Eyes". Let There Be Love! was recorded at Troutman Sound Labs, in Dayton, Ohio.

== Critical reception ==
Professional ratings
Review scores
Source	Rating
AllMusic	3/5 stars
MusicHound R&B: The Essential Album Guide	3.5/5 stars

Billboard called the album a "shimmering set of lush ballads and rousing dance/funk tunes." The Washington Post considered "We Should Be Together" to be the album's best song, deeming it "a funky, scat-filled jazz tune complete with plunger-mute horn riffs." The Boston Globe opined that Murdock "is one of those under-publicized and underrated singers, raised on gospel, whose power on more secular offerings is a bit too jolting for the average consumer."

The Dayton Daily News thought the album to be "solidly written and produced," praising the "heavy house-music influence" of the title track. USA Today described it as "an adult-oriented collection of lovely ballads and a few discreetly funky dance numbers that generally serve to emphasize her prowess with the slow songs."

AllMusic wrote that "while Let There Be Love! isn't the soul extravaganza Murdock is quite capable of delivering, R&B/pop ballads and slow jams like 'The Last Hurrah', 'Say It, Mean It' and the Anita Baker-ish 'Anywhere' aren't anything to be embarrassed by either." MusicHound R&B: The Essential Album Guide thought that Murdock "leaves the soap opera topics behind this time and crafts a work that fully meshes the best aspects of her gospel and secular influences."

== Track listing ==
All tracks are written by Shirley Murdock and Dale DeGroat, except where noted.

No.	Title	Writer(s)	Length
1.	"In Your Eyes"		3:58
2.	"Stay with Me Tonight"	Billy Beck, Larry Troutman, Roger Troutman, Zapp Troutman	4:02
3.	"Let There Be Love"		5:14
4.	"Say It, Mean It"	Beck, L. Troutman, R. Troutman, Z. Troutman	3:43
5.	"The Last Hurrah"		3:28
6.	"We Should Be Together"		3:31
7.	"Anywhere"		3:57
8.	"Everywhere"	Beck, L. Troutman, R. Troutman, Z. Troutman	4:17
9.	"Heavenly"	Beck, L. Troutman, R. Troutman	4:03
10.	"Save the Children"		4:06

== Personnel ==
- Shirley Murdock – vocals, backing vocals, arrangements (1, 3, 5–7, 10)
- Billy Beck – keyboards, synthesizers, backing vocals (2, 4, 8, 9)
- Dale DeGroat – keyboards, synthesizers, percussion, arrangements (1, 3, 5–7, 10), backing vocals (3, 10)
- Roger Troutman – keyboards, synthesizers, lead guitars, rhythm guitars, bass, arrangements (2, 4, 8, 9)
- Lester Troutman – drums, congas, percussion
- Carl Cowen – horns

Production

- Ruben Rodriguez – executive producer
- Roger Troutman – producer
- Dale DeGroat – co-producer (1, 3, 5–7, 10)
- Shirley Murdock – co-producer (1, 3, 5–7, 10)
- Carol Bobolts – cover design
- Kip Meyer – photography

Technical credits

- Chris Gehringer – mastering at DMS (New York City, New York)
- Dale DeGroat – engineer, mixing, editing
- Sherman Fleetwood – engineer, mixing, editing
- Shirley Murdock – engineer, mixing
- Robert Smith – engineer
- Rufus Troutman III – engineer
- Lester Troutman – engineer, mixing, editing
- Terry "Zapp" Troutman – engineer, editing
- Roger Troutman – mixing, editing
