= Blow Your Mind (Redman song) =

Single by Redman

from the album Whut? Thee Album
- Released: August 25, 1992
- Studio: Rockin' Reel Recording Studios (Northport, NY)
- Genre: East Coast hip hop; hardcore hip hop
- Length: 3:56
- Label: Rush; Chaos; Columbia
- Songwriter: Reggie Noble
- Producers: Erick Sermon; Redman (co.)

Redman singles chronology
"Blow Your Mind" (1992)	"Head Banger" (1992)

Music video
- "Blow Your Mind" on YouTube

"Blow Your Mind" is a hip hop song by American rapper Redman. It was released in August 1992 via Rush Associated Labels/Chaos/Columbia Records as the lead single from his debut studio album Whut? Thee Album. Recording sessions took place at Rockin' Reel Recording Studios in Northport. Production was handled by Erick Sermon with Redman himself serving as a co-producer. The song contains samples from "The Show", written by Doug E. Fresh and MC Ricky D, and includes excerpts from The Gap Band's "Outstanding", written by Raymond Calhoun, Zapp's "Computer Love" and Parliament's "Theme from the Black Hole".

The song peaked at number 42 on the Hot R&B/Hip-Hop Songs, number 70 on the R&B/Hip-Hop Airplay, number-one on the Hot Rap Songs and number 4 on the Dance Singles Sales charts in the United States.

== Track listing ==
No.	Title	Writer(s)	Producer(s)	Length
1.	"Blow Your Mind" (Remix)	Reginald Noble; George Clinton Jr.; William Collins; Jim Vitti; Walter Morrison; Roger Troutman; Larry Troutman	Redman
2.	"Blow Your Mind" (LP Version)	Noble	Erick Sermon; Redman (co.)
3.	"Blow Your Mind" (LP Instrumental)	Noble	Erick Sermon; Redman (co.)
4.	"Blow Your Mind" (Remix Instrumental)	Noble; Clinton Jr.; Collins; Vitti; Morrison; R. Troutman; L. Troutman	Redman
5.	"How to Roll a Blunt"	Noble; Kenneth M. Burke; Allan Felder; Norma Jean Wright	Redman

== Personnel ==
LP version

- Reginald "Redman" Noble – songwriter, vocals, co-producer, recording, mixing
- Erick Sermon – producer
- Dave Greenberg – recording, mixing

Remix

- Reginald "Redman" Noble – songwriter, vocals, producer
- Charlie Marotta – recording
- Ken Wallace – recording
- Ivan 'Doc' Rodriguez – mixing
- Rod Cee – engineering assistant

== Charts ==
Chart (1992)	Peak position
US Hot R&B/Hip-Hop Songs (Billboard)	42
US R&B/Hip-Hop Airplay (Billboard)	70
US Hot Rap Songs (Billboard)	1
US Dance Singles Sales (Billboard)	4
