= Time 4 Sum Aksion =

Single by Redman

from the album Whut? Thee Album
- B-side: "Rated 'R'"
- Released: January 12, 1993
- Recorded: 1992
- Studio: North Shore Soundworks (Commack, NY); Ian London Studios (East Islip, NY)
- Genre: East Coast hip hop; hardcore hip hop
- Length: 3:17
- Label: Def Jam; RAL; Chaos
- Songwriters: Reginald Noble; Lawrence Muggerud; Lowell Fulson; James David Walker Jr.; Roger Troutman; Larry Troutman
- Producers: Erick Sermon; Redman (co.)

Redman singles chronology
"Head Banger" (1992)	"Time 4 Sum Aksion" (1993)	"Tonight's da Night" (1993)

Music video
- "Time 4 Sum Aksion" on YouTube

"Time 4 Sum Aksion" is a song written, co-produced and performed by American rapper Redman. It was released on January 12, 1993, through Rush Associated Labels as the second single from his debut studio album Whut? Thee Album. The recording sessions took place at North Shore Soundworks in Commack and Ian London Studios in East Islip. Erick Sermon produced the song utilising samples from Cypress Hill's "How I Could Just Kill a Man" and Zapp's "Playin' Kinda Ruff".

Upon its release, the song peaked at number 63 on the Hot R&B/Hip-Hop Songs, number 62 on the R&B/Hip-Hop Airplay, number 1 on the Hot Rap Songs and number 32 on the Dance Singles Sales charts in the United States. In 2005, the song made it to number 19 on the UK Hip Hop and R&B Singles Chart.

== Song information ==
Reviewing Whut? Thee Album for AllMusic, Steve Huey has referred to the songs "Time 4 Sum Aksion" and "Rated R" as "slamming party jams".

Its chorus is a repetition of the phrase "time for some action", which is sampled from Cypress Hill's song "How I Could Just Kill a Man", which itself sampled Lowell Fulson's song "Tramp".

Within hip hop it has been referenced by Common in his song "Sum Shit I Wrote" and Masta Ace in eMC's song "What It Stand For?". It can be found on the 1995 Def Jam hits compilation, Old 2 New, New 2 Old.

== In popular culture ==
- Mike Tyson chose the song as his introduction music for his first fight upon his prison release.
- In The Simpsons episode "The Homer They Fall", the Tyson-inspired boxer Drederick Tatum also uses the song as introduction music.

== Track listing ==
No.	Title	Writer(s)	Length
1.	"Time 4 Sum Aksion" (LP Version)	Reginald Noble; Lawrence Muggerud; Lowell Fulson; Jimmy McCracklin; Roger Troutman; Larry Troutman
2.	"Time 4 Sum Aksion" (Remix)	Noble; Muggerud; Fulson; McCracklin; R. Troutman; L. Troutman
3.	"Time 4 Sum Aksion" (Remix Instrumental)	Noble; Muggerud; Fulson; McCracklin; R. Troutman; L. Troutman
4.	"Rated "R"" (LP Version)	Noble; James Brown

Sample credits

- Tracks 1 to 3 contain samples from "How I Could Just Kill a Man" written by Louis Freese, Senen Reyes, Lawrence Muggerud, Lowell Fulson and Jimmy McCracklin and performed by Cypress Hill and "Playin' Kinda Ruff" written by Roger Troutman and Larry Troutman and performed by Zapp.
- Track 4 contains elements from "Soul Power" written by James Brown and performed by Maceo and the Macks.

== Personnel ==
- Reginald "Redman" Noble – vocals, co-producer
- Erick Sermon – producer
- Charlie Marotta – recording (tracks: 1, 4)
- Ken Wallace – recording (tracks: 1, 4)
- Ivan 'Doc' Rodriguez – mixing (tracks: 1, 4)
- Dave Greenberg – engineering (tracks: 2, 3)
- Tony Dawsey – mastering

== Charts ==
Chart (1993)	Peak position
US Hot R&B/Hip-Hop Songs (Billboard)	63
US R&B/Hip-Hop Airplay (Billboard)	62
US Hot Rap Songs (Billboard)	1
US Dance Singles Sales (Billboard)	32

Chart (2005)	Peak position
UK Hip Hop/R&B (Official Charts)	19
