= Dayton (band) =

Post-disco funk band

- Origin: Dayton, Ohio, U.S.
- Genres: Funk, post-disco, electro
- Years active: 1980–1985
- Labels: Liberty, Capitol, United Artists Records
- Past members: Chris Jones; Craig E. Robinson; David Shawn Sandridge; Dean Hummons; Derrick Armstrong; Elaine Terri; Evan Rogers; Jennifer Matthews; Jenny Douglas; John Hardin; Justin Gresham

Dayton was a post-disco funk band, formed in Dayton, Ohio by Chris Jones (trumpet, keyboards, vocals) from the band Sun and Shawn Sandridge (guitar, vocals) from Over Night Low. Derrick Armstrong (vocals), Kevin Hurt (drums, percussion), Jenny Douglas (vocals) and Rachel Beavers (vocals) completed the line up. Former Sun member Dean Hummons played the keyboards on the first two Dayton albums.

== Biography ==
The group signed to Liberty Records in 1980 and released their self-titled debut album which included the track "Eyes on You". Dayton toured with Ashford & Simpson, Quincy Jones and Stephanie Mills. They recorded a second Liberty album, Cutie Pie, in 1981. Guest musicians included James "Diamond" Williams, Keith Harrison, Clarence "Chet" Willis, Billy Beck, Wes Boatman and Vincent Andrews.

The group switched to Capitol Records in 1982 and delivered the successful album Hot Fun. This record included "Krackity-Krack" with a guest appearance by Bootsy Collins and their hit cover version of Sly Stone's "Hot Fun in the Summertime".

Dayton introduced Rahni Harris as vocalist/keyboard player on their fourth album, Feel the Music in 1983, which included "The Sound of Music". "The Sound of Music" recorded on Capitol (CL318) Records was their best known track in the UK, where it reached No.75 in the UK Singles Chart for one week in late 1983. It became very popular in nightclubs throughout the UK. The song "Love You Anyway" was produced by Zapp's Roger Troutman. Harris did most of the songwriting and production.

They released their last album This Time in 1985, also produced by Harris. The single "You Should Be Dancin'" was released from this LP (the last track on side 2) but failed to chart in the UK. The album did not match their previous efforts and marked the end of Dayton.

== Discography ==
=== Albums ===
- 1980: Dayton (Liberty)
- 1981: Cutie Pie (Liberty)
- 1982: Hot Fun (Capitol)
- 1983: Feel the Music (Capitol)
- 1985: This Time (Capitol)

=== Singles ===
Year	Single	Peak chart positions			Album
Year	Single	US R&B	US 100	UK	Album
1980	"Dank"	—	—	—	Dayton
1980	"Eyes on You"	—	—	—	Dayton
1981	"Body Shaker"	—	—	—	Cutie Pie
1981	"Cutie Pie"	62	—	—	Cutie Pie
1982	"Hot Fun in the Summertime"	17	58	—	Hot Fun
1982	"Krackity Krack"	—	—	—	Hot Fun
1982	"We Can't Miss"	—	—	—	Hot Fun
1983	"Meet the Man"	—	—	—	Hot Fun
1983	"Out Tonight"	—	—	—	Feel the Music
1983	"The Sound of Music"	69	—	75	Feel the Music
1983	"It Must Be Love"	54	—	—	Feel the Music
1984	"So What"	—	—	—	Feel the Music
1985	"This Time"	81	—	—	This Time
"—" denotes releases that did not chart or were not released in that territory.
