= Feel the Music =

Feel the Music may refer to:

- Feel the Music (Ray Stevens album), 1977
- Feel the Music (Dayton album), 1983
