= I Want to Be Your Man =

- Front sleeve of 7-inch vinyl single

Single by Roger

from the album Unlimited!
- B-side: "I Really Want to Be Your Man"
- Released: September 15, 1987
- Recorded: 1986
- Studio: Troutman Recording Studios (Dayton, Ohio)
- Genre: R&B
- Length: 4:14 (album version); 3:58 (7" edit)
- Label: Reprise
- Songwriters: Larry Troutman, Roger Troutman
- Producer: Roger Troutman

Roger singles chronology
| "Girl Cut It Out" (1984) | "I Want to Be Your Man" (1987) | "Everybody (Get Up)" (1991) |

Music video
- "I Want to Be Your Man" on YouTube

"I Want to Be Your Man" is a song by American funk singer-songwriter Roger Troutman, from his third studio album Unlimited!. It was released as the lead single from the album in September 1987 by Reprise Records. The song was co-written by Roger's brother, Larry Troutman, and produced by Roger, who conceived of the song as a statement on romantic commitment. "I Want to Be Your Man" features Roger singing in both his natural tenor and his trademark talk box.

The song topped the Billboard Hot R&B Singles chart and peaked at number three on the Billboard Hot 100, his highest as lead artist and second highest overall. Internationally, the song reached number nine in the Netherlands, number 15 in Germany, number 18 in New Zealand, and number 27 in Canada. It has been featured in films such as 2000's Love & Basketball and has been sampled by numerous R&B and hip hop artists. The 2002 single "Down 4 U" by Irv Gotti featuring Ja Rule, Ashanti, Vita, and Charli Baltimore contains interpolations of the song. "I Want to Be Your Man" was covered by Charlie Wilson and Fantasia in 2010.

== Composition and production ==
Roger Troutman developed "I Want to Be Your Man" around the theme of romantic commitment. "Guys have trouble committing and women want us to commit," he explained to authors Adam White and Fred Bronson. "Women want us to admit that we don't want to commit." Troutman took the idea and began working on a track similar in style to "Computer Love," a 1986 hit for his band Zapp. "I was playing in Dallas and [Troutman's brother Larry] flew out. We sat in the hotel room one day and wrote the song. I talked to him about what I was trying to say and one thing led to another. We came back and recorded a vocal."

"I Want to Be Your Man" is a ballad featuring Roger's vocals filtered through a vocoder. According to Roger, he had never mixed his "human" voice with the talk box before, and recording the vocals was tedious because he could only play one note at a time on the vocoder. To layer six-part harmonies, he spoke the lyric while playing a melody line then rewound the tape and repeated the process for the harmonizing part while playing together with the previously recorded one. After he finished layering tracks, if he didn't like the result he had to scrap everything and start over. Larry Troutman recommended Nicole Cottom, a friend of his daughter, to help sing background vocals. Roger recalled her being in the studio one day while he was recording his vocals: "There was a spot in the song where there was a hole and I asked her to do something. It was so good, there was no need to take it out."

== Release and chart performance ==
Roger disliked "I Want to Be Your Man" when it was completed and thought it served as album filler, at best. However, executives at his label, Warner Brothers, loved the song. Label president Lenny Waronker and chairman Mo Ostin wanted to relaunch Warner's sister label Reprise Records, which had been dormant for several years, and they told Roger that "I Want to Be Your Man" would be a "perfect opening act" to bring the label back. At first, Roger was hesitant because of his familiarity with the Warner Bros. personnel, but he agreed to the move once he learned he would be working with the same R&B promotion department.

"I Want to Be Your Man" was added to US urban contemporary radio playlists in September 1987; a commercial single was released the following month. Initially, the song received heavy airplay on radio stations in California, particularly Sacramento and the San Francisco Bay Area, and in Southern states. It climbed to number one on the Billboard Hot R&B/Hip-Hop Songs chart for the week ending December 19, 1987. "I Want to Be Your Man" crossed over to pop radio and peaked at number three on the Hot 100 singles chart issue dated February 13, 1988. With the song's mainstream commercial success, Roger said, "I feel I've reached a milestone—yet the record still has flair and the ingredients that will allow black radio to take it to number one and make it a hit first." "I Want to Be Your Man" reached the top 10 in the Netherlands and Belgium, and the top 40 in Germany, New Zealand, and Canada. It peaked at number 61 on the UK Singles Chart in October 1987.

== Critical reception ==
A review of "I Want to Be Your Man" in the September 26, 1987, issue of Billboard called the single "a sultry ballad" and noted the similarity of Roger's "trademark" vocal style to that used in Zapp's recordings. In a 1987 review of Roger's Unlimited! album, Connie Johnson of the Los Angeles Times said of the song: "It's hard to resist" when Troutman sings through the voice box "with languid, shy-guy sincerity". Music critic Bruce Pollock listed the song in his 2005 book Rock Song Index: The 7500 Most Important Songs for the Rock and Roll Era.

== Usage in media ==
"I Want to Be Your Man" was included on the official soundtrack albums of the films Love & Basketball (2000), Pootie Tang (2001), and Soul Kitchen (2009). The song was used in a season two episode of the television show Everybody Hates Chris.

== Samples and cover versions ==
"I Want to Be Your Man" has been sampled or interpolated by the following artists: Janet Kay (re-titled I Want to Be The One) on her third album, Sweet Surrender, released in 1989 on the Body Music record label in the UK, Lil' Troy on the single "Where's the Love" from his album Sittin' Fat Down South (1999), Irv Gotti featuring Ja Rule, Ashanti, Vita, and Charli Baltimore on the single "Down 4 U" from The Inc. Records compilation Irv Gotti Presents: The Inc. (2002), Lil Rob on "I Wanna Be Your Man" from his Best Of compilation album (2002), T.I. on "Let Me Tell You Something" from his album Trap Muzik (2003), Jadakiss on "Hot" from his album Kiss of Death (2004), Cam'ron on "Hey Lady" from his album Purple Haze (2004), and Ironik on "I Wanna Be Your Man" from his album No Point in Wasting Tears (2008). Roger, singing different lyrics, features on Tech N9ne's "Twisted" from the latter's album Anghellic (2001).

Chico DeBarge and Shae Fiol covered "I Want to Be Your Man" on Still More Bounce, a Roger Troutman tribute album released in 2002. Charlie Wilson and Fantasia covered the song on Wilson's album Just Charlie (2010). Mark Morrison, with K.O. McCoy and Young Buck, recorded a cover version titled "Wanna Be Your Man 2.0" on Morrison's I Am What I Am EP (2014).

== Track listings and formats ==
- 7" single
1. "I Want to Be Your Man" – 3:58
2. "I Really Want to Be Your Man" – 3:47
- 12" single
1. "I Want to Be Your Man" (extended version) – 5:51
2. "I Want to Be Your Man" (7" version) – 3:58
3. "I Really Want to Be Your Man" (remix) – 3:40
4. "Bedistgutarist-A-Rown" – 3:15

== Charts ==
=== Weekly charts ===
| Chart (1987–1988) | Peak position |
|---|---|
| Belgium (Ultratop 50 Flanders) | 10 |
| Canada Top Singles (RPM) | 27 |
| New Zealand (Recorded Music NZ) | 18 |
| Netherlands (Dutch Top 40) | 8 |
| Netherlands (Single Top 100) | 9 |
| UK Singles (Official Charts) | 61 |
| US Billboard Hot 100 | 3 |
| US Adult Contemporary (Billboard) | 22 |
| US Hot Black Singles (Billboard) | 1 |
| West Germany (GfK) | 19 |

=== Year-end charts ===
| Chart (1988) | Position |
|---|---|
| Netherlands (Dutch Top 40) | 60 |
| Netherlands (Single Top 100) | 63 |
| US Billboard Hot 100 | 59 |
| US Hot Black Singles (Billboard) | 4 |
