= Unlimited! =

Studio album by Roger
- Released: 1987
- Recorded: 1986–1987
- Genre: Funk
- Label: Reprise
- Producer: Roger Troutman

Roger chronology
The Saga Continues (1984)	Unlimited! (1987)	Bridging the Gap (1991)

Unlimited! is the third solo album by Zapp frontman Roger Troutman (credited as "Roger"), released in 1987. It includes a cover of James Brown's 1965 single "Papa's Got a Brand New Bag", as well as Roger's biggest R&B and crossover hit (on the pop charts), "I Want to Be Your Man."

== Critical reception ==
Professional ratings
Review scores
Source	Rating
AllMusic	3/5 stars
Los Angeles Times	3/4 stars
New Musical Express	9/10

The Los Angeles Times called the album "a put-the-needle-anywhere LP that can only add to Troutman's still-growing reputation as a man with a solid plan for funk's future." The Orlando Sentinel labeled it a "funky, jazzy, rocking album." The St. Petersburg Times deemed "I Want to Be Your Man" "one of the best records of '87." The Sydney Morning Herald judged "Been This Way Before" "a dance track beyond George Clinton, a place where no other artist has gone before."

AllMusic considered Unlimited! to be Troutman's best solo album.

== Track listing ==
No.	Title	Length
1.	"I Want to Be Your Man"	4:14
2.	"Night and Day"	4:19
3.	"Been This Way Before (rap)"	5:11
4.	"Composition to Commemorate (May 30, 1918)"	4:48
5.	"Papa's Got a Brand New Bag"	3:45
6.	"Thrill Seekers"	4:50
7.	"Tender Moments"	4:19
8.	"If You're Serious"	4:24
9.	"Private Lover"	4:03
10.	"I Really Want to Be Your Man"	3:44
11.	"Bedistguitarist-A-Rown"	3:13

== Personnel ==
Musicians

- Roger Troutman: Lead vocals, talk box, guitar, keyboards, synthesizer, bass, congas, percussion, backing vocals
- Terry "Zapp" Troutman: Bass, keyboards, backing vocals
- Billy Beck: Keyboards, backing vocals
- Curtis Cowen: Keyboards
- Lester Troutman: Drums, congas, percussion
- Dale DeGroat: Keyboards
- Johnny Lytle: Vibraphone
- Carl Cowen, James Cameron: Horns
- Additional backing vocalists: Clete Troutman, Mark Thomas, Nicole Cottom, Ray Davis, Shirley Murdock

Production

- Producer: Roger Troutman
- Editor: Roger Troutman, Zapp Troutman, Curtis Cowen, Tony Jackson
- Mixing: Roger Troutman, Zapp Troutman, Curtis Cowen, Tony Jackson
- Engineer [Editing, Mixing, Recording] - Curtis Cowen, Lester Troutman, Charles Jackson
