= The Saga Continues... (Roger Troutman album) =

Studio album by Roger
- Released: June 1984
- Recorded: 1984, Detroit, Michigan
- Genre: Funk, electro funk
- Label: Warner Bros.
- Producer: Roger Troutman

Roger chronology
The Many Facets of Roger (1981)	The Saga Continues... (1984)	Unlimited! (1987)

The Saga Continues... is the second solo album recorded by funk musician Roger Troutman, released in 1984 on the Warner Bros. label. The album contains Troutman's cover of Wilson Pickett's "In the Midnight Hour", which reached No. 34 on the U.S. R&B chart, as well as hits "In the Mix" and "Girl Cut It Out", a duet with Wanda Rash. Like his previous solo offering, The Many Facets of Roger, Troutman and his bandmates from Zapp, including brothers Lester, Larry and Terry, helped contribute to the album.

== Track listing ==
All songs written by Roger and Larry Troutman except where noted.

1. "In the Mix" (6:22)
2. "Play Your Guitar, Brother Roger" (4:27)
3. "The Break Song" (5:50)
4. "I Keep Trying" (3:50) (Billy Beck)
5. "In the Midnight Hour" (6:58) (w/The Mighty Clouds of Joy) (Steve Cropper/Wilson Pickett)
6. "Bucket of Blood" (4:14)
7. "T.C. Song" (4:31)
8. "Girl, Cut It Out" (4:16) (w/Wanda Rash)

== Personnel ==
- Roger Troutman - guitars, talk box, vibraphone, keyboards, vocals, backing vocals
- Ricardo Bray - guitars
- Sherman Fleetwood - keyboards
- Billy Beck, Greg Jackson - keyboards, backing vocals
- Zapp Troutman - bass, keyboards, backing vocals
- Lester Troutman - drums, percussion
- Bart Thomas, Bobby Glover, Jannetta Boyce, Larry Hatcher, Mallia Franklin, Mark Thomas, Michael Jennings, Mighty Clouds of Joy, The, Ray Davis, Shelley Smith, Shirley Murdock, Tim Abrams, Varges Thomas, Wanda Rash - backing vocals
- Carl Cowen, Jerome Derrickson, Larry Hatcher, Maceo Parker, Michael Jennings, Michael Warren - horns
