= Bridging the Gap =

Bridging the Gap may refer to:

- Bridging the Gap (Black Eyed Peas album), 2000
- Bridging the Gap (Charlie Wilson album), 2000
- Bridging the Gap (Roger Troutman album), 1991
- "Bridging the Gap" (song), by Nas, 2004

== See also ==
- Bridging a Gap, a 1972 album by Mark Murphy
