= A Woman's Point of View =

Studio album by Shirley Murdock
- Released: May 31, 1988
- Recorded: 1987–1988
- Genre: Soul
- Length: 54:24
- Label: Elektra
- Producer: Roger Troutman

Shirley Murdock chronology
Shirley Murdock! (1986)	A Woman's Point of View (1988)	Let There Be Love! (1991)

A Woman's Point of View is a studio album by the American soul singer Shirley Murdock. The album was released on May 31, 1988, and includes the charting single "Husband".

== Critical reception ==
Professional ratings
Review scores
Source	Rating
AllMusic	3/5 stars

The Washington Post wrote that "Murdock gives her melodramatically powerful voice free rein, and it sobs and soars in a sonic stratosphere somewhere between Aretha Franklin and Jennifer Holliday."

== Track listing ==
Side one
No.	Title	Writer(s)	Length
1.	"Husband"	Billy Beck; Larry Troutman	5:05
2.	"(Everybody Wants) Somethin' for Nothin'"	Shirley Murdock	4:30
3.	"Found My Way"	Billy Beck; Larry Troutman	5:57
4.	"If I Know"	Roger; Larry Troutman	5:03
5.	"A Woman's Point of View"	Shirley Murdock; Roger; Larry Troutman	4:05

Side two
No.	Title	Writer(s)	Length
1.	"Oh What a Feeling"	Roger; Larry Troutman	5:23
2.	"I Still Love You"	Shirley Murdock	5:15
3.	"Spend My Whole Life" (featuring Dale Degroat)	Billy Beck; Roger; Larry Troutman	5:42
4.	"Modern Girl"	Billy Beck; Roger; Larry Troutman	3:48
5.	"And I Am Telling You I'm Not Going"	Tom Eyen; Henry Krieger	4:32
6.	"Instrument of Praise"	Dale Degroat; Shirley Murdock	5:42

== Personnel ==
- Shirley Murdock – lead vocals, backing vocals (1, 3, 4, 8, 9, 11), all backing vocals (2, 5–7), arrangements (2, 5, 7, 8, 10, 11)
- Billy Beck – keyboards, backing vocals (1, 3, 4, 8, 9, 11), arrangements (1, 3, 9)
- Dale DeGroat – keyboards, synthesizers, drums, backing vocals (1, 3, 4, 8, 9, 11), lead vocals (8), arrangements (8, 11)
- Sherman Fleetwood – keyboards, synthesizers
- Roger Troutman – keyboards, synthesizers, lead guitars (1, 3–6, 8–10), rhythm guitars (1, 3–6, 8–10), bass, congas, backing vocals (1, 3, 4, 8, 9, 11), arrangements (4–6, 9, 10)
- Terry "Zapp" Troutman – keyboards, synthesizers, bass
- Aaron Blackmon – bass, lead guitars (2, 7), rhythm guitars (2, 7)
- Lester Troutman – drums, congas
- Johnny Lytle – vibraphone
- Carl Cowen – all horns
- Larry Troutman – arrangements (1, 3–6, 9)
- Nicole Cottom – backing vocals (1, 3, 4, 8, 9, 11)
- Roger Lynch – backing vocals (1, 3, 4, 8, 9, 11)
- Dick Smith – backing vocals (1, 3, 4, 8, 9, 11)
- Rhonda Stevens – backing vocals (1, 3, 4, 8, 9, 11)
- David Thomas – backing vocals (1, 3, 4, 8, 9, 11)

Production

- Roger Troutman – producer
- Aaron Blackmon – co-producer (2, 7)
- Shirley Murdock – co-producer (2, 7, 11)
- Dale DeGroat – co-producer (11)
- Carol Bobolts – cover design
- Sharon Alouf – photography
- Danny Hammond – hair stylist
- Theresa Franklin – manicurist
- Pascal – make-up artist
- Stephanie Bayless – clothing stylist

Technical credits

- Herb Powers – mastering at Frankford/Wayne Mastering Labs (New York City, New York)
- Sherman Fleetwood – recording, mixing, editing
- Lester Troutman – recording, mixing, editing
- Terry "Zapp" Troutman – recording, mixing, editing
- Roger Troutman – mixing, editing
