= Slow and Easy (disambiguation) =

Slow and Easy may refer to:

- "Slow and Easy", a song by Zapp & Roger from their album All the Greatest Hits.
- "Slow and Easy", a song by Joe Satriani from his album Engines of Creation
- "Slow an' Easy", a song by Whitesnake from their album Slide It In
