= Feel the Music (Dayton album) =

Studio album by Dayton
- Released: August 26, 1983
- Genres: Funk; post-disco; electro
- Label: Capitol
- Producer: Rahni Harris

Dayton chronology
Hot Fun (1982)	Feel the Music (1983)	This Time (1985)

Professional ratings
Review scores
Source	Rating
AllMusic	4/5 stars

Feel the Music is the fourth studio album by American funk band Dayton.

== Track listing ==
Credits adapted from the album's original liner notes.

No.	Title	Writer(s)	Producer(s)	Length
1.	"The Sound of Music"	Rahni Harris Jr.; Shawn Sandridge	Rahni Harris Jr.; Shawn Sandridge (a); Debbie Sandridge (c)	5:38
2.	"It Must Be Love"	R. Harris Jr.; Debbie Sandridge	R. Harris Jr.; S. Sandridge (a); D. Sandridge (c)	4:04
3.	"Out Tonight"	S. Sandridge; D. Sandridge; R. Harris Jr.	R. Harris Jr.; S. Sandridge (a); D. Sandridge (c)	4:56
4.	"So What"	R. Harris Jr.	R. Harris Jr.; S. Sandridge (a); D. Sandridge (c)	4:57
5.	"Love You Anyway"	Roger Troutman; Larry Troutman	Roger Troutman	4:25
6.	"Caught in the Middle"	D. Sandridge; R. Harris Jr.	R. Harris Jr.; S. Sandridge (a); D. Sandridge (c)	4:40
7.	"Eyes"	R. Harris Jr.	R. Harris Jr.; S. Sandridge (a); D. Sandridge (c)	4:11
8.	"Promise Me"	R. Harris Jr.; Karen Harris Chappell; Cecil Powell; Rachel Beavers	R. Harris Jr.; S. Sandridge (a); D. Sandridge (c)	4:02
9.	"Lookin' Up"	K. Harris Chappell; R. Harris Jr.	R. Harris Jr.; S. Sandridge (a); D. Sandridge (c)	3:54
Total length:				40:47

Notes

- a = associate producer
- c = production coordinator

== Personnel ==
Leader

- Music and vocals arranged by Rahni Harris Jr.

Dayton

- Rachel Beavers – background vocals
- Rahni Harris Jr. – lead vocals (2, 4–7), rhythm guitar (3), background vocals, vocoder, steel drums, vibes, wind chimes, Hammond B-3 organ, Clavinet, Fender Rhodes piano, OB-X, Prophet-5, various synthesizers
- Karen Harris Chappell – lead vocals (8, 9), background vocals
- Kevin Hurt – drums (1–7, 9), percussion
- Chris Jones – lead vocals (3), background vocals, percussion
- Shawn Sandridge – lead vocals (1), lead guitar (1–3, 6–9), rhythm guitar (1, 2, 6–9), background vocals, Moog synthesizer, OB-X

Additional musicians

- Billy Beck – background vocals
- Wes Boatman – Prophet-5
- Bobby Glover – background vocals
- Zachary Harris – drums (8)
- Larry Hatcher – background vocals
- Terri Sandridge – background vocals
- Doug Simon – guitar (4)
- Otha Stokes – saxophone
- Larry Troutman – congas, percussion (5)
- Lester Troutman – guest drums (5)
- Roger Troutman – lead and rhythm guitars, keyboards, bass, background vocals (5)
- Terry "Zapp" Troutman – guest bass guitar (5)
- Scott A. White III – background vocals
- Doug Wimbish – bass guitar (1–4, 6–9)
