= Zapp V =

Zapp Vibe

Studio album by Zapp
- Released: September 9, 1989
- Recorded: 1988–1989
- Genres: Funk, Soul, R&B, New jack swing
- Length: 44:35
- Label: Reprise
- Producer: Roger Troutman

Zapp chronology
The New Zapp IV U (1985)	Zapp Vibe (1989)	All the Greatest Hits (1993)

Zapp V (aka Zapp Vibe) is the fifth studio album by Ohio Funk band Zapp.

Zapp Vibe became the last full-length album to include frontman Roger Troutman and brother Larry Troutman before their deaths in 1999.

The next full-length album to be released by the band would be in 2002 entitled Zapp VI: Back by Popular Demand.

== Track listing ==
No.	Title	Writer(s)	Length
1.	"Ooh Baby Baby"	Smokey Robinson, Pete Moore	3:38
2.	"I Play the Talk Box"		4:23
3.	"Stop That"		3:59
4.	"Fire"	Billy Beck, Leroy "Sugarfoot" Bonner, Marshall "Rock" Jones, Ralph "Pee Wee" Middlebrooks, Marvin "Merv" Pierce, Clarence "Satch" Satchell, James "Diamond" Williams	3:38
5.	"Been This Way Before"		3:58
6.	"Back to Bass-iks"		4:51
7.	"Jesse Jackson"		4:56
8.	"Ain't the Thing to Do"		3:45
9.	"Sad-Day Moaning"		3:49
10.	"Rock Star"		4:01
11.	"Jake E Stanstill"		3:37

== Charts ==
Chart (1989–1990)	Peak position
US Billboard 200	154
US Top R&B/Hip-Hop Albums (Billboard)	34
