= Bridging the Gap (Roger Troutman album) =

Studio album by Roger
- Released: October 29, 1991
- Studio: Troutman Sound Labs
- Genre: Funk; electro; R&B
- Length: 53:35
- Label: Reprise
- Producer: Roger Troutman, David Gamson

Roger chronology
Unlimited! (1987)	Bridging the Gap (1991)

Bridging the Gap is the fourth and final solo studio album by American musician Roger Troutman. It was released on October 29, 1991, via Reprise Records. The album was produced by David Gamson and Troutman.

== Critical reception ==
Professional ratings
Review scores
Source	Rating
AllMusic	2/5 stars
The Indianapolis Star	2.5/4 stars

The Indianapolis Star wrote: "Variations on Roger's fourth solo disc are interesting but mostly unoriginal, saluting Zapp's roots in the P-Funk movement."

== Track listing ==
No.	Title	Writer(s)	Producer(s)	Length
1.	"(Everybody) Get Up"	Roger Troutman; David Gamson	Roger Troutman; David Gamson; Sir Jinx (add.)	4:38
2.	"Take Me Back"	R. Troutman; Gamson	Roger Troutman; Gamson	5:33
3.	"Curiosity"	R. Troutman	Roger Troutman	6:40
4.	"You Should Be Mine"	R. Troutman; Gamson	Roger Troutman; Gamson	6:01
5.	"Emotions"	R. Troutman; Gamson	Roger Troutman; Gamson	6:09
6.	"Break Through"	R. Troutman; Gamson	Roger Troutman; Gamson	5:23
7.	"Love Incorporated"	R. Troutman	Roger Troutman	4:52
8.	"Victim of Love"	R. Troutman	Roger Troutman	5:59
9.	"Who-La-Boola"	R. Troutman	Roger Troutman	4:37
10.	"Hurry Up"	R. Troutman; Larry Troutman	Roger Troutman	3:38
Total length:				53:35

== Personnel ==
- Roger Troutman – lead vocals, backing vocals, talkbox, keyboards, synthesizer, lead guitar, rhythm guitar, bass, drum programming, editing, mixing, recording, arrangement, producer
- Dale DeGroat – backing vocals, keyboards, synthesizer, editing, engineering
- Terry Troutman – backing vocals, keyboards, editing, engineering
- Sherman Fleetwood – backing vocals, engineering
- Dick Smith – backing vocals
- Nicole Cottom – backing vocals
- Otis Stokes – backing vocals
- Rocque LaCrosby – backing vocals
- Shirley Murdock – backing vocals
- David Gamson – keyboards, synthesizer, bass, drum programming, recording, arrangement, producer (tracks: 1–2, 4–6)
- Lester Troutman – percussion, drum programming, editing, mixing, engineering
- Paulinho da Costa – percussion
- Tony Alvarez – drum programming
- Carl Cowen – horns
- Robert Smith – engineering
- Rufus Troutman III – engineering
- Anthony "Sir Jinx" Wheaton – additional co-producer (track 1)
- Larry Troutman – arrangement (track 10)
- John Potoker – mixing (track 1)
- Goh Hotoda – mixing (tracks: 2, 4, 6)
- Warren Woods – additional recording (track 1)
- Ryan Dorn – additional recording (track 6)
- Steve Hall – mastering
- Kevin Hosmann – art direction
- Alan Snow – photography
- Marsha Burns – coordinator
- Benny Medina – executive producer

== Charts ==
Chart (1991)	Peak position
US Top R&B/Hip-Hop Albums (Billboard)	45
