= Hot Fun =

Studio album by Dayton
- Released: June 28, 1982
- Recorded: 1981–1982
- Genre: Post-disco; urban
- Length: 37:45
- Label: Capitol
- Producer: Rahni Harris; Shawn Sandridge; Ted Currier

Dayton chronology
Cutie Pie (1981)	Hot Fun (1982)	Feel The Music (1983)

Hot Fun is the 3rd studio album by American funk band Dayton. It was released on June 28, 1982, by Capitol Records. The album was subdued but well received by Billboard critics for its cool skating and step-by-step rhythm and was set amidst some jazzy riffs and ensemble vocals, as well as the rest of the album with its upbeat manner and mixed male and female voices. The group moved from their previous label, Liberty to Capitol Records. Besides, the album features "Krackity Krack" with another Dayton native, Bootsy Collins, and the funk and jazzy "Movin' Up". Other major hits include the bouncy and funky “We Can't Miss”, the danceable single “Meet The Man”, the funky tune of "Gunch" and the slow jam "Patiently".

== Track listing ==
1. "Hot Fun in the Summertime" (5:21)
2. "We Can't-Miss" (4:46)
3. "Patiently" (5:31)
4. "Krackity Krack" (5:33)
5. "Meet The Man" (5:51)
6. "Gunch" (5:18)
7. "Never Repay Your Love" (4:39)
8. "Movin' Up" (4:59)
9. "Movin' Up (reprise)" (0:40)
