= Sun Power =

Studio album by Sun
- Released: 1977
- Recorded: 1977
- Genre: Funk R&B
- Label: Capitol Records
- Producer: Ray Fleming

Sun chronology
Wanna Make Love (1976)	Sun Power (1977)	Sunburn (1978)

Sun Power is the second album by Dayton, Ohio funk band Sun

Professional ratings
Review scores
Source	Rating
Allmusic	3/5 stars

== Track listing ==
1. Light Me Up 4:07
2. Boogie Bopper 3:20
3. We're So Hot 4:28
4. Conscience 4:41
5. Time Is Passing 7:11
6. Just A Minute Of Your Time 3:11
7. Organ Grinder 3:53
8. She Lives Alone 5:29

== Personnel ==
- Byron Byrd - Lead and Backing Vocals, Bass, Trombone, Alto, Baritone and Soporano Saxophone
- Chris Jones - Lead and Backing Vocals, Cornet, Percussion, Trumpet, Vibraphone
- Dean Hummons - Flute, Keyboards, Organ, Piano, Backing Vocals
- Kym Yancey - Drums, Percussion, Backing Vocals
- John Wagner - Lead and Backing Vocals, Flugelhorn, Percussion, Piano, Trombone, Trumpet
- Shawn Sandridge - Lead and Backing Vocals, Electric Guitar, Keyboards
- Gary King - Percussion, Trombone, Backing Vocals

== Charts ==
Chart (1977)	Peak position
Billboard Top Soul Albums	39

=== Singles ===
Year	Single	Chart positions
Year	Single	US R&B
1977	"Boogie Bopper"	50
