= Sunburn (Sun album) =

Studio album by Sun
- Released: 1978
- Recorded: 1978 at Cyberteknics Recording Studio, Dayton, Ohio
- Genre: Funk R&B
- Label: Capitol Records
- Producer: Byron Byrd & Beau Ray Fleming

Sun chronology
Sun Power (1977)	Sunburn (1978)	Destination Sun (1979)

Sunburn is the third album by Dayton, Ohio funk band Sun.

Professional ratings
Review scores
Source	Rating
Allmusic	3/5 stars

== Track listing ==
1. Introduction: You Are My Sunshine 0:15
2. Sun Is Here 5:02
3. Dance (Do What You Wanna Do) 6:05
4. When You Put Your Hand In Mine 5:54
5. You're The One 4:18
6. Long Drawn Out Thang 6:16
7. You Don't Have To Hurry 5:11
8. I Had A Choice 4:37
9. Sun Of A Gun 4:54

== Personnel ==
- Byron Byrd - Lead and Backing Vocals, Bass, Piano, Keyboards, Percussion, Flute, Trombone, Alto, Baritone and Soporano Saxophone
- Kym Yancey - Drums, Percussion, Backing Vocals
- Sonnie Talbert - Organ, Clavinet, Synthesizer, Keyboards, Guitar, Backing Vocals
- Keith Cheatham - Lead and Backing Vocals, Lead Guitar, Trombone, Percussion
- Ernie Knisley - Congas, Percussion, Trumpet, Baritone Saxophone, Backing Vocals
- Curtis Hooks - Bass, Alto Saxophone, Lead and Backing Vocals
- Gary King - Trombone, Backing Vocals
- Robert Arnold - Trumpet, Backing Vocals
- Nigel Boulton - Trumpet, Flugelhorn, Piano, Backing Vocals

== Charts ==
Chart (1978)	Peak position
Billboard Pop Albums	69
Billboard Top Soul Albums	21

=== Singles ===
Year	Single	Chart positions
Year	Single	US R&B
1978	"Sun Is Here"	18
1978	"Dance (Do What You Wanna Do)"	92
