= Slow and Easy =

1993 single by Zapp & Roger

Single by Zapp & Roger

from the album All the Greatest Hits
- B-side: "A Chunk of Sugar"
- Released: October 21, 1993
- Recorded: 1993
- Genre: R&B, new jack swing
- Length: 5:11
- Label: Reprise
- Songwriters: Shirley Murdock; Roger Troutman; Larry Troutman
- Producer: Roger Troutman

Zapp & Roger singles chronology
"Mega Medley" (1993)	"Slow and Easy" (1993)	"Living for the City" (1996)

"Slow and Easy" is a song performed by American rhythm and blues band Zapp (then credited as Zapp & Roger), issued as the second and final single from their first greatest hits album All the Greatest Hits. It was written by Roger Troutman, Larry Troutman and Shirley Murdock; and was produced by Roger. The song is the band's highest chart appearance to date on the Billboard Hot 100, peaking at #43 in 1993.

== Chart positions ==
Chart (1993)	Peak position
US Billboard Hot 100	43
US Hot R&B Singles (Billboard)	18
US Rhythmic Top 40 (Billboard)	15
