= Destination Sun =

Destination: Sun

Studio album by Sun
- Released: 1979
- Recorded: 1979 at Cyberteknics Recording Studio, Dayton, Ohio
- Genre: Funk R&B
- Label: Capitol Records
- Producer: Byron Byrd & Beau Ray Fleming

Sun chronology
Sunburn (1978)	Destination: Sun (1979)	Sun Over the Universe (1980)

Destination: Sun is the fourth album by Dayton, Ohio funk band Sun

Professional ratings
Review scores
Source	Rating
Allmusic	3/5 stars

== Track listing ==
1. Radiation Level 5:55
2. Pure Fire 5:08
3. I Want To Be With You 4:47
4. Everybody Disco Down 3:32
5. Light Of The Universe 4:52
6. Deep Rooted Feeling (Stand Up) 4:58
7. Baby I Confess 4:02
8. Hallelujah Spirit 4:43

== Personnel ==
- Byron Byrd - Lead and Backing Vocals, Bass, Piano, Keyboards, Percussion, Flute, Trombone, Alto, Baritone and Soporano Saxophone
- Kym Yancey - Drums, Percussion, Backing Vocals
- Keith Cheatham - Lead and Backing Vocals, Lead Guitar, Trombone, Percussion
- Curtis Hooks - Bass, Alto Saxophone, Lead and Backing Vocals
- Gary King - Trombone, Backing Vocals
- Robert Arnold - Trumpet, Backing Vocals
- Nigel Boulton - Trumpet, Flugelhorn, Piano, Backing Vocals

== Production ==
- Shusei Nagaoka - cover art

== Charts ==
Chart (1979)	Peak position
Billboard Pop Albums	85
Billboard Top Soul Albums	17

=== Singles ===
Year	Single	Chart positions
Year	Single	US R&B
1979	"Pure Fire"	67
1979	"Radiation Level"	25
