= Tonight's da Night =

Single by Redman

from the album Whut? Thee Album
- Released: May 4, 1993
- Recorded: 1992
- Genre: East Coast hip hop; hardcore hip hop
- Length: 3:22
- Label: Def Jam
- Songwriter(s): Reggie Noble; J. Stone; Rick James
- Producer(s): Erick Sermon; Reggie Noble (co.)

Redman singles chronology
"Time 4 Sum Aksion" (1993)	"Tonight's da Night" (1993)	"Rockafella" (1994)

"Tonight's da Night" is the third single released by Redman from his debut album, Whut? Thee Album. It features a jazzy beat produced by Erick Sermon and Redman himself, and contains samples from many songs, including "All Night Long" by Mary Jane Girls, "The Payback" by James Brown, "Tonight's the Night" by Raydio, and "A Few More Kisses to Go" by Isaac Hayes. The song starts off with Redman rapping about being "smooth to any groove", and he is then interrupted by Hurricane G who wants him to rap some "rough shit". Redman goes on to talk about guns and other illegal things. A remix can be found on Redman's second album, Dare Iz a Darkside.

It is a popular song within hip hop and was name-dropped on Common's song "Sum Shit I Wrote". Common also sampled some of its lyrics for the chorus of "Soul by the Pound" (Thump Mix). Some of its lyrics are parodied on "Clockwork" by Dilated Peoples. The line "I'm after the gold and after that the platinum" was sampled in the hook for the song "What I'm After" by fellow New Jersey natives Lords of the Underground. It has been featured on many compilations including Hip Hop Forever, Def Jam's Greatest Hits: Hardcore and Da Undaground Sound, Vol. 1: East Side.

MC Eiht's song "One Less Nigga" mentions this at one point when the line "Tonights the night, like Redman" is recited.

Harlem rapper Party Arty in the song "Da Graveyard", on Big L's first album Lifestylez Ov Da Poor & Dangerous, says "so mess around you'll be a dead man/ I get hype, tonight's the night like Redman".

== Track listing ==
A-side

1. "Tonight's da Night" (LP version) –3:22
2. "Tonight's da Night" (instrumental) –3:05

B-side

1. "I'm a Bad" –2:53
2. "Rated 'R'" –3:22

== Charts ==
Chart (1993)	Peak position
US Hot R&B/Hip-Hop Songs (Billboard)	78
US R&B/Hip-Hop Airplay (Billboard)	60
US Hot Rap Songs (Billboard)	20
