= Be Alright (Zapp song) =

1981 single by Zapp

Single by Zapp

from the album Zapp
- Released: November 1980
- Recorded: 1980
- Genre: R&B, funk
- Length: 2:43 (single version); 7:52 (album version)
- Label: Warner Bros.
- Songwriter(s): Roger Troutman; Larry Troutman
- Producer(s): Roger Troutman; Bootsy Collins

Zapp singles chronology
"More Bounce to the Ounce" (1980)	"Be Alright" (1980)	"Doo Wa Ditty (Blow That Thing)/A Touch of Jazz (Playin' Kinda Ruff Part II)" (1982)

"Be Alright" is a song performed by the American funk band Zapp. The song was written, arranged, composed, performed and produced by Roger Troutman.

It was issued as the second and final single from the band's eponymous debut album. The song peaked at No. 26 on the Billboard R&B chart in 1981.

== Chart positions ==
Chart (1981)	Peak position
US R&B Singles (Billboard)	26

== Samples ==
- The beat of "Be Alright" is sampled in the H-Town song "Knockin' da Boots" and the 2Pac song "Keep Ya Head Up".
