= In the Midnight Hour =

1965 single by Wilson Pickett

Single by Wilson Pickett

from the album In the Midnight Hour
- B-side: "I'm Not Tired"
- Released: June 1965
- Recorded: May 12, 1965
- Studio: Stax, Memphis, Tennessee
- Genre: R&B; soul
- Length: 2:35
- Label: Atlantic
- Songwriters: Wilson Pickett; Steve Cropper
- Producers: Jim Stewart; Steve Cropper

Wilson Pickett singles chronology
"Come Home Baby" (1964)	"In the Midnight Hour" (1965)	"Don't Fight It" (1965)

"In the Midnight Hour" is a song originally performed by American singer Wilson Pickett in 1965 and released on his 1965 album of the same name, also appearing on the 1966 album The Exciting Wilson Pickett. The song was composed by Pickett and Steve Cropper at the historic Lorraine Motel in Memphis, later (April 1968) the site of the assassination of Martin Luther King Jr. Pickett's first hit on Atlantic Records, it reached number one on the R&B charts and peaked at number 21 on the pop charts.

== Composition and recording ==
Wilson Pickett recorded "In the Midnight Hour" at Stax Studios, Memphis, May 12, 1965. The song's co-writer Steve Cropper recalls: "[Atlantic Records president] Jerry Wexler said he was going to bring down this great singer Wilson Pickett to record at Stax Studio (where Cropper was a session guitarist) and I didn’t know what groups he'd been in or whatever. But I used to work in [a] record shop, and I found some gospel songs that Wilson Pickett had sung on. On a couple [at] the end, he goes: 'I'll see my Jesus in the midnight hour! Oh, in the midnight hour. I'll see my Jesus in the midnight hour.'", and Cropper got the idea of using the phrase "in the midnight hour" as the basis for an R&B song. More likely, Cropper was remembering The Falcons' 1962 song "I Found a Love," on which Pickett sings lead and says "And sometimes I call in the midnight hour!" The only gospel record Pickett had appeared on before this was the Violinaires' "Sign of the Judgement," which includes no such phrase.

Besides Cropper, the band on "In the Midnight Hour" featured Stax session regulars Al Jackson (drums) and Donald "Duck" Dunn (bass). According to Cropper, "Wexler was responsible for the track's innovative delayed backbeat", as Cropper revamped his planned groove for "In the Midnight Hour" based on a dance step called the Jerk, which Wexler demonstrated in the studio. According to Cropper, "this was the way the kids were dancing; they were putting the accent on two. Basically, we'd been one-beat-accenters with an afterbeat; it was like 'boom dah,' but here was a thing that went 'um-chaw,' just the reverse as far as the accent goes."

Pickett re-recorded the song for his 1987 album American Soul Man.

== Reception and recognition ==
"In the Midnight Hour" reached number one on the R&B chart in Billboard magazine dated August 7, 1965, and crossed over to the Top 40 of the Billboard Hot 100 reaching number 21: however according to Stax owner Jim Stewart the domestic sales total of the single in its original release was a moderate 300,000 units. One of the reasons why the song failed to crack the top 20 was that the song's title was too suggestive of sexuality in the after hours.

"In the Midnight Hour" by Wilson Pickett placed at number 134 on Rolling Stone's list of the 500 Greatest Songs of All Time, It is also one of The Rock and Roll Hall of Fame's 500 Songs that Shaped Rock and Roll. In 2017, the song was selected for preservation in the National Recording Registry by the Library of Congress as being "culturally, historically, or aesthetically significant". In 1999, "In the Midnight Hour" recorded in 1965 on Atlantic Records by Pickett was inducted into the Grammy Hall of Fame.

== Personnel ==
The following musicians played on the session for "In the Midnight Hour".

- Wilson Pickett – vocals
- Joe Hall – piano
- Steve Cropper – guitar
- Donald "Duck" Dunn – bass guitar
- Al Jackson Jr. – drums
- Wayne Jackson – trumpet
- Andrew Love – tenor saxophone
- Charles "Packy" Axton – tenor saxophone
- Floyd Newman – baritone saxophone

== Certifications ==
Region	Certification	Certified units/sales
New Zealand (RMNZ)	Gold	15,000^{‡}
United Kingdom (BPI)	Silver	200,000^{‡}
^{‡} Sales+streaming figures based on certification alone.

== Cover versions ==
- The song has been an intermittent inclusion in Bruce Springsteen's live setlists, beginning in 1969. A notable performance took place in the minutes preceding midnight during the December 31, 1980, performance at the Nassau Coliseum by Springsteen and his E Street Band on The River Tour. The show was later released as part of the official Springsteen Live Archives and is regarded by many Springsteen fans as one of the marquee concerts of his career. Another broadcast performance took place on the evening of Springsteen's induction to the Rock and Roll Hall of Fame at the Waldorf-Astoria Hotel on New York City on March 15, 1999, as a duet with Pickett. Springsteen's most recent performance of the song in a public forum took place at Deeridge Farm in Wellington, Florida, on January 17, 2020.
- Australian band Ray Brown & the Whispers recorded a local cover of the Wilson Pickett hit, and were afforded a number four Australian hit in 1965.
- The Grateful Dead regularly performed the song in concert from 1965 to 1971 and again from 1982 to 1994. Earlier versions of the song could reach up to 30 minutes in length, as heard on Fallout from the Phil Zone.
- The American garage rock/psychedelic rock band The Chocolate Watchband released a version on their 1967 album No Way Out. It did not chart but was released as a reissued single by Sundazed Music in 2012.
- The Mirettes had a top 20 R&B hit with their version of "In the Midnight Hour" which reached number 18 on the Billboard R&B chart in March 1968, and number 45 on the Billboard Hot 100. The song also charted at number 18 on the Cash Box R&B chart and number 52 the Cash Box Top 100.
- The Young Rascals recorded the song in 1966. It was featured on the Rascals' greatest-hits album, Time Peace (1968).
- Cross Country, which consisted of three members of the Tokens quartet, recorded a ballad version of "In the Midnight Hour" for the group's sole album release which was entitled Cross Country and otherwise consisted of original material: group member Jay Siegel states that Cross Country re-invented "In the Midnight Hour" taking as prototype the recordings of Crosby Stills and Nash. Issued as a single in July 1973, "In the Midnight Hour" debuted at number 100 on the Hot 100 in Billboard magazine dated August 18, 1973, rising to a peak of number 30 in October 1973: the Cashbox Top 100 Singles chart ranked "In the Midnight Hour" by Cross Country as high as number 18 besting the number 22 peak afforded to the Wilson Pickett original by the Cash Box Top 100 Singles chart. "In the Midnight Hour" by Cross Country also ranked on the Billboard Easy Listening chart with a number six peak, and was a moderate hit in Canada with an RPM100 peak of number 34, also charting in Australia (number 63).
- British mod/punk band The Jam covered the song as the closing track of their second album, This Is the Modern World, in 1977.
- Australian artist Samantha Sang remade "In the Midnight Hour" for her 1979 album From Dance to Love from which it was issued as the second single: reaching number 88, the track would mark her third and final Hot 100 appearance.
- The English rock band Roxy Music remade "In the Midnight Hour" for their 1980 Flesh and Blood album with the track issued as a single in the US where it bubbled under the Billboard Hot 100 reaching No. 106: the track was also issued as a single in Portugal.
- Genesis regularly performed an excerpt of the song in concert, as part of the "Turn It On Again" medley, in the 1980s: two different live recordings appear respectively in Turn It On Again - Best of '81 - '83 and Knebworth – The Album.
- "In the Midnight Hour" became a C&W hit in 1984 via a remake by Razzy Bailey which reached number 14 C&W. The single was taken from Bailey's The Midnight Hour album recorded in 1983 at producer Bob Montgomery's Soundshop Studio, Nashville. (Bailey followed up "In the Midnight Hour" with another Steve Cropper co-write "Knock on Wood".)
- American musician Roger had an R&B hit with his remake entitled "Midnight Hour (Part 1)" which reached number 34 R&B in 1984: the single was taken from the album The Saga Continues...
- The Chambers Brothers with brother Willie singing lead included the song on their 1967 debut album on Columbia RecordsThe Time Has Come.
- For the album Solid Rock Revival, Alice Cooper and Darryl McDaniels recorded a hip hop version called "Midday Hour".
