= Dance Floor (song) =

Single by Zapp

from the album Zapp II
- Released: 1982
- Genre: R&B, funk
- Length: 11:09 (album version); 3:55 (short version)
- Label: Warner Bros.
- Songwriter(s): Roger Troutman; Larry Troutman
- Producer(s): Roger Troutman

Zapp singles chronology
"Doo Wa Ditty (Blow That Thing)/A Touch of Jazz (Playin' Kinda Ruff Part II)" (1982)	"Dance Floor" (1982)	"Playin' Kinda Ruff" / "Do You Really Want an Answer?" (1982)

"Dance Floor" is a song performed by American funk band Zapp, issued as the second single from their second studio album Zapp II. The song spent two weeks at No. 1 on the Billboard R&B singles chart.

== Track listing ==
- 12" single

Side A
No.	Title	Length
1.	"Dance Floor" (Long version)	11:09

Side B
No.	Title	Length
1.	"Dance Floor" (Short version)	3:55

== Chart positions ==
Chart (1982)	Peak position
US Dance Music/Club Play Singles (Billboard)	62
US R&B Singles (Billboard)	1
