= The New Zapp IV U =

Studio album by Zapp
- Released: October 25, 1985
- Recorded: 1985
- Studio: Troutman Sound Labs
- Genre: Funk
- Length: 43:03
- Label: Warner Bros.
- Producer: Roger Troutman

Zapp chronology
Zapp III (1983)	The New Zapp IV U (1985)	Zapp Vibe (1989)

Singles from Zapp II
- 1. "Computer Love" Released: 1986

The New Zapp IV U is the fourth studio album by the American funk band Zapp, released on October 25, 1985, by Warner Bros. Records. The album contained the song "Computer Love", which reached No. 8 on the US Billboard R&B chart. The album became the last release before frontman Roger Troutman would focus his efforts on his solo career; their next album, titled Zapp Vibe, would be released in 1989.

== Critical reception ==
Professional ratings
Review scores
Source	Rating
AllMusic	3/5 stars

Jason Birchmeier of AllMusic gave the album a positive review: "The previous three Zapp albums were all stellar, and it would have been a shame for him to abandon a winning formula. In the end, the new approach to songwriting here proves just enough change to make this a fresh-sounding album".

== In popular culture ==
The song "Radio People" was featured in the movie Ferris Bueller's Day Off. The album's most popular single, "Computer Love", was also featured in the 1993 movie Menace II Society.

== Track listing ==
No.	Title	Length
1.	"It Doesn't Really Matter"	5:28
2.	"Computer Love"	4:51
3.	"Itchin' for Your Twitchin'"	4:05
4.	"Radio People"	5:55
5.	"I Only Have Eyes for You"	4:45
6.	"Rock 'n' Roll"	4:51
7.	"Cas-Ta-Spellome"	3:33
8.	"Make Me Feel Good"	5:17
9.	"Ja Ready to Rock"	4:18

== Personnel ==
- Roger Troutman: Rhythm and Lead Guitars, Bass, Keyboards, Vocals
- Aaron Blackmon: Rhythm and Lead Guitars, Bass
- Greg Jackson, Dale DeGroat, Billy Beck, Bernie Worrell: Keyboards
- Zapp Troutman: Bass, Keyboards
- Damian Black: Drums
- Lester Troutman: Drums, Percussion
- Larry Troutman, Robert "Kurumba" Jones: Percussion
- Carl Cowen, Jerome Derrickson, Michael Warren, Robert Jones: Horns
- Shirley Murdock – backing vocals (2)
- Charlie Wilson – backing vocals (2)

== Charts ==
=== Weekly charts ===
Chart (1985–1986)	Peak position
US Billboard 200	110
US Top R&B/Hip-Hop Albums (Billboard)	8

=== Year-end charts ===
Chart (1986)	Position
US Top R&B/Hip-Hop Albums (Billboard)	28
