= Zapp III =

Studio album by Zapp
- Released: July 25, 1983
- Recorded: 1982–1983
- Genre: Funk
- Length: 37:41
- Label: Warner Bros.
- Producers: Roger Troutman; Billy Beck

Zapp chronology
| Zapp II (1982) | Zapp III (1983) | The New Zapp IV U (1985) |

Professional ratings
Review scores
| Source | Rating |
|---|---|
| AllMusic | 2.5/5 stars |

Zapp III is the third studio album by the American funk band Zapp. It was released on July 25, 1983, by Warner Bros. Records.

== In popular culture ==
"I Can Make You Dance" is featured on the fictional radio station Bounce FM in the video game Grand Theft Auto: San Andreas. "Heartbreaker" is featured on the radio station Space 103.2 in Grand Theft Auto V, and was also featured in the 1995 film Friday.

== Track listing ==
| No. | Title | Length |
|---|---|---|
| 1. | "Heartbreaker" | 7:30 |
| 2. | "I Can Make You Dance" | 9:01 |
| 3. | "Play Some Blues" | 5:45 |
| 4. | "Spend My Whole Life" | 4:07 |
| 5. | "We Need the Buck" | 5:43 |
| 6. | "Tut-Tut (Jazz)" | 5:15 |
| 7. | "Doo Wa Ditty" (live) | 1:00 |
