= The Many Facets of Roger =

Studio album by Roger
- Released: 1981
- Recorded: 1981, Detroit, Michigan
- Genre: Funk, electro funk, blues
- Length: 40:13
- Label: Warner Bros.
- Producer: Roger Troutman

Roger chronology
The Many Facets of Roger (1981)	The Saga Continues... (1984)

The Many Facets of Roger is the debut solo project by Dayton, Ohio-based funk musician Roger Troutman. The album went gold based on the R&B successes of "So Ruff, So Tuff" and his cover of Marvin Gaye's "I Heard It through the Grapevine". In the album, Troutman featured two instrumentals, "A Chunk of Sugar" and "Blue (A Tribute to the Blues)", which was recorded inside Detroit's United Sound Studios.

In 2002 the album was re-released with three bonus tracks: "I Heard It Through the Grapevine" (single version), "Do It Roger" (single version), and a cover of the 1969 song "Superman" by the American sunshine pop band The Clique, which Troutman recorded in 1997.

== Track listing ==
All songs were written and composed by Roger and Larry Troutman unless otherwise noted.

Side A

1. "I Heard It Through the Grapevine" (10:45) (Norman Whitfield, Barrett Strong)
2. "So Ruff, So Tuff" (4:49)
3. "A Chunk of Sugar" (5:28)

Side B

1. "Do It Roger" (8:11)
2. "Maxx Axe" (8:16)
3. "Blue (A Tribute to the Blues)" (3:24)

== Personnel ==
- Dick Smith: Main and Backing Vocals
- Bobby Glover, Delores Smith, Greg Jackson, Janetta Boyce, Marchelle Smith: Backing Vocals
- Roger Troutman: Vocals, Guitars, Guitar Synthesizer, Keyboards, Fender Rhodes, Synthesizers
- Larry Troutman: Congas, Percussion
- Bass, Backing Vocals - Zapp Troutman
- Drums - Lester Troutman
- Horns - Carl Cowen

== Charts ==
=== Weekly charts ===
Chart (1981)	Peak position
US Billboard 200	26
US Top R&B/Hip-Hop Albums (Billboard)	1

=== Year-end charts ===
Chart (1982)	Position
US Top R&B/Hip-Hop Albums (Billboard)	35
