= Computer Love (Zapp song) =

1986 single by Zapp

Single by Zapp featuring Shirley Murdock and Charlie Wilson

from the album The New Zapp IV U
- Released: 1986
- Recorded: 1985
- Genre: R&B; synth-pop; electro
- Length: 4:44
- Label: Warner Bros.
- Songwriters: Shirley Murdock; Roger Troutman; Larry Troutman
- Producer: Roger Troutman

Zapp singles chronology
"Itchin' for Your Twitchin'" (1986)	"Computer Love" (1986)	"Ooh Baby Baby" (1989)

Music video
- "Computer Love" on YouTube

"Computer Love" is a song performed by American funk band Zapp, issued as the fourth and final single from their fourth studio album The New Zapp IV U. Featuring vocals by Shirley Murdock and Charlie Wilson and written by Murdock, Zapp Band leader Roger Troutman and his brother Larry Troutman, the single peaked at number 8 on the Billboard R&B chart in 1986.

== Background ==
In an interview with Wilson, the song's idea was presented to him by Troutman, during a particular phone call around 3 am. A music video was also discussed between Roger and Charlie for the single. However, this did not come to fruition, due to opposition from the label that Wilson was signed to at the time. The fact that both singers were from rival bands played a hand in the opposition as well. However, the two maintained their close friendship, and would often perform the song together on stage.

== Chart positions ==
Chart (1986)	Peak position
US Hot Dance Music/Maxi-Singles Sales (Billboard)	13
US Hot R&B/Hip-Hop Singles & Tracks (Billboard)	8
UK Singles Chart (Official Singles Chart)	64

== Cover versions ==
In 1989, Janet Kay did a cover of this song on her third album, Sweet Surrender.

In 2024, Kamasi Washington did a cover of this song on his fifth album, Fearless Movement.

=== Samples ===
“Computer Love” has been sampled and interpolated approximately on one hundred tracks by major artists, earning the recognition as one of the most sampled tracks in popular music. Some of the songs that sampled "Computer Love" include:

• Notorious B.I.G., "Me & My Bitch" • Jay-Z, "Your Love" • Redman, "Blow Your Mind" • Mario, "Music for Love" • Fat Joe, "So Much More" • Tech N9ne, "Twisted" • Chris Brown, "Party Hard" • Lil' Kim, "Download" • Wiz Khalifa, “Something New” • Ne-Yo, "U 2 Luv" • Jeremih and 4batz, "Sick" • 2Pac, "I Get Around", and "Thug Passion”
