= More Bounce to the Ounce =

Single by Zapp

from the album Zapp
- B-side: "Freedom"
- Released: September 1980
- Recorded: 1979
- Genre: Funk; electro
- Length: 4:00 (single version); 9:25 (album version)
- Label: Warner Bros.
- Songwriter: Roger Troutman
- Producers: Bootsy Collins; Roger Troutman

Zapp singles chronology
"More Bounce to the Ounce" (1980)	"Be Alright" (1981)

"More Bounce to the Ounce" is the debut single by the American funk band Zapp. It is the opening track on their 1980 eponymous debut album and was released as its lead single. The song was written and arranged by Roger Troutman and co-produced by Troutman and Bootsy Collins. The single release peaked at No. 86 on the Billboard Hot 100 and No. 2 on the Billboard R&B chart in 1980.

The song's title was taken from a 1950s Pepsi ad campaign.

== Legacy ==
"More Bounce to the Ounce" inspired Tom Tom Club's 1981 hit "Genius of Love", itself one of the most sampled tracks of the new wave era. According to Tom Tom Club drummer Chris Frantz: "We loved ['More Bounce to the Ounce'] in part because it was played at a slower, funkier tempo by far than so many other dance tracks of the period. It was very relaxed and sexy while still maintaining a raw, hard edge."

It has been sampled on songs including "You Gots to Chill" by EPMD (1988), "Friday" by Ice Cube (1995), "Long Ago" by Mariah Carey (1995), "Going Back to Cali" by The Notorious B.I.G. (1997), and "Ain't No Future in Yo' Frontin'" by MC Breed and DFC (1991).

== Chart positions ==
Chart performance for "More Bounce to the Ounce"
Chart (1980–1981)	Peak position
US Billboard Hot 100	86
US Dance Music/Club Play Singles (Billboard)	19
US R&B Singles (Billboard)	2
