= Doo Wa Ditty (Blow That Thing)/A Touch of Jazz (Playin' Kinda Ruff Part II) =

"Doo Wa Ditty (Blow That Thing)" / "A Touch of Jazz (Playin' Kinda Ruff Part II)"

Single by Zapp

from the album Zapp II
- Released: 1982
- Genre: R&B, funk, Electro
- Length: "Doo Wa Ditty (Blow That Thing)": 4:58 "A Touch of Jazz (Playin' Kinda Ruff Part II)": 6:10
- Label: Warner Bros.
- Songwriters: Roger Troutman; Larry Troutman
- Producers: Roger Troutman; Zapp Troutman

Zapp singles chronology
"Be Alright" (1981)	"Doo Wa Ditty (Blow That Thing)" / "A Touch of Jazz (Playin' Kinda Ruff Part II)" (1982)	"Dance Floor" (1982)

"Doo Wa Ditty (Blow That Thing)" / "A Touch of Jazz (Playin' Kinda Ruff Part II)" is a single performed by Zapp, issued as the lead single from their second studio album Zapp II. "Doo Wa Ditty" is the third track on the album, while "A Touch of Jazz" is the closing track on the album. The single peaked at No. 10 on the Billboard R&B singles chart in 1982.

The song "Doo Wa Ditty (Blow That Thing)" has been sampled on "Do U Wanna Roll (Dolittle Theme)" (2001), a track by R.L., Snoop Dogg and Lil' Kim from the Dr. Dolittle 2 soundtrack.

== Chart positions ==
Chart (1982)	Peak position
US R&B Singles (Billboard)	10
