= Zapp (album) =

Studio album by Zapp
- Released: July 30, 1980
- Recorded: 1979–1980
- Studios: United Sound Systems (Detroit, Michigan)
- Genre: Electro-funk
- Length: 40:16
- Label: Warner Bros.
- Producers: Roger Troutman, Bootsy Collins

Zapp chronology
Zapp (1980)	Zapp II (1982)

Singles from Zapp
- 1. "More Bounce to the Ounce" Released: September 1980; 2. "Be Alright" Released: November 1980

Professional ratings
Review scores
Source	Rating
AllMusic	4/5 stars
Robert Christgau	C+

Zapp is the debut studio album by the American funk band Zapp released on July 30, 1980 by Warner Bros. Records. The album's style and sound bears a strong resemblance to Parliament-Funkadelic, as the band was working with Parliament-Funkadelic members Bootsy Collins and George Clinton during the album's production. Produced by front-man Roger Troutman and Collins (who also played guitar on the album), Zapp was recorded between late 1979 and early 1980 at United Sound Systems in Detroit.

Topping the US Billboard Top R&B/Hip-Hop Albums chart for 2 weeks in fall 1980 and certified gold by the Recording Industry Association of America (RIAA) that November, the album has been cited as one of the definitive albums of early 1980s electro funk, and partially influenced the creation of the G-funk sound of hip-hop music, which became popular on the West Coast of the United States during the early and mid 1990s.

== Background and recording ==
During the late 1970s, Zapp was noticed by two friends of the Troutman family, Phelps "Catfish" Collins and William Earl "Bootsy" Collins, both of whom were members of Parliament-Funkadelic since the early 1970s. Earlier, Roger Troutman and his brothers played frequently in the Ohio area, originally forming the band Roger and His Fabulous Vels in 1966.

After the two Collins musicians witnessed one of Zapp's live performances, they invited Zapp to visit Detroit's United Sound Systems, where they went on to write and record the demo for "More Bounce to the Ounce", which would later appear on the debut album. Parliament-Funkadelic front-man George Clinton encouraged the band to present the demo tape to Warner Bros. Records, which ultimately led to the band's signing to the label in early 1979.

"George Clinton just happened to step into the studio this night and he really liked this one part that we had already re-did on 'Funky Bounce'. He advised us to loop that section and put the other talk-box parts over it. At that time, this was considered a genius act, because you had to actually cut the tape and make the right cut, line it up and loop it. So let us not forget that Dr. Funkenstein was way ahead of his time as well."

— Bootsy Collins

== In popular culture ==
"More Bounce to the Ounce" is featured in the films Boyz n the Hood, Mi Vida Loca, Losing Isaiah, Hate, Any Given Sunday, Blue Hill Avenue and Straight Outta Compton, the 2002 Rockstar video game Grand Theft Auto: Vice City, the 2015 New Girl season 4 episode "Par 5" and the 2018 South Park season 22 episode "A Boy and a Priest".

== Track listing ==
All songs written by Roger Troutman.

Side one:

1. "More Bounce to the Ounce" – 9:25
2. "Freedom" – 3:48
3. "Brand New Player" – 5:51

Side two:

1. "Funky Bounce" – 6:46
2. "Be Alright" – 7:52
3. "Coming Home" – 6:34

== Chart performance ==
In 1980, "More Bounce to the Ounce" went to number 2 on the US Billboard Black singles chart. Also in 1980, the album launched in the number one position on the US Black albums chart..

== Certifications ==
Region	Certification	Certified units/sales
United States (RIAA)	Gold	500,000^{^}
^{^} Shipments figures based on certification alone.

== Personnel ==
- vocals - Bobby Glover, Jannetta Boyce, Marchelle Smith, Delores Smith
- percussion - Larry Troutman, Lester Troutman
- conga drums - Larry Troutman
- trap drums - Lester Troutman
- bass, vocals - Terry Troutman
- sax - Carl Cowen
- keyboards, vocals - Greg Jackson
- guitars - Bootsy Collins
- guitars, vocals, keyboards, talk box, bass, harmonica, vibraphone - Roger Troutman
- album cover art - Ronald P. "Stozo" Edwards, Overton Loyd

== See also ==
- List of number-one R&B albums of 1980 (U.S.)
