= Zapp II =

Studio album by Zapp
- Released: March 8, 1982
- Genre: R&B; funk
- Length: 40:52
- Label: Warner Bros.
- Producer: Roger Troutman, Zapp Troutman

Zapp chronology
Zapp (1980)	Zapp II (1982)	Zapp III (1983)

Singles from Zapp II
- 1. "Doo Wa Ditty (Blow That Thing)" / "A Touch of Jazz (Playin' Kinda Ruff Part II)" Released: 1982; 2. "Dance Floor" Released: 1982; 3. "Playin' Kinda Ruff / Do You Really Want an Answer?" Released: July 14, 1982

Zapp II is the second studio album by American funk band Zapp, released on 1982 via Warner Bros. Records.

== Release ==
Zapp II peaked at No. 25 on the US Billboard 200 chart and at No. 2 on the US Billboard R&B chart. Three singles were released from the album, "Doo Wa Ditty (Blow That Thing)" / "A Touch of Jazz (Playin' Kinda Ruff Part II)", "Dance Floor" and "Playin' Kinda Ruff" / "Do You Really Want an Answer?". "Dance Floor" was the biggest R&B hit from the album, peaking at No. 1. The album was certified gold by the Recording Industry Association of America (RIAA) on September 21, 1982.

== Reception ==
Professional ratings
Review scores
Source	Rating
AllMusic	3/5 stars
Christgau's Record Guide	B+
The Philadelphia Inquirer	5/5 stars
Rolling Stone	3/5 stars

From contemporary reviews, Chip Stern of Rolling Stone, borrowed the styles of George Clinton, but that Zapp have "subsumed the "rap" to the dictates of the rhythm section – a twangy cubist mélange of rhyme, dance time and choruses of synthesized voices. No one's going to mistake this singing for that of the trendy syntho-pop bands" and declared it superior to their first album. Stern recommended the album "For those who find the Sixties section of their record collections more danceable than the superficial R&B; of today, Zapp is a smart, brash alternative." Ken Tucker of The Philadelphia Inquirer gave the album a five out of five star rating, noting that Roger Troutman has "managed to make his languid funk style sound devilshly sexy and urgent on [Zapp II]", declaring the album to be "the party record of the month". Robert Christgau gave a positive review writing in Christgau's Record Guide: The '80s (1990), "— unlike its predecessor it is a real dance LP--side one will function your ass off. And you'll want to play "Playin' Kinda Ruff" again." He did however feel the album lacked some way in content saying, "This idly functional, playfully mechanical six-cut dance LP tested my tolerance for innocent mindlessness, especially after I realized that my favorite tune appears on both sides."

== Track listing ==
All tracks are written by Roger and Larry Troutman

No.	Title	Length
1.	"Dance Floor"	11:09
2.	"Playin' Kinda Ruff"	6:48
3.	"Doo Wa Ditty (Blow That Thing)"	4:58
4.	"Do You Really Want an Answer?"	6:36
5.	"Come On"	5:11
6.	"A Touch of Jazz (Playin' Kinda Ruff Part II)"	6:10
Total length:		40:52

"Doo Wa Ditty" appears in its edited 7" form on CD reissues and streaming services.

== Charts ==
Chart (1982)	Peak position
US Billboard 200	25
US R&B Albums (Billboard)	2

== Certifications ==
Region	Certification	Certified units/sales
United States (RIAA)	Gold	500,000^{^}
^{^} Shipments figures based on certification alone.
