= Shirley Murdock =

American contemporary R&B singer

- Born: Shirley Murdock; May 22, 1957 (age 69); Toledo, Ohio, U.S.
- Genres: R&B; soul; jazz-funk; gospel; smooth soul
- Occupation: Singer-songwriter
- Instruments: Vocals; piano
- Years active: 1986–present
- Labels: Elektra Records; Dexterity Sounds/EMI Gospel; Tyscot Records

Shirley Murdock (born May 22, 1957) is an American R&B singer-songwriter. She is best known for her guest appearance alongside Charlie Wilson on Zapp and Roger's 1986 single "Computer Love", as well as her 1986 single, "As We Lay". The latter peaked at number 23 on the Billboard Hot 100 and spawned from her self-titled debut album (1986), released by Elektra Records.

== Early life ==
Murdock was born on May 22, 1957 in Toledo, Ohio. She attended and graduated from St. Ursula Academy.

== Career ==
Murdock started out singing gospel music in her native Toledo. Funk singer/musician Roger Troutman hired Murdock as a backing vocalist for his family's band Zapp, which had several hits on Warner Bros. (and its Reprise Records imprint). Based on this success, Troutman began recording tracks with Murdock and lead singer Sugarfoot of the Ohio Players, among others, at his Dayton-based recording studio, Troutman Sound Labs. Murdock and Troutman's first charted single was a Warner Bros. single issued as Roger (featuring Shirley Murdock), "Girl, Cut It Out", which charted at number 79 R&B in early 1985.

Murdock signed with Elektra Records and released "No More", written by Shirley Murdock and Gregory Jackson (Cincinnati, Ohio funk keyboardist and member of Zapp), which made it to number 24 R&B in early 1986. Then came her signature hit, "As We Lay", written by Zapp's Larry Troutman and keyboardist Billy Beck (of the Ohio Players). The tender, melancholy ballad made it to the R&B Top Ten in 1986 and peaked at number 23 pop and number 21 on the adult contemporary chart in early 1987. Her debut album was certified gold, also helped along by the follow-up hits "Go on Without You" and "Be Free." She also released albums in 1988 (A Woman's Point of View) and 1991 (Let There Be Love!). In early 2000, Murdock toured in the inspirational/gospel play Be Careful What You Pray For with Cuba Gooding, Sr. and David Peaston. Murdock appeared on T.D. Jakes' 1997 project Woman Thou Art Loosed, nominated for Grammy, as well as Jakes' 1999 release Sacred Love Songs.

In 2002, Murdock released Home, her debut gospel-music album, on T.D. Jakes' Dexterity Sounds record label, and peaked at No. 9 on Billboard's Top Gospel Albums chart on March 16, 2002. The album is produced by a list of music engineers, alongside Murdock's husband, Dale Degroat. AllMusic review singled out album's highlights, such as: "We Need a Word From the Lord" (giving a "powerful, message-driven" performance); "Never Let You Down" ( "beautiful song of encouragement"; and inspirational song "The Dream That Would Not Die".

She made her acting debut in the movie Sweating in the Spirit. Most recently, Murdock has signed with Tyscot Records and released her most recent album in March 2007.

In 2009, Murdock collaborated with Teena Marie on the song "Soldier", from Marie's album Congo Square. She also appeared in the 2009 stage play A Mother's Prayer, with Johnny Gill, Robin Givens, and Jermaine Crawford. She also appeared in "A Mother's Love" a stage play produced by Kandi Burruss and Todd Tucker in 2014.

== Discography ==
=== Studio albums ===
Year	Album details	Peak chart positions			Certifications
Year	Album details	US	US R&B	US Gos	Certifications
1986	Shirley Murdock!: First studio album; Release date: February 18, 1986; Label: Elektra	44	9	—	RIAA: Gold
1988	A Woman's Point of View: Second studio album; Release date: May 31, 1988; Label: Elektra	137	19	—	
1991	Let There Be Love!: Third studio album; Release date: June 17, 1991; Label: Elektra	—	22	—	
2002	Home: Fourth studio album; Release date: February 26, 2002; Label: Chordant/EMI	—	—	9	
2007	Soulfood: Fifth studio album; Release date: March 20, 2007; Label: Tyscot	—	71	7	
"—" denotes a recording that did not chart or was not released in that territory.

=== Live albums ===
Year	Album details	Peak
Year	Album details	US Gos
2011	Live: The Journey: First live album; Release date: October 18, 2011; Label: Tyscot	24

=== Compilation albums ===
Year	Album details
2001	The Very Best of Shirley Murdock: First compilation album; Released: May 15, 2001; Label: Elektra/Rhino/Atlantic

=== Singles ===
Year	Single	Peak chart positions						Album
Year	Single	US	US R&B	US A/C	US Dan	US Gos	UK	Album
1986	"No More"	—	24	—	27	—	—	Shirley Murdock!
1986	"Truth or Dare"	—	—	—	—	—	60	Shirley Murdock!
1986	"As We Lay"	23	5	21	—	—	—	Shirley Murdock!
1987	"Go on Without You"	—	5	—	—	—	—	Shirley Murdock!
1987	"Be Free"	—	86	—	—	—	—	Shirley Murdock!
1988	"Husband"	—	5	—	—	—	—	A Woman's Point of View
1988	"Oh What a Feeling"	—	—	—	—	—	—	A Woman's Point of View
1988	"Found My Way"	—	—	—	—	—	—	A Woman's Point of View
1991	"In Your Eyes"	—	7	—	—	—	—	Let There Be Love!
1991	"Stay with Me Tonight"	—	34	—	—	—	—	Let There Be Love!
1992	"Let There Be Love!"	—	89	—	47	—	—	Let There Be Love!
2007	"I Love Me Better Than That"	—	—	—	—	22	—	Soulfood
2011	"Dream"	—	—	—	—	22	—	Live: The Journey
"—" denotes a recording that did not chart or was not released in that territory.
