= Roger Troutman =

American musician (1951–1999)

- Troutman in 1981

Background information
- Also known as: Roger
- Born: Roger Troutman; November 29, 1951; Hamilton, Ohio, U.S.
- Died: April 25, 1999 (aged 47) Dayton, Ohio, U.S.
- Genre: Funk
- Occupations: Singer; musician; songwriter; record producer
- Instruments: Vocals; talk box; guitar; keyboards
- Years active: 1975–1999
- Labels: Warner Bros.; Reprise
- Formerly of: Zapp

Roger Troutman (November 29, 1951 – April 25, 1999), also known simply as Roger, was an American singer, musician, songwriter, and record producer. He was the founder of the band Zapp who helped spearhead the funk movement and influenced West Coast hip-hop due to the scene's heavy sampling of his music.

Troutman frequently used the talk box, a device that is connected to an instrument (frequently a keyboard, but most commonly a guitar) to create different vocal effects. Troutman used a custom-made talkbox—the Electro Harmonix "Golden Throat"—through a Moog Minimoog and later in his career a Yamaha DX100 FM synthesizer.

As both band leader of Zapp and in his subsequent solo releases, he scored a bevy of funk and R&B hits throughout the 1980s and regularly collaborated with hip-hop artists in the 1990s.

Roger was the older cousin of hip-hop and R&B musician André Troutman.

== Biography ==
=== Early career ===
Born in Hamilton, Ohio, Troutman was the fourth of nine children. A graduate of Central State University, his first band was called the Crusaders; however, they are not to be confused with the jazz group featuring Joe Sample and Wilton Felder. Troutman's band played in Cincinnati and recorded a single, "Busted Surfboard"/"Seminole". The band members were Rick Schoeny, Roy Beck, Dave Spitzmiller, and Denny Niebold. Troutman had formed various other bands with his four brothers, including "Lil" Roger and the Vels, and Roger and the Human Body. In 1977, he and the Human Body issued "Freedom", their first single.

Within two years, Troutman and his brothers were discovered by George Clinton, who signed the newly christened Zapp to his Uncle Jam Records label in 1979. The original line-up consisted of Troutman brothers Roger, Larry, Lester and Terry, along with Gregory Jackson and Bobby Glover. Zapp made their professional television debut on the first and only Funk Music Awards show.

A year later, as Uncle Jam Records was forced to close, Troutman signed with Bootsy Collins under Rubber Band Music to Warner Bros. Records and released his self-titled debut 'Zapp', which yielded "More Bounce to the Ounce", produced by Collins, co- produced, written, composed and performed by Troutman. The song peaked at number 2 on the Billboard Soul Singles chart in late 1980. The debut album reached the top 20 of the Billboard 200.

From 1980 to 1985, Zapp released the gold-selling albums Zapp, Zapp II, Zapp III and The New Zapp IV U, including the Top 10 R&B singles "Be Alright", "Dance Floor", "I Can Make You Dance", "Heartbreaker", "It Doesn't Really Matter" and "Computer Love". Throughout Zapp's history, around 15 musicians participated. In 1993, Zapp released their biggest-selling album: Zapp & Roger: All the Greatest Hits. It featured remixed cuts of Troutman's solo singles along with a new single "Slow and Easy", (featured vocalists Shirley Murdock and Ronnie Diamond). The album sold over two million copies. The album Zapp VI: Back by Popular Demand was released in 2002 by the remaining brothers after the deaths of Roger and Larry.

=== Solo career and production work on other artists ===
In 1981, Troutman cut The Many Facets of Roger, his first solo album. Featuring a funk cover of Marvin Gaye's "I Heard It Through the Grapevine", which went to number 1 on the R&B singles chart, the album sold over a million copies. The album also featured the hit "So Ruff, So Tuff". The same year, Troutman recorded with Parliament-Funkadelic on the band's final Warner Brothers' album The Electric Spanking of War Babies.

In 1984, Troutman issued his second solo album The Saga Continues..., which featured the singles "Girl Cut It Out", "It's in the Mix" (which was dedicated to Soul Train and its host Don Cornelius), and a cover of Wilson Pickett's "In the Midnight Hour", which featured gospel group the Mighty Clouds of Joy. In 1987, Troutman scored his most successful solo album with Unlimited!, carried by the hit "I Want to Be Your Man" which rose to number 3 on the Billboard Hot 100 and number 1 on the R&B chart.

Alongside his successful career as Zapp member and solo artist, Troutman also became a producer and writer for other artists including Shirley Murdock, whose 1985 Platinum debut featured the Troutman-produced hit "As We Lay". He also produced for Zapp member Dale DeGroat on his solo efforts. In 1988, Troutman made an appearance on Scritti Politti's third album Provision, providing talk box vocals on the songs "Boom! There She Was" and "Sugar and Spice".

Three years later, Troutman released his final solo album with Bridging the Gap, featuring the hit "Everybody (Get Up)". He worked with Elvis Costello on the song "The Other Side of Summer". In 1989, NBA Entertainment selected Troutman among a variety of candidates to record a tribute song called "I'm So Happy" for Kareem Abdul-Jabbar.

=== Career re-emergence ===
Troutman toured after the release of All the Greatest Hits. He was invited to appear as guest artist on several hip-hop albums, including Snoop Dogg's 1993 debut Doggystyle. In 1995, he was featured on Eazy-E's posthumous album Str8 off tha Streetz of Muthaphukkin Compton on "Eternal E". The same year Troutman featured alongside Dr. Dre on 2Pac's "California Love", which topped the Billboard Hot 100, sold over two million copies, and received a Grammy nomination for Best Rap Performance by a Duo or Group. Troutman then produced a top 10 R&B hit cover of the Persuaders' "Thin Line Between Love and Hate", performed by Shirley Murdock and R&B group H-Town, with talk box by Troutman. The movie soundtrack to A Thin Line Between Love and Hate also included a club hit "Chocolate City". In 1998, he appeared in a remix version of Sounds of Blackness' "Hold On (A Change Is Coming)", which sampled Zapp's "Doo-Wah Ditty (Blow That Thang)". Troutman recorded on the song "Master of the Game" from rapper Kool Keith's album Black Elvis/Lost In Space, released in August 1999. The last song Troutman recorded for was "Twisted" on Tech N9ne's album Anghellic, released two years after Troutman's death.

== Murder ==
On the morning of April 25, 1999, Troutman was found shot and critically wounded outside his northwest Dayton recording studio around 7:00 a.m. According to doctors, he was shot several times in the torso. He died during surgery at the Good Samaritan Hospital and Health Center. His brother Larry was found dead in a car a few blocks away with a single self-inflicted gunshot wound to the head. The car matched the description of a vehicle leaving the scene, according to witnesses. It is believed that Larry had fatally shot Roger, then himself.

== Accolades ==
=== Grammy Awards ===
The Grammy Awards are awarded annually by the National Academy of Recording Arts and Sciences. Troutman has received a sole Grammy nomination.

Year	Nominee / work	Award	Result
1996	"California Love"	Best Rap Performance by a Duo or Group	Nominated

== Discography ==
=== Studio albums ===
Title	Release	Peak chart positions	
Title	Release	US	US R&B
The Many Facets of Roger	Released: 1981; Label: Warner Bros.	26	1
The Saga Continues...	Released: 1984; Label: Warner Bros.	64	13
Unlimited!	Released: 1987; Label: Reprise	35	4
Bridging the Gap	Released: 1991; Label: Reprise	—	45

=== Singles ===
Title	Release	Peak chart positions					Album
Title	Release	US	US R&B	US Dance	US AC	UK	Album
"I Heard It Through the Grapevine"	1981	79	1	25	—	—	The Many Facets of Roger
"Do It Roger"	1982	—	24	—	—	—	The Many Facets of Roger
"In the Mix"	1984	—	10	—	—	—	The Saga Continues...
"In the Midnight Hour"	1984	—	34	—	—	—	The Saga Continues...
"Girl, Cut It Out"	1985	—	79	—	—	—	The Saga Continues...
"Papa's Got a Brand New Bag"	1987	—	54	—	—	—	Unlimited!
"I Want to Be Your Man"	1987	3	1	—	22	61	Unlimited!
"If You're Serious"	1987	—	32	—	—	—	Unlimited!
"Thrill Seekers"	1988	—	27	—	—	—	Unlimited!
"(Everybody) Get Up"	1991	—	19	—	—	—	Bridging the Gap
"You Should Be Mine"	1991	—	54	—	—	—	Bridging the Gap
"Take Me Back"	1992	—	37	—	—	—	Bridging the Gap

==== As featured artist ====
Title	Release	Peak chart positions		Certifications	Album
Title	Release	US	US R&B	Certifications	Album
"Boom! There She Was" (Scritti Politti featuring Roger Troutman)	1988	53	94		Provision
"Put Your Lovin' Through the Test" (Keith Sweat featuring Roger Troutman)	1994	—	—		Get Up on It
"California Love" (2Pac featuring Dr. Dre and Roger Troutman)	1995	1	1	BPI: 2× Platinum	All Eyez on Me
"It's Your Body" (Johnny Gill featuring Roger Troutman)	1996	43	19		Let's Get the Mood Right
"Sweet Sexy Thing" (Nu Flavor featuring Roger Troutman)	1997	62	93		Nu Flavor
"Down for Yours" (Nastyboy Klick featuring Roger Troutman)	1997	69	58		The First Chapter
"Raza Park" (Latino Velvet featuring Don Cisco, Frost and Roger Troutman)	1998	—	—		Latino Velvet Project
"All Night" (N2Deep featuring Roger Troutman)	1998	—	—		The Rumble
"Playaz Need No Love" (HBomb featuring Roger Troutman)	1998	—	—		Narcissism
"Master of the Game" (Kool Keith featuring Roger Troutman)	1999	—	—		Black Elvis/Lost in Space
"—" denotes releases that did not chart.

==== Soundtrack appearances ====
Title	Release	Other performer(s)	Album
"Express Yourself"	1993	Fu-Schnickens	Addams Family Values
"I Heard It Through the Grapevine"	1995		Friday
"Chocolate City"	1996	Shirley Murdock	A Thin Line Between Love and Hate
"A Thin Line Between Love and Hate"	1996	H-Town, Shirley Murdock	A Thin Line Between Love and Hate
"I Want to Be Your Man"	2000		Love & Basketball
"I Want to Be Your Man"	2001		Pootie Tang
"I Want to Be Your Man"	2009		Soul Kitchen

==== Guest appearances ====
Title	Release	Other performer(s)	Album
(several songs)	1988	Shirley Murdock	A Woman's Point of View
(several songs)	1989	Lynch	A Pinch of Lynch
"The Jones'"	1994	Ahmad	Ahmad
"We Want the Funk"	1994	Ahmad	Ahmad
"Scandalous"	1995	The Click	Game Related
"Eternal E"	1996	Eazy-E	Str8 off tha Streetz of Muthaphukkin Compton
"Untouchable"	1997	Scarface	The Untouchable
"Playaz Need No Love"	1998	H-Bomb	Narcissism
"4 My Homiez"	1998	Vontel	Vision of a Dream
"Keep It on the Real"	1998	Vontel	Vision of a Dream
"Don't Nobody"	1998	Vontel	Vision of a Dream
"Say Playa"	1998	Vontel	Vision of a Dream
"Throw It Up"	1999	Rappin' 4-Tay, Snoop Dogg, Tray Dee	Introduction to Mackin'
"Diamonds and Pearls"	1999	Frost, Cameosis	That Was Then, This Is Now Vol. 1
"Twisted"	2001	Tech N9ne	Anghellic
"Short Times"	2003	Da 5 Footaz	The Lost Scrolls
