= Zapp =

American band

- Zapp band with Roger Troutman (front, center)

Background information
- Origin: Dayton, Ohio, U.S.
- Genres: Funk; electro
- Years active: 1977–1999, 2003–present
- Labels: Warner Bros. (1980–2000); Zapp Town Records (2003–present)
- Members: Lester Troutman; Terry "Zapp" Troutman
- Past members: Roger Troutman; Larry Troutman; Thomas Troutman; Roger Troutman Jr.
- Website: www.thezappband.com

Zapp (also known as the Zapp Band, or more popularly Zapp & Roger) is an American funk band that emerged from Dayton, Ohio, United States, in 1977. Particularly influential in the electro subgenre of funk, Zapp were known for their trademark use of the talk-box effect. The original line-up consisted of four Troutman brothers—frontman Roger, Larry, Lester and Terry—first cousin, Sherman Fleetwood—and non-Troutman family members Bobby Glover, Gregory Jackson, Jerome Derrickson, Eddie Barber, Jannetta Boyce and Shirley Murdock. Zapp also worked closely with George Clinton and Bootsy Collins of Parliament-Funkadelic during its early stages, their support being a factor in the group gaining a record deal with Warner Bros. Records in 1979.

Zapp released its eponymous debut album in 1980, and achieved mainstream recognition with the single "More Bounce to the Ounce". The group's 1982 follow-up Zapp II sold well and was certified gold. In the 1990s, Zapp would also influence the G-funk sound and the broader cultural scene of West Coast hip-hop itself. The band disbanded in 1999 after Roger and Larry Troutman died in an apparent murder-suicide executed by Larry. Zapp reformed briefly in 2003 with the remaining brothers of the Troutman family to produce the album Zapp VI: Back By Popular Demand.

== Career ==
=== 1966–1980: Early career and major record deal ===
Born on November 29, 1951, in Hamilton, Ohio, Roger Troutman began recording music in the mid to late 1960s, issuing his first solo recording efforts "Jolly Roger" and "Night Time" on the obscure and now defunct Ohio label, Teen Records in 1966 under the band name 'Lil' Roger and His Fabulous Vels. Although neither song received recognition due to its very limited release, Troutman and brothers pursued their music career throughout the 1970s, forming Roger & The Human Body in 1976, on their privately owned label Troutman Bros. Records. Their own label allowed Troutman and the band to give a slightly wider and more high-profile release of their own music, issuing their first (and only) album Introducing Roger in 1976.

Roger and Zapp performing. Unknown date

In the late 1970s Roger Troutman continued to record with his brothers, losing the name Roger & The Human Body and adopting the Zapp nickname from his brother Terry in 1977. The group searching for recognition, began playing at various small venues locally around Ohio. The Troutman family had long-standing friendships with Ohio natives Phelps "Catfish" Collins and William Earl "Bootsy" Collins, who had both been involved with Parliament-Funkadelic in the early 1970s. Phelps and Bootsy were attendees at a performance, and were impressed with Zapp's musical abilities, prompting Bootsy to invite Roger to the United Sound Studios in Detroit (the P-Funk studio base) which was frequently used by Parliament-Funkadelic. Roger Troutman subsequently wrote and recorded the demo for "More Bounce to the Ounce" in 1978. George Clinton, the leader of Funkadelic liked the recording and encouraged Troutman to present the demo to Warner Bros. Records. Warner Bros. signed Zapp in early 1979, and on July 28, 1980, Zapp released their debut album, which was recorded by Roger and produced by Bootsy between 1979 and early 1980 at the United Sound Studios in Detroit, their first recording on a major label. The album's sound, which is highly influenced by Parliament-Funkadelic, contrasts largely with Zapp's later releases. "More Bounce to the Ounce" reached number two on the Billboard Hot R&B tracks for two weeks during the autumn of 1980. By November 18, 1980, Zapp had been certified gold by the RIAA.

"George Clinton just happened to step into the studio this night and he really liked this one part that we had already re-did on 'Funky Bounce'. He advised us to loop that section and put the other talk-box parts over it. At that time, this was considered a genius act, because you had to actually cut the tape and make the right cut, line it up and loop it. So let us not forget that Dr. Funkenstein was way ahead of his time as well."

— Bootsy Collins citing Clinton's influence toward creating the song 'More Bounce To The Ounce'

=== 1980–1981: Split with George Clinton, Uncle Jam and CBS ===
After the 1980 release of Zapp's debut album, tensions rose between Roger Troutman and George Clinton. Troutman's solo album The Many Facets of Roger was primarily funded by Clinton, through CBS, and was slated to be released on his own Uncle Jam Records label. By the early 1980s, Clinton and his musical projects were experiencing financial troubles due to his poor management skills and shifting tastes in music. Around the time that Troutman's debut was due to be released, Warner Bros. Records dropped Clinton from their label. Funkadelic's final recording with Warner Bros., on which Troutman had worked briefly, was The Electric Spanking of War Babies. Under pressure from the label, it was cut from a double album to a single disc. Warner Bros. did not promote the release, which emerged in early 1981 and made little impact.

Troutman could see the disarray surrounding Clinton and severed their partnership by accepting a higher offer for the demo recordings of his album from Warner Bros. With Clinton out of the picture, Troutman was left to exercise virtually full creative control over the band's subsequent work. When The Many Facets of Roger was finally released in August 1981 it was on the Warner Bros. label. In Clinton's biography George Clinton: For the Record, Troutman was quoted as off-handedly commenting, "... Heck gee-willickers, Warner Bros. offered me mo' money". Clinton's view, expressed in his response, was that "CBS paid for it, I paid for it. I don't like to go into it on the negative side, but it cost about 5 million [dollars], and a lot of people's jobs and what we consider as the empire falling". The financial loss from the rupture with Troutman is credited as one of the factors that derailed Clinton's musical career and sent Funkadelic into hiatus.

=== 1982–1989: Zapp II and later albums ===
Zapp released its second album, Zapp II, on March 8, 1982. Electronic production techniques featured prominently, including liberal use of the talk-box that became Troutman's signature. Despite the contrasting styles between the first and the second albums, Zapp II attained gold status by September 21, 1982. The album fared almost as well as Zapp's debut, peaking at number two on the Billboard R&B chart, and reaching 25 on The Billboard 200 Albums chart. The single "Dancefloor (Part I)" peaked at number one on the R&B singles chart of 1982.

Zapp spawned several more albums in close succession, retaining the slick electronic style that Zapp II had adopted, but with diminishing success. Zapp III was released in 1983, and managed to gain a gold certification, but peaked at only 39 on the Billboard 200 and nine on the R&B chart. Zapp III's poorer commercial performance became a sign that the band's popularity and impact were beginning to decline toward the mid-1980s, with post-disco music falling out of trend. By the release of The New Zapp IV U in October 1985, the downward trajectory was evident. The album did not attain gold status until 1994, almost a decade after its initial release. Zapp's presence faded further in the latter half of the 1980s, as Troutman focused his attention on his solo career. The final release by Zapp before Troutman's death was Zapp V in September 1989, which achieved only moderate commercial success and failed to receive an RIAA certification.

=== 1990–1997: Later career ===
The increasingly dominant West Coast hip-hop scene of the early- to mid-1990s briefly brought Zapp and Roger back into the spotlight as their material became a source of samples for hip-hop tracks. Troutman gained recognition for providing talk-box backing vocals for both the original and remixed version of Tupac Shakur's 1995 comeback single "California Love"; the alternate version of the music video features Troutman playing the keyboard and talk-box during a party. Roger's involvement in "California Love" awarded him a Grammy nomination for "Best Rap Performance by a Duo or Group" in 1997.

=== 1998–present: Deaths of Roger and Larry Troutman, disbandment, and current activity ===
On Sunday morning, April 25, 1999, Roger Troutman was fatally shot several times in the torso by his older brother, Larry, as he exited a recording studio in Dayton, Ohio; he was taken to Good Samaritan Hospital, but died shortly after of his wounds. Larry's body was found in a car a short distance away from the murder scene. There were no witnesses at the time, and Larry's motive for orchestrating the apparent murder-suicide of Roger and himself remains unclear. Larry had been experiencing increasingly severe financial problems managing the family-run housing company, Troutman Enterprises, which eventually filed for chapter 11 bankruptcy owing $400,000 in tax.

During Roger's funeral, his nephew Clet Troutman performed a talk-box rendition of "Amazing Grace". Roger was survived by his six sons and five daughters; his eldest son, Roger Lynch Troutman Jr., died of head injuries just a few years after the murder of his father (January 31, 1970 – January 22, 2003).

After Troutman's death, Ice Cube said that "More Bounce To The Ounce" introduced him to hip-hop. "I was in the sixth grade, we'd stayed after school. We had this dude named Mr. Lock, and he used to bring in his radio with these pop-lockers. He used to teach [the dance group] the L.A. Lockers, and he would do community service in after-school programs. He knew a lot of kids and introduced them to all the new dances, he put on that song 'More Bounce', and they started pop-locking. And I think from that visual, from seeing that, it was my first introduction into hip-hop. Period. I didn't know nothing about nothing. I hadn't heard 'Rapper's Delight' yet. It was the first thing that was really fly to me. They started dancing, and since 'More Bounce' goes on forever, they just got down. I just think that was a rush of adrenaline for me, like a chemical reaction in my brain."

The resulting impact of Roger and Larry's deaths left the band stranded, halting production. Without Roger serving as the creative source, they effectively disbanded, and quietly left the music industry altogether. Warner Bros. Records eventually dropped the band from their label, bringing the professional recording career of Zapp to a close. A few years later, Zapp resurfaced for a short period after the establishment of its own independent label, Zapp Town Records, managed by the Troutman family. The label released its only album, Zapp VI: Back by Popular Demand, in 2003. Zapp returned to performing only in live concert, touring across the U.S. at various venues.

== Personnel ==
=== Original lineup ===
- Roger Troutman – lead and background vocals, guitar, bass, keyboards, harmonica, vibraphone, percussion, talk box
- Larry Troutman – percussion
- Lester Troutman – drums
- Terry "Zapp" Troutman – bass, keyboards, background vocals
- Gregory Jackson – keyboards, lead and background vocals
- Bobby Glover – lead and background vocals

=== Other members ===
- Eddie Barber – original member
- Jannetta Boyce – original member
- Jerome Derrickson – original member
- Sherman Fleetwood – original member
- Michael Warren – original member
- Shirley Murdock
- Ray Davis
- Michael "Slyde" Jennings
- Robert Jones
- Dale DeGroat
- Aaron Blackmon (1984–1990)
- Nicole Cottom
- Bart Thomas
- Ricardo Bray (died 2026)
- Bigg Robb (from the early/mid 1990s – 2009)
- Rhonda Stevens
- Roger Troutman Jr. (died of head injury in 2003)
- Thomas Troutman
- Rufus Troutman III
- Davis Brown – sound man
- Wanda Rash – vocalist (died 2014)
- Toika Troutman – vocalist
- Marchelle Smith – vocalist
- Eba Marie Porter (daughter of original band member Bobby Glover) – vocalist
- Damien Black – drummer
- Larry "Moogstar" Clemons
- James Cameron – saxophone (died 2017)
- Arsdale Harris III – keyboardist (1988–1992)

== Discography ==
=== Studio albums ===
- Zapp (1980)
- Zapp II (1982)
- Zapp III (1983)
- The New Zapp IV U (1985)
- Zapp Vibe (1989)
- Zapp VI: Back by Popular Demand (2003)
- Zapp VII: Roger & Friends (2018)
